= C30H54 =

The molecular formula C_{30}H_{54} may refer to:

- Baccharane
- Cucurbitane
- Dammarane
- Dinosterane
- Euphane
- 24-Isopropylcholestane
- Lanostane
- 24-n-Propylcholestane
- Protostane
- Tirucallane
