= C29H52 =

The molecular formula C_{29}H_{52} (molar mass: 400.72 g/mol) may refer to:

- Fusidane (29-nor protostane)
- Poriferastane (24S-ethylcholestane)
- Stigmastane (24R-ethylcholestane)
