= Dinosterane =

- Skeletal formula of dinosterane

Names
- IUPAC name 4α,23,24-Trimethylcholestane; (4R,5S,8S,9S,10S,13R,14S,17R)-4,10,13-trimethyl-17-[(2R,4S,5S)-4,5,6-trimethylheptan-2-yl]-2,3,4,5,6,7,8,9,11,12,14,15,16,17-tetradecahydro-1H-cyclopenta[a]phenanthrene

Identifiers
CAS Number	(20r 23s 24s): 146276-36-0; (20r 23s 24r): 146276-34-8; (20r 23r 24s): 146276-33-7; (20r 23r 24r): 146276-37-1
3D model (JSmol)	Interactive image
ChemSpider	(20r 23r 24s): 9308580
PubChem CID	(20r 23s 24s): 21625803; (20r 23s 24r): 11133461; (20r 23r 24s): 21625804; (20r 23r 24r): 21625805
- InChI: InChI=1S/C30H54/c1-19(2)23(6)21(4)18-22(5)26-13-14-27-24-11-12-25-20(3)10-9-16-29(25,7)28(24)15-17-30(26,27)8/h19-28H,9-18H2,1-8H3/t20-,21+,22-,23+,24+,25+,26-,27+,28+,29+,30-/m1/s1 Key: YISIWADHCLSOOJ-SKWDGVSXSA-N
- SMILES: CC1CCCC2(C1CCC3C2CCC4(C3CCC4C(C)CC(C)C(C)C(C)C)C)C

Properties
Chemical formula	C_{30}H_{54}
Molar mass	414.762 g·mol^{−1}

Related compounds
Related Compounds	Cholestane
- Except where otherwise noted, data are given for materials in their standard state (at 25 °C [77 °F], 100 kPa). Infobox references

Dinosterane is a steroidal alkane, also known as 4α,23,24-trimethylcholestane. It is used in geochemistry as a biomarker, interpreted as an indication of dinoflagellate presence due to its derivative dinosterol high occurrence in extant dinoflagellate species and its rarity in other taxa, although it has been shown to be produced by a single species of marine diatom as well.

== History of use as a biomarker ==
A 1984 study was conducted which established the dinoflagellate origin for dinosterane based on distributions of modern dinoflagellates and dinosterane abundance in sediment.

In 1993, dinosteranes were discovered in a section of the Bristol Trough that was dated to the Rhaetian Age. Due to the co-deposition of these dinosteranes with dinoflagellate cysts and comparison of microfossil abundance with hydrocarbon abundance, the dinosterane was associated with marine dinoflagellates. This was the first stratigraphic evidence for Mesozoic dinoflagellates.

In 1998, dinosteranes were found in high relative abundance in samples from the Lükati Formation, which were collected from the Kopli quarry in Estonia. This evidence was used to place the origin of dinoflagellates as early as the Early Cambrian, much earlier than the Bristol Trough studies had been able to.

== Characterisation ==
Dinosterane's mass spectrum shows a highly increased abundance of the m/z = 98 ion compared to 24-ethyl-4α-methylcholestane, which is likely due to preferential cleavage of the C-22,23 bond.
