= C30H52O =

The molecular formula C_{30}H_{52}O (molar mass: 428.73 g/mol) may refer to:

- Ambrein
- Dinosterol
- Diplopterol
- Friedelanol (3α-Friedelanol)
- Epifriedelanol (3β-Friedelanol)
- Tetrahymanol
- 24,25-dihydrolanosterol
