= C28H50 =

The molecular formula C_{28}H_{50} (molar mass: 386.69 g/mol, exact mass: 386.3913 u) may refer to:

- Campestane (24R-methylcholestane)
- Ergostane (24S-methylcholestane)
