= Poriferastane =

Names
- IUPAC name 5ξ-Poriferastane
- Systematic IUPAC name (1R,3aS,3bR,5aΞ,9aS,9bS,11aR)-1-[(2R,5S)-5-Ethyl-6-methylheptan-2-yl]-9a,11a-dimethylhexadecahydro-1H-cyclopenta[a]phenanthrene

Identifiers
CAS Number	22888-37-5
3D model (JSmol)	Interactive image
ChEBI	CHEBI:26211
ChemSpider	5256864
PubChem CID	6857528
UNII	9TH7LZJ9EG
- InChI: InChI=1S/C29H52/c1-7-22(20(2)3)12-11-21(4)25-15-16-26-24-14-13-23-10-8-9-18-28(23,5)27(24)17-19-29(25,26)6/h20-27H,7-19H2,1-6H3/t21-,22+,23?,24+,25-,26+,27+,28+,29-/m1/s1 Key: GKBHKNPLNHLYHT-UNOJTMJMSA-N
- SMILES: CC[C@@H](CC[C@@H](C)[C@H]1CC[C@@H]2[C@@]1(CC[C@H]3[C@H]2CCC4[C@@]3(CCCC4)C)C)C(C)C

Properties
Chemical formula	C_{29}H_{52}
Molar mass	400.735 g·mol^{−1}
- Except where otherwise noted, data are given for materials in their standard state (at 25 °C [77 °F], 100 kPa). Infobox references

Poriferastane or 24S-ethylcholestane is a tetracyclic triterpene and the parent structure of a series of steroids, such as poriferastanol.

== See also ==
- Stigmastane (24R-ethylcholestane)
- Campestane (24R-methylcholestane)
- Ergostane (24S-methylcholestane)
