= Aspergillus udagawae =

Scientific classification
- Kingdom: Fungi
- Division: Ascomycota
- Class: Eurotiomycetes
- Order: Eurotiales
- Family: Aspergillaceae
- Genus: Aspergillus
- Species: A. udagawae

Binomial name
- Aspergillus udagawae Y. Horie, Miyaji & Nishimura (1995)

Species of fungus

Aspergillus udagawae is a species of fungus in the genus Aspergillus. It is from the Fumigati section. Several fungi from this section produce heat-resistant ascospores, and the isolates from this section are frequently obtained from locations where natural fires have previously occurred. The species was first described in 1995. It has been reported to produce fumagillin, fumigaclavine A and C, fumigatins, fumiquinazolin F or G, helvolic acid, monomethylsulochrin, pyripyropene A, E, trypacidin, tryptoquivalines, and tryptoquivalones.

== Growth and morphology ==
A. udagawae has been cultivated on both Czapek yeast extract agar (CYA) plates and Malt Extract Agar Oxoid® (MEAOX) plates. The growth morphology of the colonies can be seen in the pictures below.

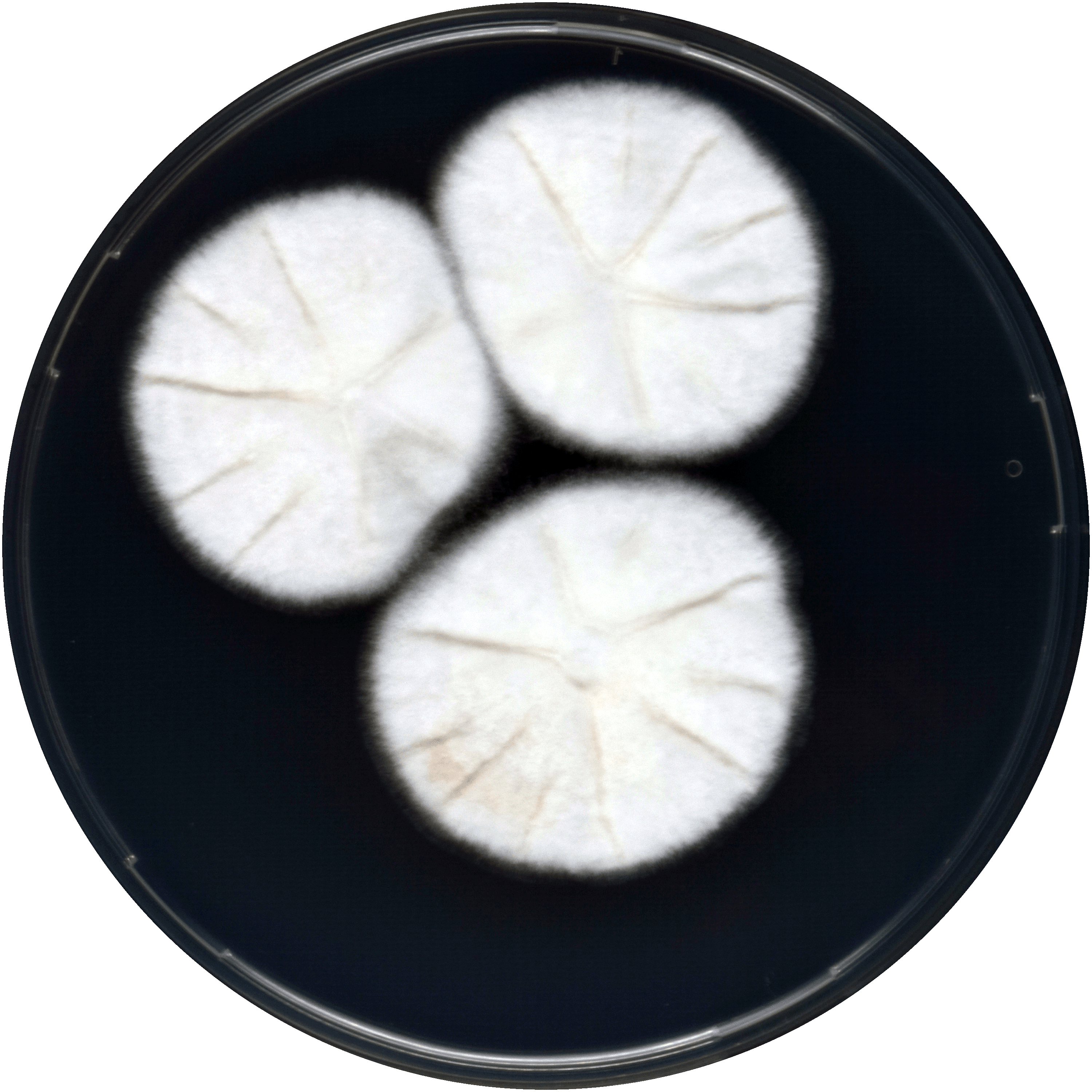
Aspergillus udagawae growing on CYA plate

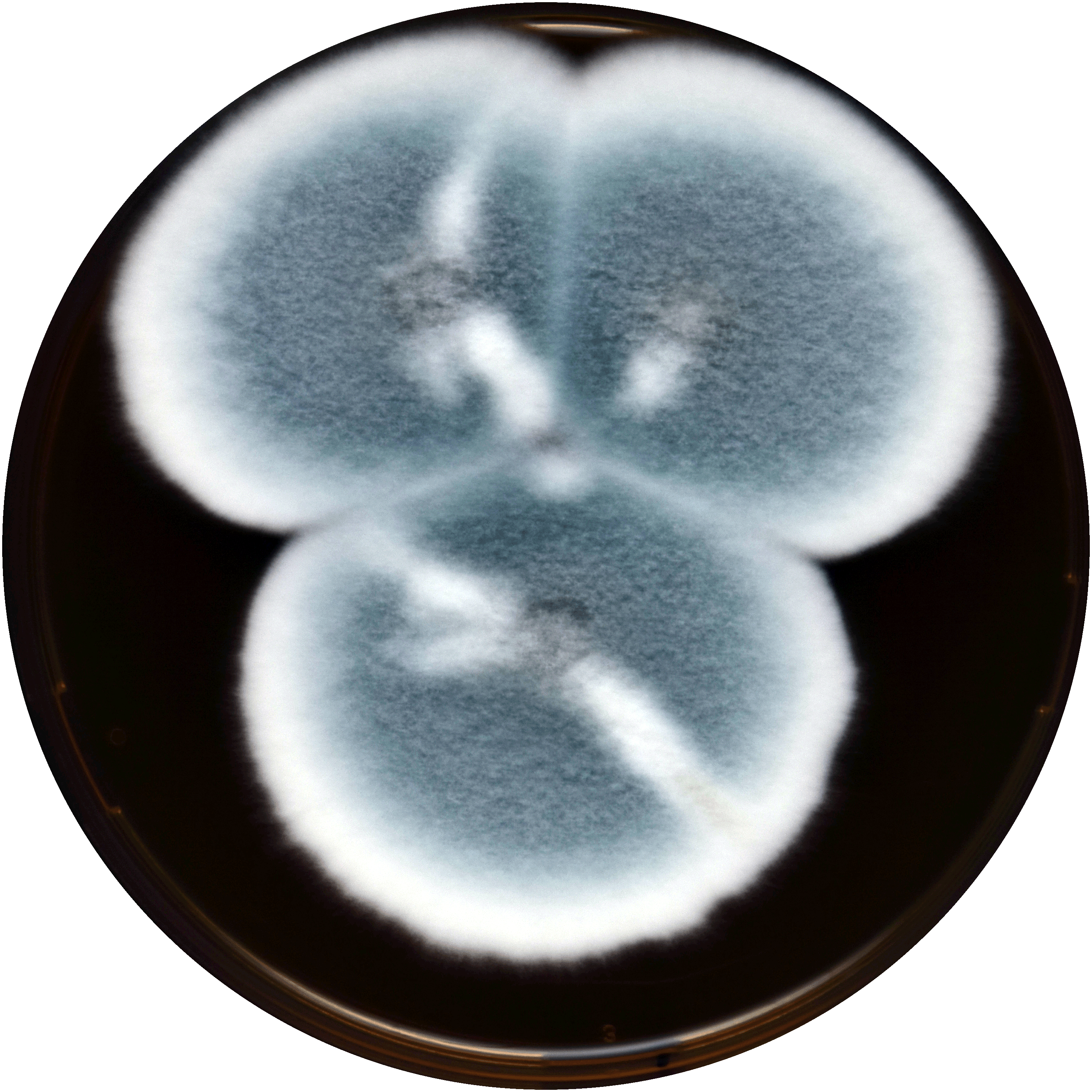
Aspergillus udagawae growing on MEAOX plate
