= Cholanic acid =

Names
- IUPAC name (4R)-4-[(8R,9S,10S,13R,14S,17R)-10,13-dimethyl-2,3,4,5,6,7,8,9,11,12,14,15,16,17-tetradecahydro-1H-cyclopenta[a]phenanthren-17-yl]pentanoic acid
- Other names Cholan-24-oic acid; Ursocholanic acid

Identifiers
CAS Number	25312-65-6
3D model (JSmol)	Interactive image
ChEBI	CHEBI:36237
ChemSpider	7827720
ECHA InfoCard	100.042.546
EC Number	246-816-2
PubChem CID	9548797
UNII	NS0L7RS7DA
CompTox Dashboard (EPA)	DTXSID70871345
- InChI: InChI=nChI=1S/C24H40O2/c1-16(7-12-22(25)26)19-10-11-20-18-9-8-17-6-4-5-14-23(17,2)21(18)13-15-24(19,20)3/h16-21H,4-15H2,1-3H3,(H,25,26)/t16-,17?,18+,19-,20+,21+,23+,24-/m1/s1 InChIKey = RPKLZQLYODPWTM-KBMWBBLPSA-N
- SMILES: C[C@@]12[C@]([C@]3([C@](CC1)([C@]4(C)C(CC3)(CCCC4)[H])[H])[H])(CC[C@@]2([C@@H](CCC(O)=O)C)[H])[H]

Properties
Chemical formula	C_{24}H_{40}O_{2}
Molar mass	360.582 g·mol^{−1}
- Except where otherwise noted, data are given for materials in their standard state (at 25 °C [77 °F], 100 kPa). Infobox references

Cholanic acid is a carboxylic acid derivative of the cholane class of steroids. It is a component of bile.
