= Aspergillus igneus =

Scientific classification
- Kingdom: Fungi
- Division: Ascomycota
- Class: Eurotiomycetes
- Order: Eurotiales
- Family: Aspergillaceae
- Genus: Aspergillus
- Species: A. igneus

Binomial name
- Aspergillus igneus Kozakiewicz (1989)

Synonyms
- Neosartorya aurata

Species of fungus

Aspergillus igneus (also known as Neosartorya aurata) is a species of fungus in the genus Aspergillus. It is from the Fumigati section. The species was first described in 1989. It has been reported to produce helvolic acid.

== Growth and morphology ==
A. igneus has been cultivated on both Czapek yeast extract agar (CYA) plates and Malt Extract Agar Oxoid® (MEAOX) plates. The growth morphology of the colonies can be seen in the pictures below.

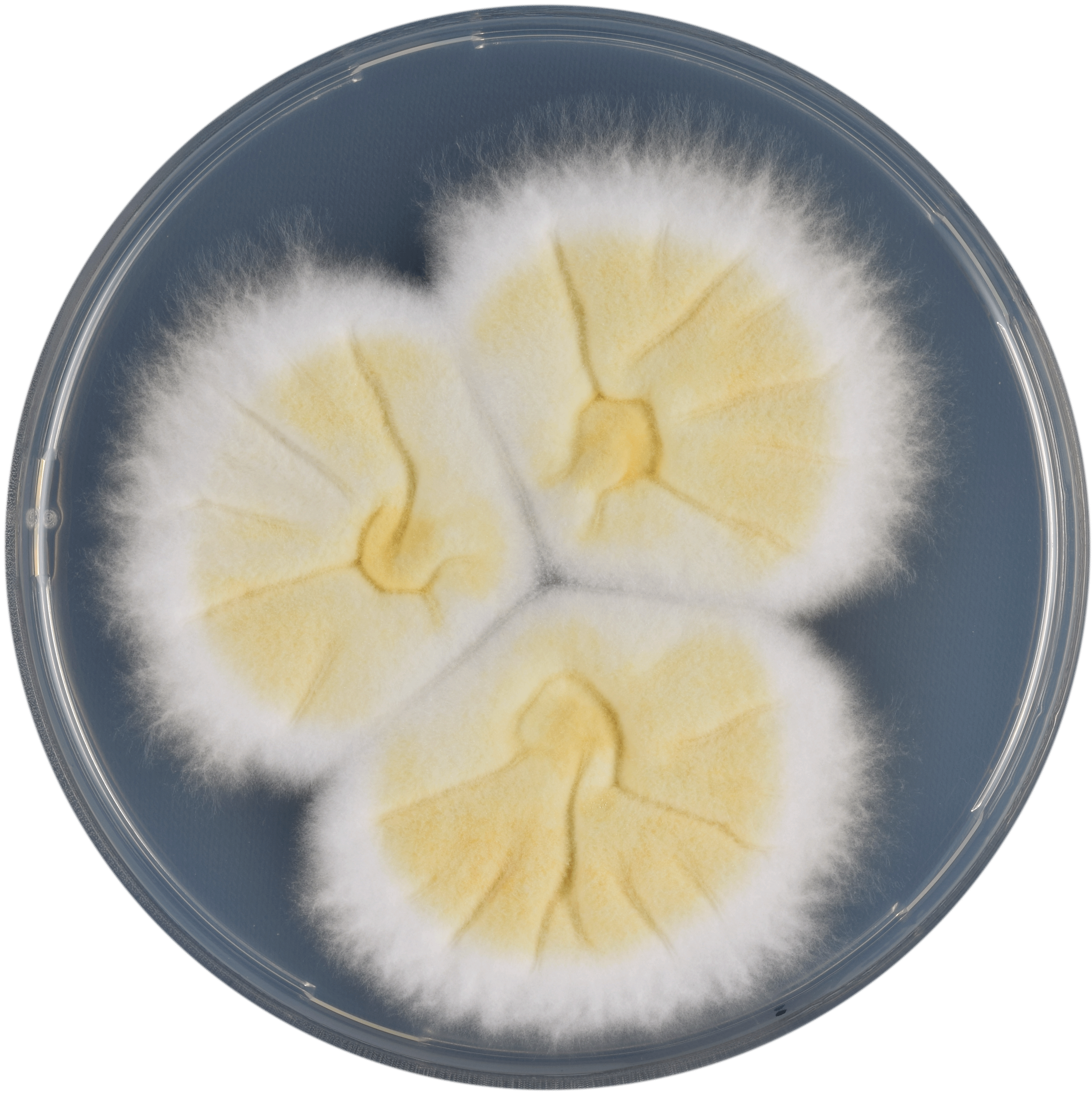
Aspergillus igneus growing on CYA plate

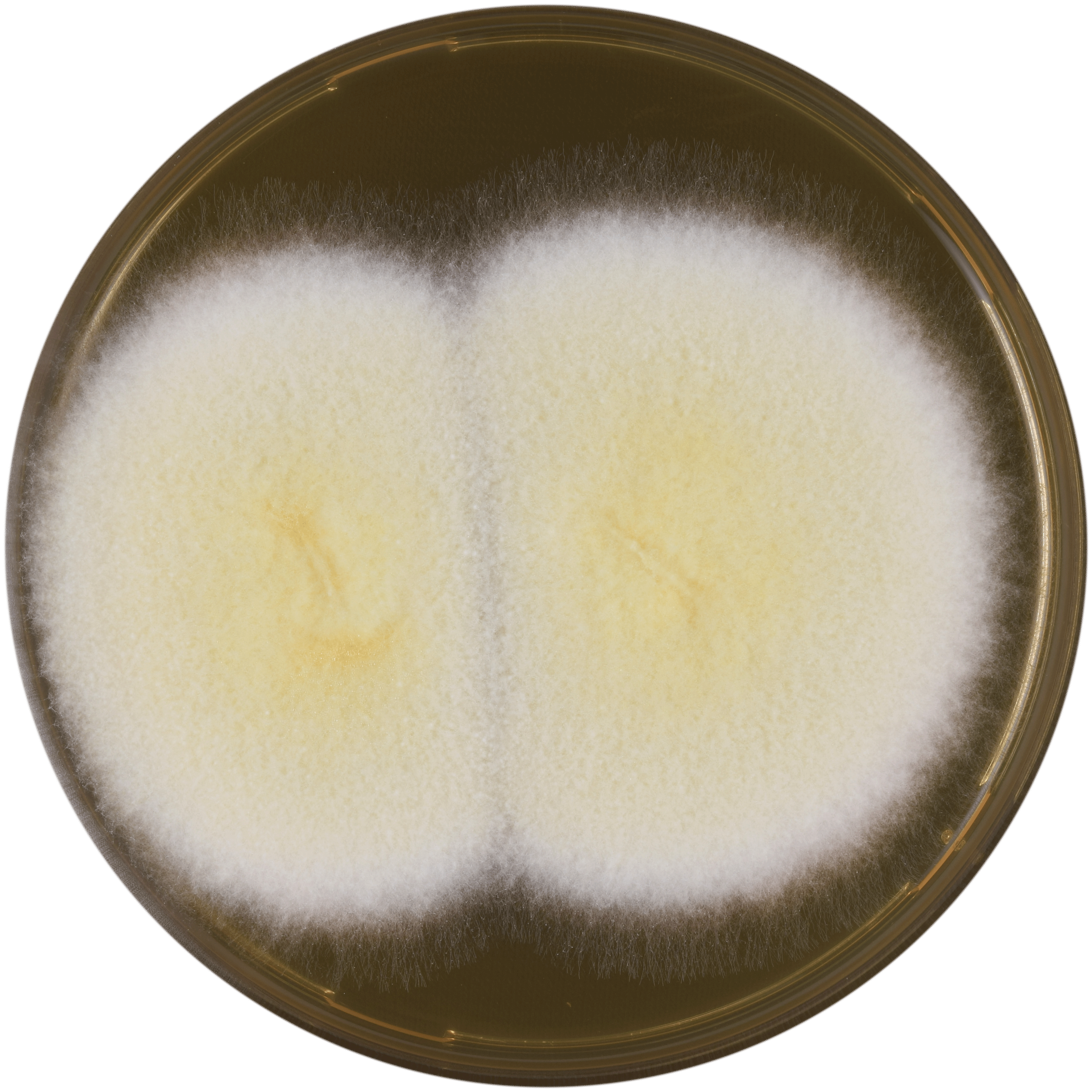
Aspergillus igneus growing on MEAOX plate
