= Aspergillus multiplicatus =

Scientific classification
- Kingdom: Fungi
- Division: Ascomycota
- Class: Eurotiomycetes
- Order: Eurotiales
- Family: Aspergillaceae
- Genus: Aspergillus
- Species: A. multiplicatus

Binomial name
- Aspergillus multiplicatus Yaguchi, Someya & Udagawa (1994)

Species of fungus

Aspergillus multiplicatus is a species of fungus in the genus Aspergillus. It is from the Fumigati section. Several fungi from this section produce heat-resistant ascospores, and the isolates from this section are frequently obtained from locations where natural fires have previously occurred. The species was first described in 1994. It has been reported to produce aszonapyrone A and helvolic acid.

== Growth and morphology ==
A. multiplicatus has been cultivated on both Czapek yeast extract agar (CYA) plates and Malt Extract Agar Oxoid® (MEAOX) plates. The growth morphology of the colonies can be seen in the pictures below.

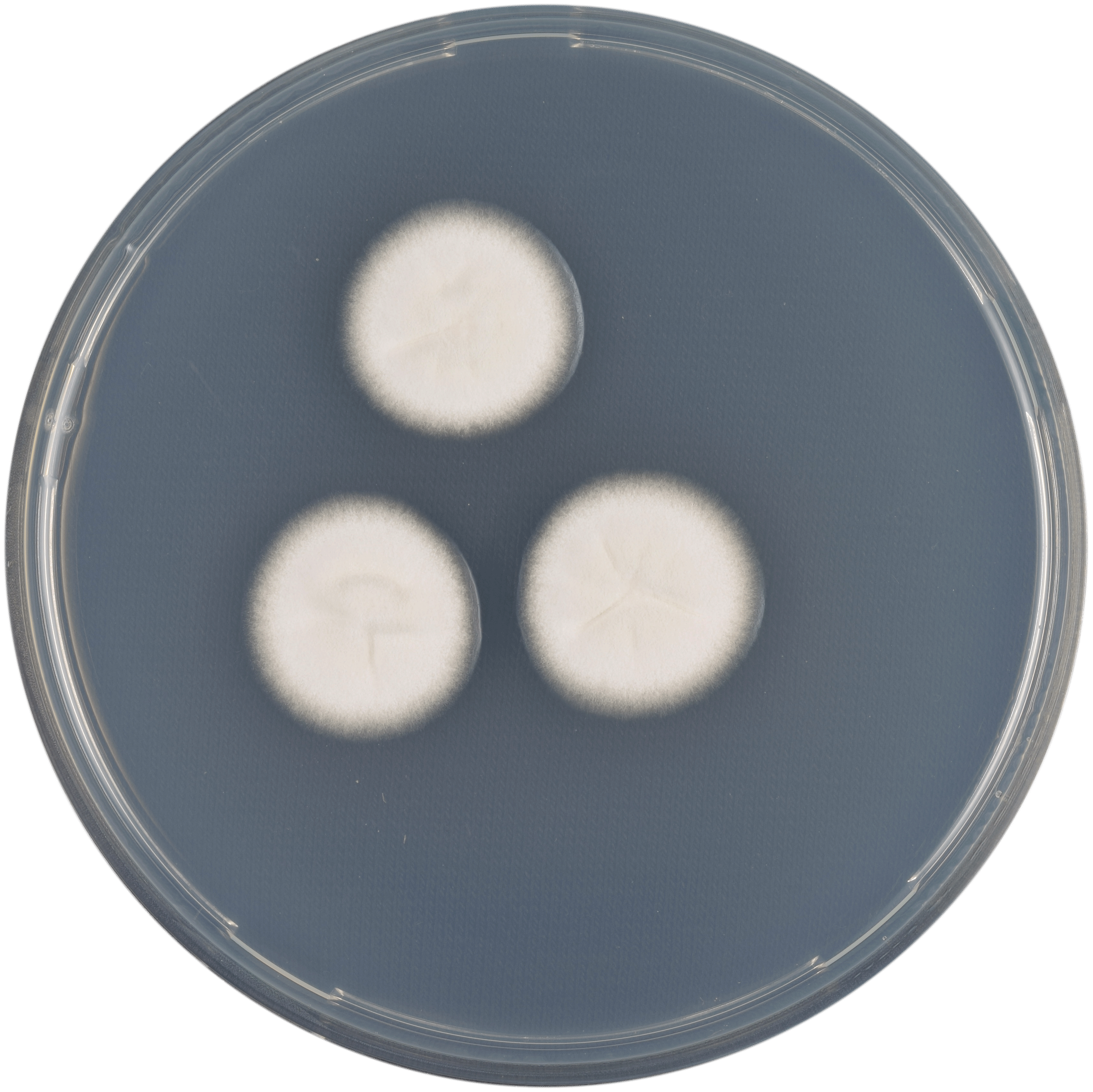
Aspergillus multiplicatus growing on CYA plate

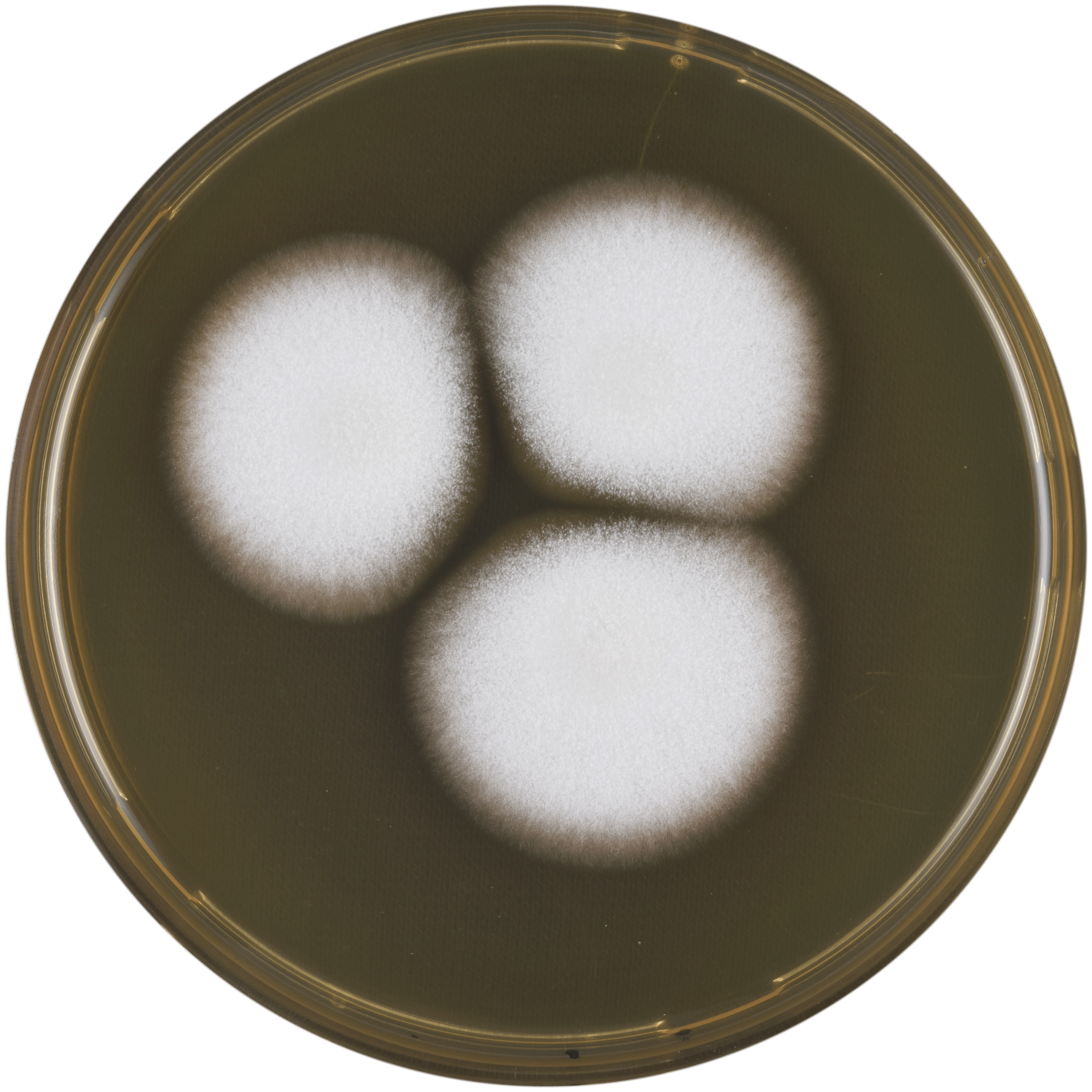
Aspergillus multiplicatus growing on MEAOX plate
