= Cephalosporin P1 =

Names
- IUPAC name (2Z)-2-[(3R,4S,5S,6R,7R,8S,9S,10R,13R,14S,16S)-6,16-diacetyloxy-3,7-dihydroxy-4,8,10,14-tetramethyl-2,3,4,5,6,7,9,11,12,13,15,16-dodecahydro-1H-cyclopenta[a]phenanthren-17-ylidene]-6-methylhept-5-enoic acid
- Other names Acremonic acid

Identifiers
CAS Number	13258-72-5
3D model (JSmol)	Interactive image
ChEMBL	ChEMBL3401949
PubChem CID	3037114
UNII	2U8E6JLQ1J
CompTox Dashboard (EPA)	DTXSID601316644
- InChI: InChI=1S/C33H50O8/c1-17(2)10-9-11-21(30(38)39)26-22-12-13-25-31(6)15-14-23(36)18(3)27(31)28(41-20(5)35)29(37)33(25,8)32(22,7)16-24(26)40-19(4)34/h10,18,22-25,27-29,36-37H,9,11-16H2,1-8H3,(H,38,39)/b26-21-/t18-,22+,23-,24+,25+,27-,28-,29+,31-,32+,33-/m1/s1 Key: YJJWILCYIMMPAS-VALXSNPUSA-N
- SMILES: C[C@@H]1[C@@H](CC[C@]2([C@H]1[C@H]([C@@H]([C@]3([C@H]2CC[C@@H]\4[C@@]3(C[C@@H](/C4=C(/CCC=C(C)C)\C(=O)O)OC(=O)C)C)C)O)OC(=O)C)C)O

Properties
Chemical formula	C_{33}H_{50}O_{8}
Molar mass	574.755 g·mol^{−1}
Density	g/cm³
Solubility in water	poorly soluble
- Except where otherwise noted, data are given for materials in their standard state (at 25 °C [77 °F], 100 kPa). (what is ?) Infobox references

Cephalosporin P1 is a naturally occurring antibiotic compound belonging to the cephalosporin class, which was first isolated from the fungus Cephalosporium acremonium (later reclassified as Acremonium chrysogenum). It is one of the early cephalosporins discovered, alongside cephalosporin C and other related metabolites.

Fusidane-type antibiotics are a class of triterpenoid antibiotics that include helvolic acid, fusidic acid, and cephalosporin P_{1}. Among these, fusidic acid is notable for its clinical use in treating bacterial infections.

== Uses ==
Unlike later-generation cephalosporins used clinically, cephalosporin P_{1} has limited therapeutic use due to its weaker antibacterial activity.

Cephalosporin P_{1} demonstrated strong effectiveness against methicillin-sensitive Staphylococcus aureus, methicillin-resistant S. aureus, and vancomycin-intermediate S. aureus strains.
