= 24-n-Propylcholestane =

Names
- IUPAC name (24Ξ)-24a^{2}-Homo-5ξ-stigmastane
- Systematic IUPAC name (1R,3aS,3bR,5aΞ,9aS,9bS,11aR)-9a,11a-Dimethyl-1-[(2R,5Ξ)-5-(propan-2-yl)octan-2-yl]hexadecahydro-1H-cyclopenta[a]phenanthrene

Identifiers
CAS Number	125224-28-4
3D model (JSmol)	Interactive image
ChemSpider	67494965
PubChem CID	53937960
CompTox Dashboard (EPA)	DTXSID901315540
- InChI: InChI=1S/C30H54/c1-7-10-23(21(2)3)13-12-22(4)26-16-17-27-25-15-14-24-11-8-9-19-29(24,5)28(25)18-20-30(26,27)6/h21-28H,7-20H2,1-6H3/t22-,23?,24?,25+,26-,27+,28+,29+,30-/m1/s1 Key: IVTLFEDUWFUUTN-WHCWVIOUSA-N
- SMILES: CCCC(CC[C@@H](C)[C@H]1CC[C@@H]2[C@@]1(CC[C@H]3[C@H]2CCC4[C@@]3(CCCC4)C)C)C(C)C

Properties
Chemical formula	C_{30}H_{54}
Molar mass	414.762 g·mol^{−1}
- Except where otherwise noted, data are given for materials in their standard state (at 25 °C [77 °F], 100 kPa). Infobox references

24-n-Propylcholestane is a sterane biomarker molecule often found in marine source rocks. It is a C_{30} molecule, meaning that it is composed of thirty carbon atoms, and is one of the leading ways to distinguish a marine source rock from a terrigenous sample. It is composed of three six-carbon rings and one five-carbon ring, with two methyl groups and one eleven carbon side chain. 24-n-Propylcholestane has a molar mass of 414.76 g/mol.

24-n-Propylcholestane is a sterane, which are derived from sterols after being buried in the sediment. Sterols turn into steranes by saturating the sterol's double bond and removing the alcohol group. Steranes are fairly stable, and are often found in source rocks and crude oils.

24-n-Propylcholesterol

24-n-Propylcholestane is derived from 24-n-propylcholesterol, which is made in the modern ocean by Chrysophyte algae. Because of its known modern creator, it is thought that traces of 24-n-propylcholestane in ancient sediments were likely produced by older algaes of the same order Chrysophyte. The marine algae is consumed by marine invertebrates, and so 24-n-propylcholesterols are also found in invertebrates, despite not being produced by them. Regardless of which organism is observed containing 24-n-propylcholesterols, the molecule originated from Chrysophyte algae.

The ratio of 24-n-propylcholestanes to 24-iso-propylcholestanes is used as an indicator for the presence of sponges.

== Detection ==
In sediments, sterane biomarkers are found as a mixture of stereoisomers. It can be difficult to separate out a specific stereoisomer, as is necessary for the detection of solely 24-n-propylcholestane. Because of this, 24-n-propylcholestane can be fairly difficult to detect using gas chromatography-mass spectrum (GC-MS). It has a m/z of 414 and a secondary peak at 217, and can be easily confused for a different group of C_{30} molecules, 4ɑ-methylsteranes.
