= Cholane =

Names
- IUPAC name Cholane
- Systematic IUPAC name (1R,3aS,3bR,5aΞ,9aS,9bS,11aR)-9a,11a-Dimethyl-1-[(2R)-pentan-2-yl]hexadecahydro-1H-cyclopenta[a]phenanthrene

Identifiers
| CAS Number | 80373-86-0 |
| 3D model (JSmol) | Interactive image; Interactive image |
| ChEBI | CHEBI:35519 |
| ChemSpider | 5256866 |
| PubChem CID | 6857530 |
| UNII | 6EF0441D4P |
| CompTox Dashboard (EPA) | DTXSID00203291 |
- InChI: InChI=1S/C24H42/c1-5-8-17(2)20-12-13-21-19-11-10-18-9-6-7-15-23(18,3)22(19)14-16-24(20,21)4/h17-22H,5-16H2,1-4H3/t17-,18?,19+,20-,21+,22+,23+,24-/m1/s1 Key: QSHQKIURKJITMZ-BRPMRXRMSA-N; InChI=1/C24H42/c1-5-8-17(2)20-12-13-21-19-11-10-18-9-6-7-15-23(18,3)22(19)14-16-24(20,21)4/h17-22H,5-16H2,1-4H3/t17-,18?,19+,20-,21+,22+,23+,24-/m1/s1 Key: QSHQKIURKJITMZ-BRPMRXRMBN
- SMILES: CCC[C@@H](C)[C@H]1CC[C@@H]2[C@@]1(CC[C@H]3[C@H]2CC[C@H]4[C@@]3(CCCC4)C)C; C41CCCC[C@@]1([C@@H]3[C@H]([C@@H]2CC[C@@H]([C@@]2(C)CC3)[C@H](C)CCC)CC4)C

Properties
| Chemical formula | C_{24}H_{42} |
| Molar mass | 330.59 g/mol |
- Except where otherwise noted, data are given for materials in their standard state (at 25 °C [77 °F], 100 kPa). verify (what is ?) Infobox references

Cholane is a triterpene which can exist as either of two stereoisomers, 5α-cholane and 5β-cholane. Its name is derived from Greek: χολή (chole) meaning 'bile' in reference to its original discovery from the bile of the American bullfrog (Rana catesbeiana). The compound itself has no known uses. However, various functionalized analogues are produced by plants and animals, typically in the form of sterols, steroids and bile acids (e.g. cholic acid).

5α-Cholane

5β-Cholane

== See also ==
- Cholestane
- Ergostane
