= Ergostane =

Names
- IUPAC name Ergostane
- Systematic IUPAC name (1R,3aS,3bR,5aΞ,9aS,9bS,11aR)-1-[(2R,5S)-5,6-Dimethylheptan-2-yl]-9a,11a-dimethylhexadecahydro-1H-cyclopenta[a]phenanthrene

Identifiers
CAS Number	25318-39-2; 511-20-6 (5α)-ergostane
3D model (JSmol)	Interactive image; (5α)-ergostane: Interactive image
ChemSpider	144332 (5α)-ergostane
PubChem CID	6857535; 164641 (5α)-ergostane
UNII	Y0XC723P4C (5α)-ergostane
CompTox Dashboard (EPA)	DTXSID70948162
- InChI: InChI=1S/C28H50/c1-19(2)20(3)10-11-21(4)24-14-15-25-23-13-12-22-9-7-8-17-27(22,5)26(23)16-18-28(24,25)6/h19-26H,7-18H2,1-6H3/t20-,21+,22+,23-,24+,25-,26-,27-,28+/m0/s1 Key: WAAWMJYYKITCGF-WTPIMUJOSA-N; InChI=1S/C28H50/c1-19(2)20(3)10-11-21(4)24-14-15-25-23-13-12-22-9-7-8-17-27(22,5)26(23)16-18-28(24,25)6/h19-26H,7-18H2,1-6H3/t20-,21+,22?,23-,24+,25-,26-,27-,28+/m0/s1 Key: WAAWMJYYKITCGF-ADGVWNIHSA-N
- SMILES: C[C@H](CC[C@H](C)C(C)C)[C@H]1CC[C@@H]2[C@@]1(CC[C@H]3[C@H]2CCC4[C@@]3(CCCC4)C)C; (5α)-ergostane: C[C@H](CC[C@H](C)C(C)C)[C@H]1CC[C@@H]2[C@@]1(CC[C@H]3[C@H]2CC[C@@H]4[C@@]3(CCCC4)C)C

Properties
Chemical formula	C_{28}H_{50}
Molar mass	386.708 g·mol^{−1}
- Except where otherwise noted, data are given for materials in their standard state (at 25 °C [77 °F], 100 kPa). Infobox references

Ergostane is a tetracyclic triterpene, also known as 24S-methylcholestane. The compound itself has no known uses; however various functionalized analogues are produced by plants and animals. The most important of these are the heavily derivatised withanolides. However simpler forms do exist, such as the sterane campestane (24R-methylcholestane). Along with cholestane and stigmastane, this sterane is used as a biomarker for early eukaryotes.

== See also ==
- Cholane
- Cholestane
- Lanostane
