= Stigmastane =

Chemical compound

Names
- IUPAC name 5ξ-Stigmastane
- Systematic IUPAC name (1R,3aS,3bR,5aΞ,9aS,9bS,11aR)-1-[(2R,5R)-5-Ethyl-6-methylheptan-2-yl]-9a,11a-dimethylhexadecahydro-1H-cyclopenta[a]phenanthrene

Identifiers
CAS Number	601-58-1; (5α): 62446-14-4
3D model (JSmol)	Interactive image
Beilstein Reference	8170826
ChEBI	CHEBI:26773
ChemSpider	5256776
KEGG	C19666
PubChem CID	6857438
UNII	EA5GAZ3ZUE
CompTox Dashboard (EPA)	DTXSID30425883
- InChI: InChI=1S/C29H52/c1-7-22(20(2)3)12-11-21(4)25-15-16-26-24-14-13-23-10-8-9-18-28(23,5)27(24)17-19-29(25,26)6/h20-27H,7-19H2,1-6H3/t21-,22-,23?,24+,25-,26+,27+,28+,29-/m1/s1 Key: GKBHKNPLNHLYHT-LWQAOISPSA-N
- SMILES: CC[C@H](CC[C@@H](C)[C@H]1CC[C@@H]2[C@@]1(CC[C@H]3[C@H]2CCC4[C@@]3(CCCC4)C)C)C(C)C

Properties
Chemical formula	C_{29}H_{52}
Molar mass	400.735 g·mol^{−1}
- Except where otherwise noted, data are given for materials in their standard state (at 25 °C [77 °F], 100 kPa). Infobox references

Stigmastane or 24R-ethylcholestane is a tetracyclic triterpene, along with cholestane and ergostane, this sterane is used as a biomarker for early eukaryotes.

5α-Stigmastane

5β-Stigmastane

== See also ==
- Stigmastanol (Stigmastan-3β-ol)
- β-Sitosterol (Stigmast-5-en-3β-ol)
- Stigmasterol (Stigmast-5,22-dien-3β-ol)
