= 24-Isopropylcholestane =

Chemical compound

24-isopropyl cholestane is an organic molecule produced by specific sponges, protists and marine algae. The identification of this molecule at high abundances in Neoproterozoic rocks has been interpreted to reflect the presence of multicellular life prior to the rapid diversification and radiation of life during the Cambrian explosion. In this transitional period at the start of the Phanerozoic, single-celled organisms evolved to produce many of the evolutionary lineages present on Earth today. Interpreting 24-isopropyl cholestane in ancient rocks as indicating the presence of sponges before this rapid diversification event alters the traditional understanding of the evolution of multicellular life and the coupling of biology to changes in end-Neoproterozoic climate. However, there are several arguments against causally linking 24-isopropyl cholestane to sponges based on considerations of marine algae and the potential alteration of organic molecules over geologic time. In particular the discovery of 24-isopropyl cholestane in rhizarian protists implies that this biomarker cannot be used on its own to trace sponges. Interpreting the presence of 24-isopropyl cholestane in the context of changing global biogeochemical cycles at the Proterozoic-Phanerozoic transition remains an area of active research.

== 24-isopropyl cholestane ==
=== Chemical argument for Precambrian sponges ===
Figure 1: 24-isopropyl cholestane (left) and 24-n-propyl cholestane (right), two organic molecules produced by sponges and marine algae relevant for studying the evolution of multicellular life in the Precambrian and Phanerozoic.

24-isopropyl cholestane (figure 1, left) is a C_{30} sterane with chemical formula C_{30}H_{54} and molecular mass 414.76 g/mol. The molecule has a cholestane skeleton with an isopropyl moiety at C_{24} and is the geologically stable form of 24-isopropyl cholesterol. A related and important molecule is 24-n-propyl cholestane (figure 1, right), also with the cholestane skeleton, but with an n-propyl moiety at C_{24}.

24-isopropyl cholestane is produced copiously by a particular group of sponges in the class Demospongiae within the phylum Porifera. Like other molecular fossils, the presence of 24-isopropyl cholestane in rocks may indicate whether demosponge were living in or near the rock's depositional environment. High abundances of 24-isopropyl cholestane are identified in the Precambrian rocks from the Hufq supergroup in Oman, suggesting the presence of sponges prior to the Cambrian explosion. However, sponges are not the only organisms that produce 24-isopropyl cholestane, so the identification of this biomarker is not uniquely linked to the presence of demosponge.

While marine pelagophyte algae predominantly produce 24-n-propylcholestane, they also produce 24-isopropyl cholestane. The two possible sources of 24-isopropyl cholestane to rocks, the demosponge and the algae, can be decoupled by considering the ratio of 24-isopropyl cholestane to 24-n-propyl cholestane. In many rocks, this ratio is 0.2-0.3. However, in rocks from Oman, the ratio of steranes is 0.52-16.1, with an average value of 1.51, which strongly suggests input of sponge organic matter. Notably, these elevated values disappear during the Cambrian, and the ratio of 24-isopropyl cholestane to 24-n-propyl cholestane is used an age-specific proxy for the Proterozoic-Phanerozoic transition.

Recent research in molecular clocks has argued that the ability to produce 24-isopropyl cholesterol evolved independently in both the demosponge and algae. However, it appears that the biosynthesis evolved earlier in the sponges, during the Neoproterozoic, and that the ability to perform the biosynthesis was not present in algae until the Phanerozoic. If correct, these results would give scientists much more confidence in interpreting elevated levels of 24-isopropyl cholestane in ancient rocks as reflecting the presence of sponges.

=== Observations of Precambrian sponges ===
Additional evidence for sponge evolution before the Cambrian explosion is found in bioclastic packstones from South Australia. Through repeated grinding and photography, researchers constructed 3D models of asymmetric structures with ~1 mm-diameter interconnected channels contained within this rock. The complex network of tunnels appears inconsistent with fungi or algae, and the researchers tentatively suggested that they are primitive sponges. This interpretation is controversial because the structures pre-date the first appearance of other sponge fossils and the structures are only known to occur within a single sedimentary sequence.

== Implications ==
While Love et al. (2009) argues for the presence of sponges in rocks below the Marinoan cap carbonate at ~635 Ma (millions of years ago), Antcliffe (2013) estimates the age of the biomarker-bearing rock to be between 645 Ma and ~580 Ma. Most recently, Gold et al. (2016) writes that the age of rocks containing 24-isoproylcholestane have an age between ~650 Ma and 540 Ma. In all cases, estimates agree that the age of the rocks containing 24-isoproylcholestane pre-date the Cambrian explosion at ~541 Ma.

The presence of sponges before ~540 Ma has profound implications for the evolution of multicellular life and the coupling of the biosphere to Neoproterozoic climate. Climate change before the Cambrian explosion and the subsequent diversification of life are intricately intertwined with understanding the causes of Snowball Earth episodes, the deposition of Banded Iron Formations, and the second step in the rise of atmospheric oxygen. In particular, the presence of sponges raises questions of the minimum dissolved O_{2} content of the oceans in the late Neoproterozoic and the transition from a euxinic Canfield ocean to the modern oxygenated deep-ocean. However, sponges appear to require very little O_{2} to survive, so their presence in the Precambrian may not provide strong constraints on Proterozoic O_{2} levels.

== Caveats ==
There are several lines of logic against interpreting 24-isopropyl cholestane as a biomarker for demosponge:

1. Much of the argument for Precambrian sponges is grounded in the observation that pelagophyte algae produce organic matter with a low ratio of 24-isopropyl cholestane to 24-n-propyl cholestane, but that this ratio is high in ancient rocks. However, the observed change in the sterane ratio could also be explained if algae changed the relative abundances in which they produce steranes over the past 600 million years. In a similar line of argument, it is possible that another extinct organism from which the algae descended produced organic matter with a higher ratio of 24-isopropyl cholestane to 24-n-propyl cholestane. As argued above, recent evidence has suggested that the algae's synthesis pathway only arose during the Phanerozoic, which tempers this argument. More generally, these concerns address the issue of insufficient specificity in molecular fossils, which plagues many biomarker studies.
2. 24-isopropyl cholestane can be formed through sedimentary diagenesis of other organic molecules, so the high ratio of 24-isopropyl cholestane to 24-n-propyl cholestane could simply reflect the post-depositional transformation of organic matter. Some research has addressed this concern by showing a lack of alteration in other organic molecules, such as hopanes, but subsequent analysis has questioned whether the molecules with minimal alteration could have been contamination from modern petroleum-derived oil.
3. There may have been a group of bacteria living symbiotically with the sponges that also produced 24-isopropyl cholestane. If these bacteria produced the biomarker throughout geologic time, its presence would not be strictly indicative of demosponge. However, as with the marine algae, analysis of the ratio of 24-isopropyl cholestane to 24-n-propyl cholestane may clarify the source of the compounds.
4. It is strange to find sponge biomarkers before the Cambrian explosion without accompanying sponge fossils (although there is tentative evidence for sponge-like structures in the latest-Neoproterozoic). Moreover, once fossils of sponges do appear during the Paleozoic, the ratio of 24-isopropyl cholestane to 24-n-propylcholestane returns to its background value. This is surprising because we might expect the ratio to stay elevated or even to increase as metazoa diversified and sponges proliferated.
