= Fusidane =

Names
- IUPAC name 29-Norprotostane
- Systematic IUPAC name (1R,3aS,3bS,5aS,6R,9aS,9bS,11aS)-3a,3b,6,9a-Tetramethyl-1-[(2R)-6-methylheptan-2-yl]hexadecahydro-1H-cyclopenta[a]phenanthrene
- Other names 29-nor protostane

Identifiers
3D model (JSmol)	Interactive image
PubChem CID	101786193
- InChI: InChI=1S/C29H52/c1-20(2)10-8-11-21(3)23-15-18-28(6)25(23)13-14-26-27(5)17-9-12-22(4)24(27)16-19-29(26,28)7/h20-26H,8-19H2,1-7H3/t21-,22-,23-,24+,25+,26+,27+,28+,29+/m1/s1 Key: NOEMICWEDLSYHV-SNZQGMLHSA-N
- SMILES: C[C@@H]1CCC[C@]2([C@H]1CC[C@]3([C@H]2CC[C@@H]4[C@@]3(CC[C@@H]4[C@H](C)CCCC(C)C)C)C)C

Properties
Chemical formula	C_{29}H_{52}
Molar mass	400.735 g·mol^{−1}
- Except where otherwise noted, data are given for materials in their standard state (at 25 °C [77 °F], 100 kPa). Infobox references

Fusidane or 29-norprotostane is a tetracyclic triterpene and the parent structure of a series of steroids, such as the antibiotics fusidic acid, helvolic acid, and cephalosporin P1.

Fusidic acid

== See also ==
- Protostane
- Dammarane
- Cucurbitane
