= Campestane =

Names
- IUPAC name 5ξ-Campestane
- Systematic IUPAC name (1R,3aS,3bR,5aΞ,9aS,9bS,11aR)-1-[(2R,5R)-5,6-Dimethylheptan-2-yl]-9a,11a-dimethylhexadecahydro-1H-cyclopenta[a]phenanthrene

Identifiers
CAS Number	5α-Campestane: 50897-35-3
3D model (JSmol)	Interactive image
ChEBI	CHEBI:35518
ChemSpider	5256868
PubChem CID	6857532
- InChI: InChI=1S/C28H50/c1-19(2)20(3)10-11-21(4)24-14-15-25-23-13-12-22-9-7-8-17-27(22,5)26(23)16-18-28(24,25)6/h19-26H,7-18H2,1-6H3/t20-,21-,22?,23+,24-,25+,26+,27+,28-/m1/s1 Key: WAAWMJYYKITCGF-SULSJXDKSA-N
- SMILES: C[C@H](CC[C@@H](C)C(C)C)[C@H]1CC[C@@H]2[C@@]1(CC[C@H]3[C@H]2CCC4[C@@]3(CCCC4)C)C

Properties
Chemical formula	C_{28}H_{50}
Molar mass	386.708 g·mol^{−1}
- Except where otherwise noted, data are given for materials in their standard state (at 25 °C [77 °F], 100 kPa). Infobox references

Campestane or 24R-methylcholestane is a tetracyclic triterpene. Its derivative campesterol (campest-5-en-3β-ol) was first isolated from the rapeseed (Brassica campestris), hence the name.

== See also ==
- Cholestane
- Ergostane (24S-methylcholestane)
- Campestanol (Campestan-3β-ol)
