= Dinosterol =

Names
- IUPAC name (22E)-4α,23-Dimethyl-5α-ergost-22-en-3β-ol
- Systematic IUPAC name (1R,3aS,3bS,5aS,6S,7S,9aR,9bS,11aR)-6,9a,11a-Trimethyl-1-[(2R,3E,5R)-4,5,6-trimethylhept-3-en-2-yl]hexadecahydro-1H-cyclopenta[a]phenanthren-7-ol

Identifiers
CAS Number	58670-63-6
3D model (JSmol)	Interactive image
ChemSpider	4945298
PubChem CID	6441076
UNII	91FGT6HJ59
CompTox Dashboard (EPA)	DTXSID901030126
- InChI: InChI=1S/C30H52O/c1-18(2)21(5)19(3)17-20(4)24-11-12-26-23-9-10-25-22(6)28(31)14-16-30(25,8)27(23)13-15-29(24,26)7/h17-18,20-28,31H,9-16H2,1-8H3/b19-17+/t20-,21-,22+,23+,24-,25+,26+,27+,28+,29-,30+/m1/s1 Key: LPFIPZJIWTZLEY-DAABMGJCSA-N; InChI=1/C30H52O/c1-18(2)21(5)19(3)17-20(4)24-11-12-26-23-9-10-25-22(6)28(31)14-16-30(25,8)27(23)13-15-29(24,26)7/h17-18,20-28,31H,9-16H2,1-8H3/b19-17+/t20-,21-,22+,23+,24-,25+,26+,27+,28+,29-,30+/m1/s1 Key: LPFIPZJIWTZLEY-DAABMGJCBY
- SMILES: O[C@H]3CC[C@@]4([C@@H]2[C@H]([C@@H]1CC[C@H]([C@@H](\C=C(/C)[C@H](C)C(C)C)C)[C@@]1(C)CC2)CC[C@H]4[C@@H]3C)C

Properties
Chemical formula	C_{30}H_{52}O
Molar mass	428.745 g·mol^{−1}
- Except where otherwise noted, data are given for materials in their standard state (at 25 °C [77 °F], 100 kPa). verify (what is ?) Infobox references

Dinosterol (4α,23,24-trimethyl-5α-cholest-22E-en-3β-ol) is a 4α-methyl sterol that is produced by several genera of dinoflagellates and is rarely found in other classes of protists. The steroidal alkane, dinosterane, is the 'molecular fossil' of dinosterol, meaning that dinosterane has the same carbon skeleton as dinosterol, but lacks dinosterol's hydroxyl group and olefin functionality. As such, dinosterane is often used as a biomarker to identify the presence of dinoflagellates in sediments.

== Chemical structure ==
Dinosterol is a C_{30} sterol characterized by four fused rings (three six-membered and one five-membered), seven methyl groups, an olefin in its side-chain, and a secondary alcohol. The double bond in the side chain is located at the 22 position, and dinosterol's methyl groups are at the 20, 23, 24 and 25 positions of the side chain. The structure of dinosterol is established as 4α,23,24-trimethyl-5α-cholest-22-en-3β-ol.

Dinosterol contains an unusual pattern of side-chain alkylation with methyl groups at C-23 and C-24. This substitution motif was thought to be unique to dinoflagellate sterols, until Volkman et al. (1993) found a diatom belonging to the genus Navicula, which contains several 4-methyl sterols including dinosterol.

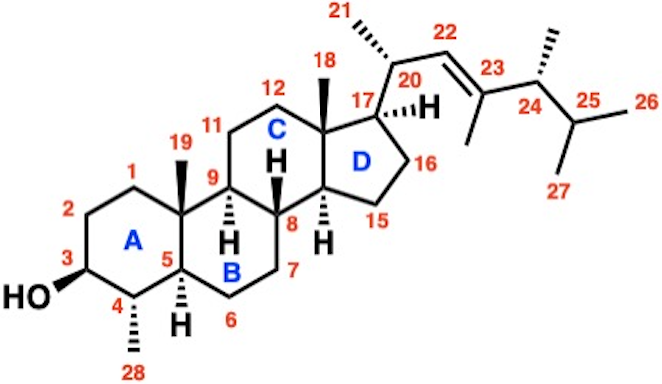
Dinosterol Numbering Scheme (IUPAC)

== Biosynthesis ==
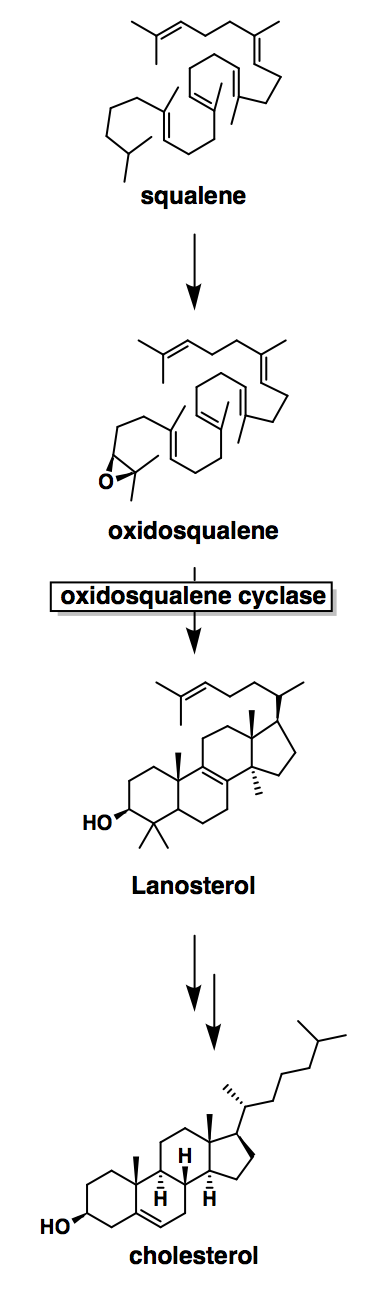
In the synthesis of cholesterol, mevalonate is made from acetyl-CoA. Mevalonate is used to synthesize isoprenoid units, which are used to generate squalene, which undergoes a cyclization after epoxidation to form lanosterol. Lanosterol undergoes several subsequent reactions to produce cholesterol.

4-Methyl sterols are intermediates in the biosynthesis of 4-desmethyl sterols and are known to accumulate under anaerobic conditions. The synthesis of dinosterol begins with the cyclization of squalene to lanosterol, but then diverges from cholesterol biosynthesis. The biosynthesis of dinosterol's side chain has been investigated in dinoflagellates using methionine-[CD_{3}]. The sequence of side-chain alkylations is thought to be initiated by the formation of 4α,24-dimethyl-5α-cholest-24(28)-en-3β-ol, followed by reduction to 4α,24-dimethyl-5α-cholestan-3β-ol, then introduction of the Δ^{22}-double bond to form 4α,24-dimethyl-5α-cholest-22E-en-3β-ol and then methylation at C-23 to form 4α23,24-trimethyl- 5α-cholest-22E-en-3β-ol (dinosterol).

In a study on dinosterol side chain synthesis in the marine heterotrophic dinoflagellate, Crypthecodinium cohnii, the dinoflagellates were cultured with methionine-[CD_{3}]. GC-MS analysis revealed that the C-23 methyl group contained three deuterium atoms that were introduced by transmethylation from methionine. The C-24 methyl group contained only two deuterium atoms, consistent with a 24-methylenesterol intermediate, which is reduced to the resulting 24-methyl side chain. This mechanism has been previously reported in fungi, a chrysophyte alga and a diatom. Importantly, no deuterium was incorporated into cholesterol or cholesta-5,7-dien-3β-ol, which are the major 4-methyl-sterols in Crypthecodinium cohnii. A suggested biosynthetic mechanism for side chain alkylations at C-23 and C-24 in dinosterol has been proposed.

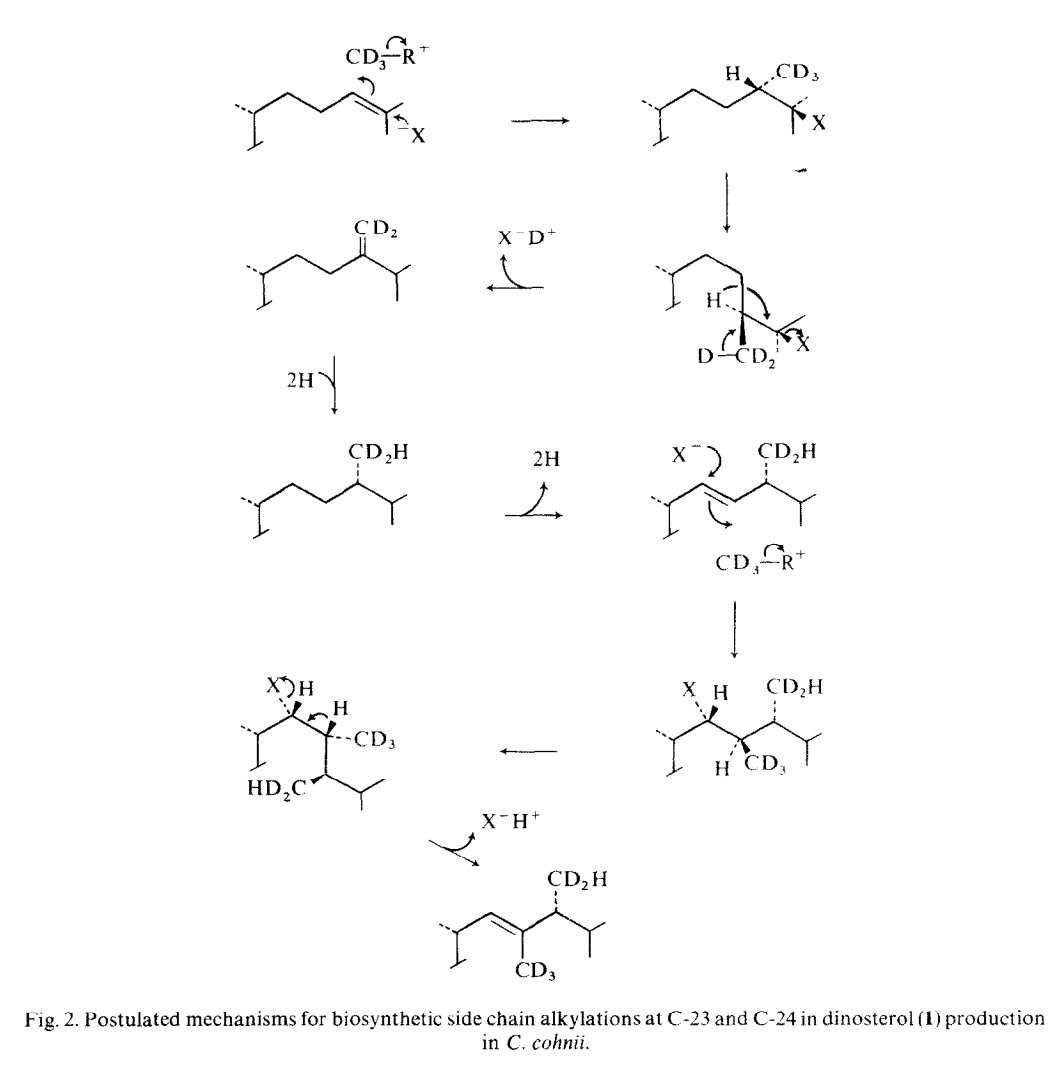
Proposed biosynthesis of the C-23 and C-24 alkylations in the dinosterol side chain (Giner et al. (1991).

== Biological occurrence ==
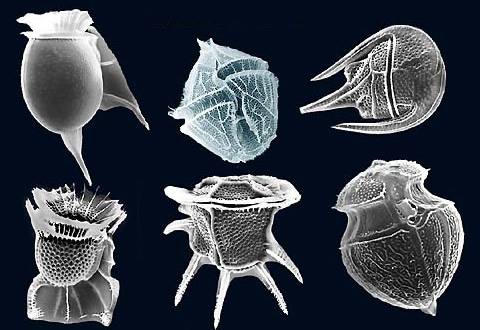
Dinoflagellates are unicellular protists containing two flagella. Dinoflagellates are both marine and freshwater plankton.

Dinoflagellates are the primary source of dinosteral. Dinoflagellates are unicellular, aquatic organisms that live in both marine and inland environments and are a prominent constituent of phytoplankton. Dinoflagellates are often characterized by their uncommon sterol distribution, dominated by 4α-methyl sterols derived from lanosterol rather than cycloartenol. In many cases, the most abundant sterol in dinoflagellates is dinosterol. Dinosterol is often used a biomarker in geochemical research because it is produced almost exclusively by dinoflagellates and is found in many environments. In addition to several species of dinoflagellates, dinosterol has also been isolated from the diatom Nivicula sp. (CS-46c) collected from Port Hacking, New South Wales, Australia.

== Preservation and diagenesis ==
Steroids are often preserved in petroleum as saturated and aromatic steroidal hydrocarbons that result from transformations occurring during diagenesis. After senescence of steroids from aquatic producers, they undergo rapid re-mineralization under aerobic conditions in the upper water column. A small percentage of the intact sterols produced in the euphotic zone endure diagenesis, where microbial mediated transformations effectively yield compounds that can then be related back to their parent sterols and are more stable in the geologic record. The preservation of sterols is often limited, but is enhanced by anaerobic conditions during their deposition and subsequent diagenesis, in particular, early sulfurization and reduction mediated by sulfur species.

Intact dinosterol has been reported from sediments of the presumed late Jurassic age, possibly due to incomplete degradation of lipids in the water column under high productivity conditions in the presence of sulfate reducers. These transformations are controlled by microbial activity and low temperature physiochemical reactions. Thermodynamically driven abiotic physicochemical reactions further alter the steroids by causing complete aromatization, isomerization and cracking of the steroids. These more stable compounds co-exist with their precursor sterols and their intermediate diagenetic products can only occur in immature sediments when incomplete microbial degradation has occurred.

== Measurement techniques ==
Standard organic geochemical methods are employed to prepare samples of dinosterol for analysis. Collected algae samples can be centrifuged and then lyophilized. A Bligh and Dyer extraction can then be performed to isolate the major lipid classes. Lipid samples are often derivatized with bis(trimethylsilyl)trifluoroacetamide (BSTFA) for gas chromatography-mass spectrometry (GC-MS) analysis.

For dinosterol derivatives, analysis is typically carried out by capillary gas chromatography and capillary gas chromatography-mass spectrometry. The mass spectrum of dinosterol as the TMS-ether shows characteristic ions at m/z 500 (M^{+}), 429, 388, 359, 339 and 271. The base peak at m/z 69 is diagnostic for the A:2-unsaturated 23,24-dimethyl sidechain. Other purification techniques for dinosterol include various combinations of thin layer (TLC) and column chromatography with a variety of phases, AgNO_{3} impregnated Silica gel chromatography, normal phase-high performance liquid chromatography (NP-HPLC), and reversed phase-high performance liquid chromatography (RP-HPL).

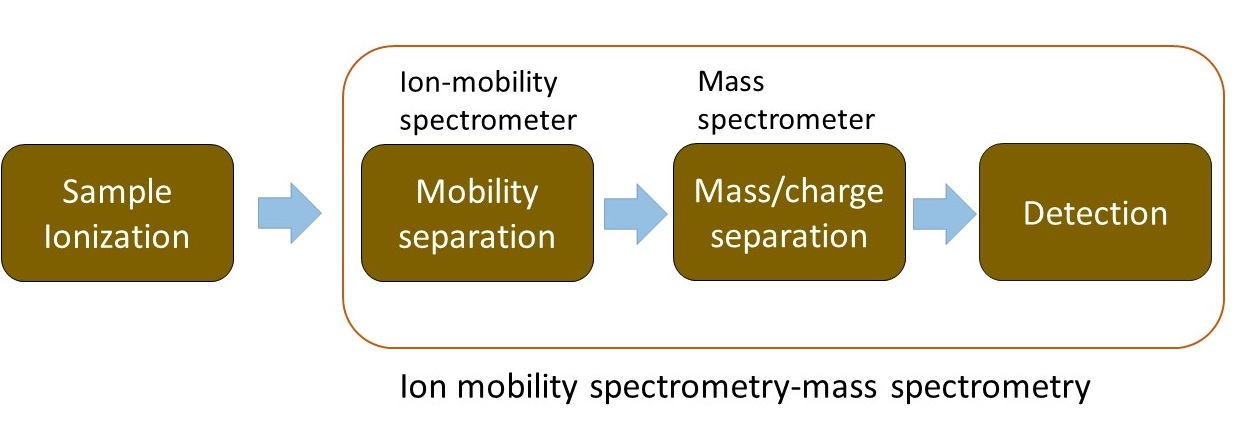
Mass spectrometry is an analytical method that measures the mass to charge ratio (m/z) of molecules present in a sample. Often mass spectrometers are used to identify compounds via molecular weight determination.

An alternative method has been proposed for purifying dinosterol from complex mixtures of sedimentary lipids for the purpose of hydrogen isotope analysis via gas chromatography-isotope ratio mass spectrometry (GC-IRMS). Reversed phase-high performance liquid chromatography (RP-HPLC) is used to separate dinosterol from structurally similar 4α-methyl sterols that co-elute on GC analysis, which allows for baseline resolution of dinosterol. For samples that contain a variety of 4a-methyl sterols, RP-HPLC purification can be preceded by NP-HPLC purification.

== Use as a biomarker ==
Dinosterol is used as a biomarker for organic matter derived from dinoflagellates in sediments and seawater. Biomarkers are organic compounds that are indicative of former life in sediments, seawater and oil. The presence of the saturated hydrocarbon counterpart, dinosterane, is used as evidence that some of the organic matter present in ancient sediments may have been derived from dinoflagellates.

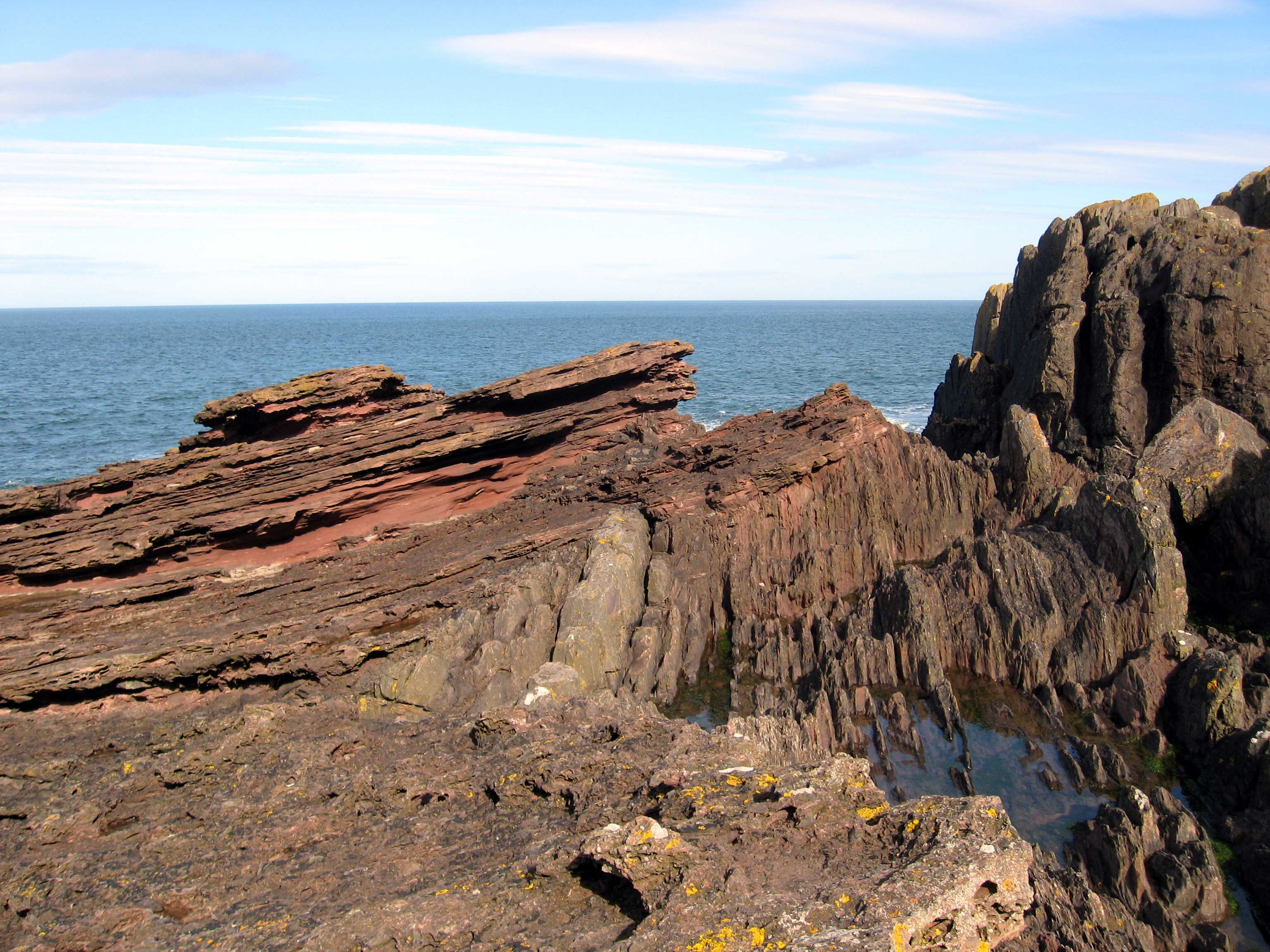
Biomarkers are lipids derived from organisms that lived long ago, they can exist in sediments and oils over the course of hundreds of millions of years. Crude oils from source rock can be examined to trace biomarkers.

Dinosterol has been used as an indicator for dinoflagellate production in the Cariaco Basin. In such studies, it has been revealed that the accumulation of dinosterol peaks at a rate of almost 900 mg compound/cm^{2}/yr during the Younger Dryas.

Hydrogen isotope ratios in dinosterols can serve to reconstruct salinity semi-quantitatively.

Some studies have revealed that certain dinoflagellates produce sterols that have the potential to serve as genera-specific biomarkers. Recent work showed that dinoflagellate genera, which formed discrete clusters in the 18S rDNA-based phylogeny, shared similar sterol compositions. This suggested that the sterol compositions of dinoflagellates are explained by the evolutionary history of this lineage.

=== Dinosterol in a Marine Diatom ===
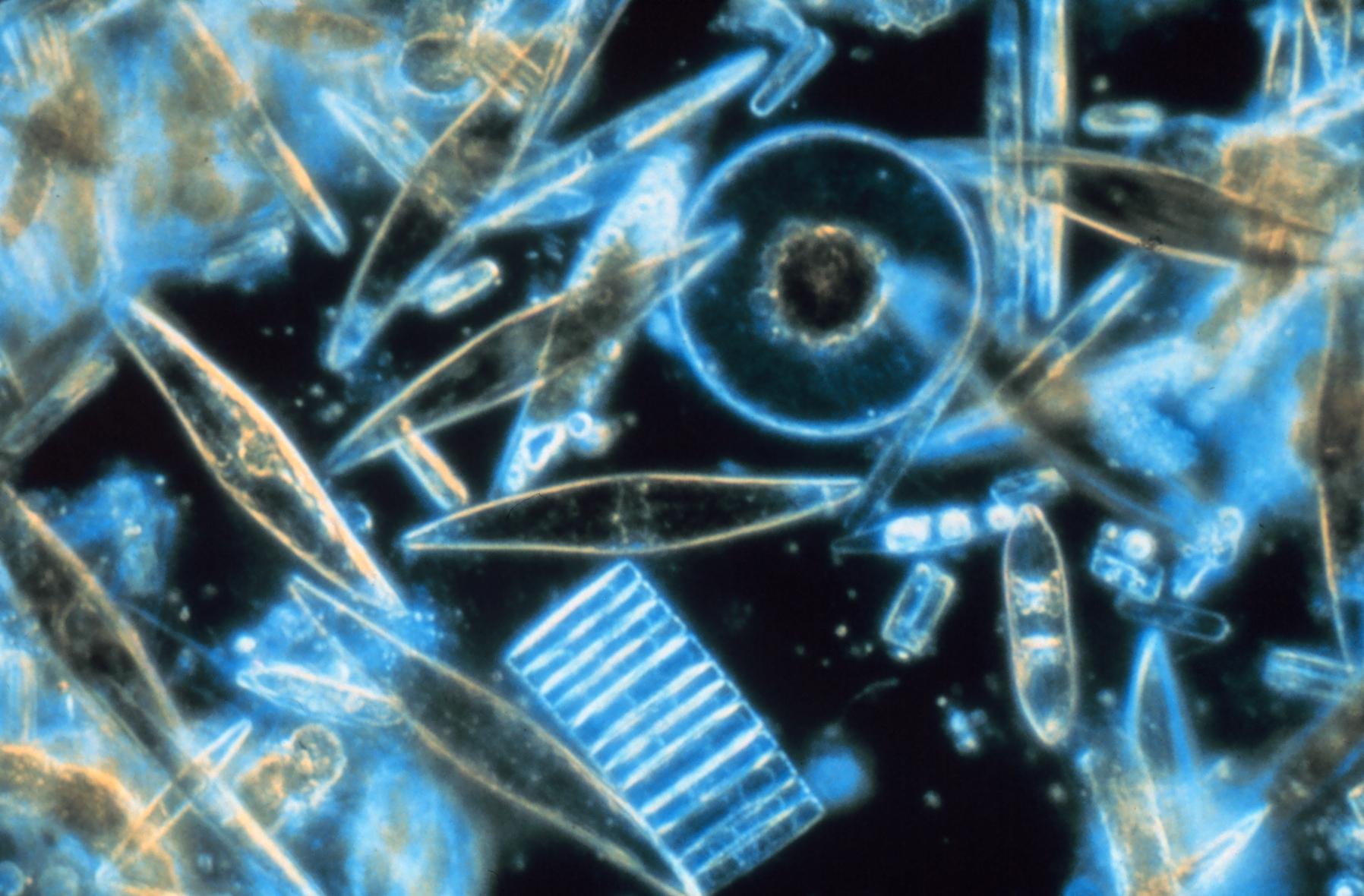
Diatoms are photosynthesizing algae that are found in almost every aquatic environment. Their cell walls are composed of opaline silica. Diatoms are an important source of energy rich long-chain fatty acids that feed the entire food web.

In 1992, Volkman et al. reported the first evidence of dinosterol in a laboratory culture of a marine diatom Navicula sp., indicating that diatoms may be a source of dinosterol in marine sediments. Within this diatom, 4-methyl sterols comprised less than 0.7% abundance, whereas these sterols are much more abundant in dinoflagellates. Notably, the stereochemistry of the C-24 alkyl substituent in the sterols of diatoms is 24α, whereas in dinoflagellates it is 24β. If the C-24 alkylated sterols in Navicula (CS-46c) are the epimers of dinosterol and dinostanol, then this may be used to discriminate between dinoflagellate and diatom sources of "dinosterol" in sediments. However, the C-24 substituents in steroidal compounds rapidly isomerize in sediments such that a mixture of C-23 and C-24 isomers is formed. Therefore, once the sediment reaches a certain thermal maturity, the stereochemistry at the C-24 position can no longer be used to distinguish between diatom and dinoflagellate sources of dinosterol.

=== Phytoplankton Community in the Arabian Sea ===
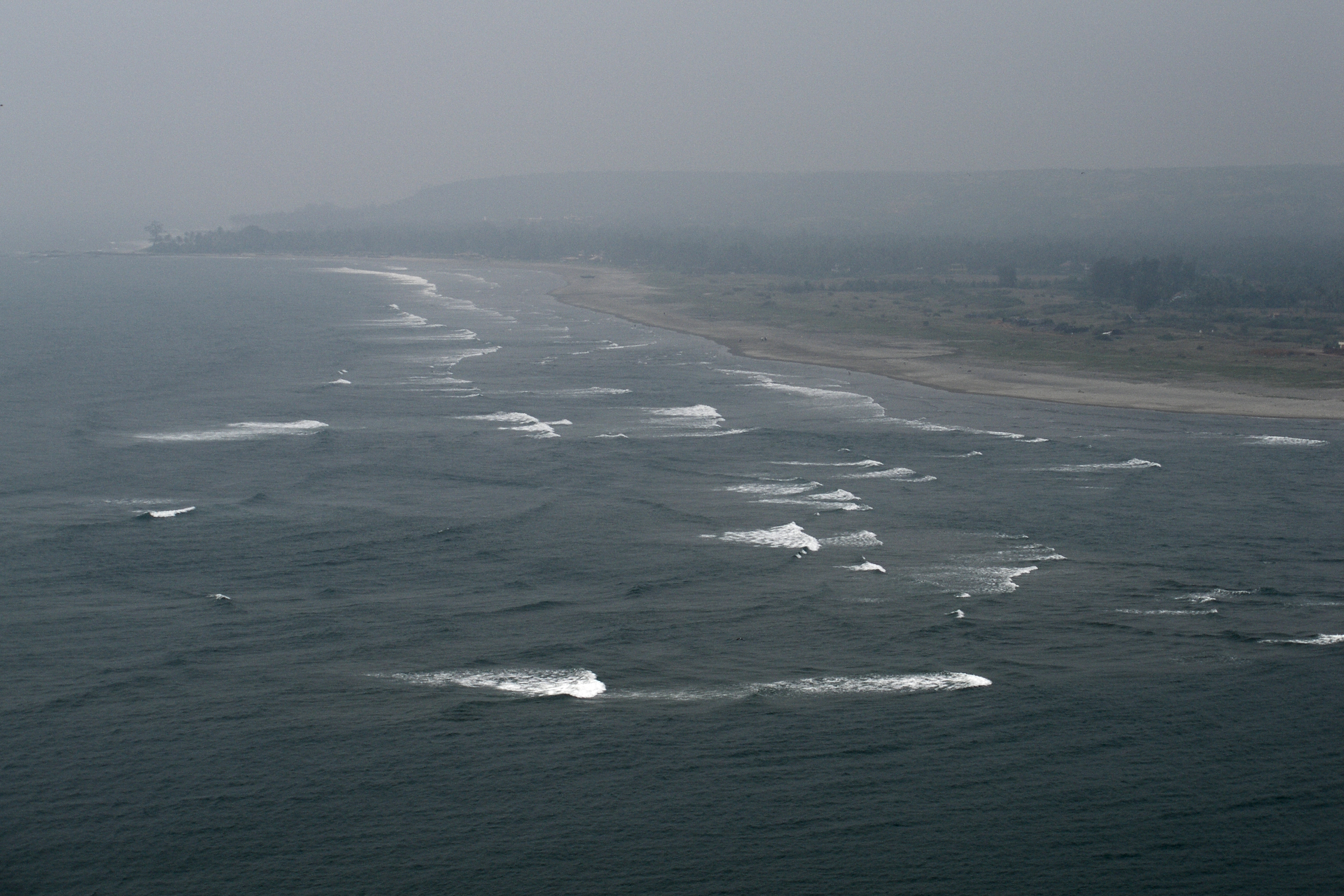
Significant geochemical studies have been conducted on the Arabian Sea. These have mainly been focused on the clay mineralogy and elemental distribution of the Arabian Sea. The Arabian Sea experiences a reversal of monsoonal winds that result in large seasonal variations in upwelling and related primary productivity, which has a large impact on the distribution of elements in the sediment.

Dinosterol has been used as a biomarker for dinoflagellates whose sedimentary concentration has been correlated with changes in marine production rates. In a study by Schubert et al., it was shown that dinosterol has a concordant concentration maximum that coincides with organic carbon maxima over the past 200,000 years in a sediment core from the northeastern Arabian Sea. In this study, dinosterol was used to trace changes in ocean production in the Arabian Sea. Due to similar distributions of dinosterol and brassicasterol, a biomarker indicative of diatom abundances, it was concluded that the relative contributions of the dominant members of the phytoplankton community to production were uniform on timescales greater than 3,000–4,000 years over the past 200,000 years, despite overall paleoproduction having changed dramatically. Cross-spectral analysis of overall marine production (C_{org}) and biomarkers, dinosterol and brassicasterol, show very high spectral coherencies, supporting the correlation between C_{org} and dinosterol.

=== Dinoflagellates in the Adriatic Sea ===
The marine dinoflagellates: Prorocentrum micans, Lingulodinium polyedra, Gymnodinium sp., and Alexandrium tamarense, were collected from the Adriatic Sea during red-tide blooms and their 4-methyl sterol content was investigated. Dinosterol is the major component in P. micans, L. polyedra, and Gymnodinium strains, suggesting that dinosterol is a good biomarker because of its high abundance in most of the analyzed dinoflagellates.

=== Dinoflagellates in the Arctic Ocean ===
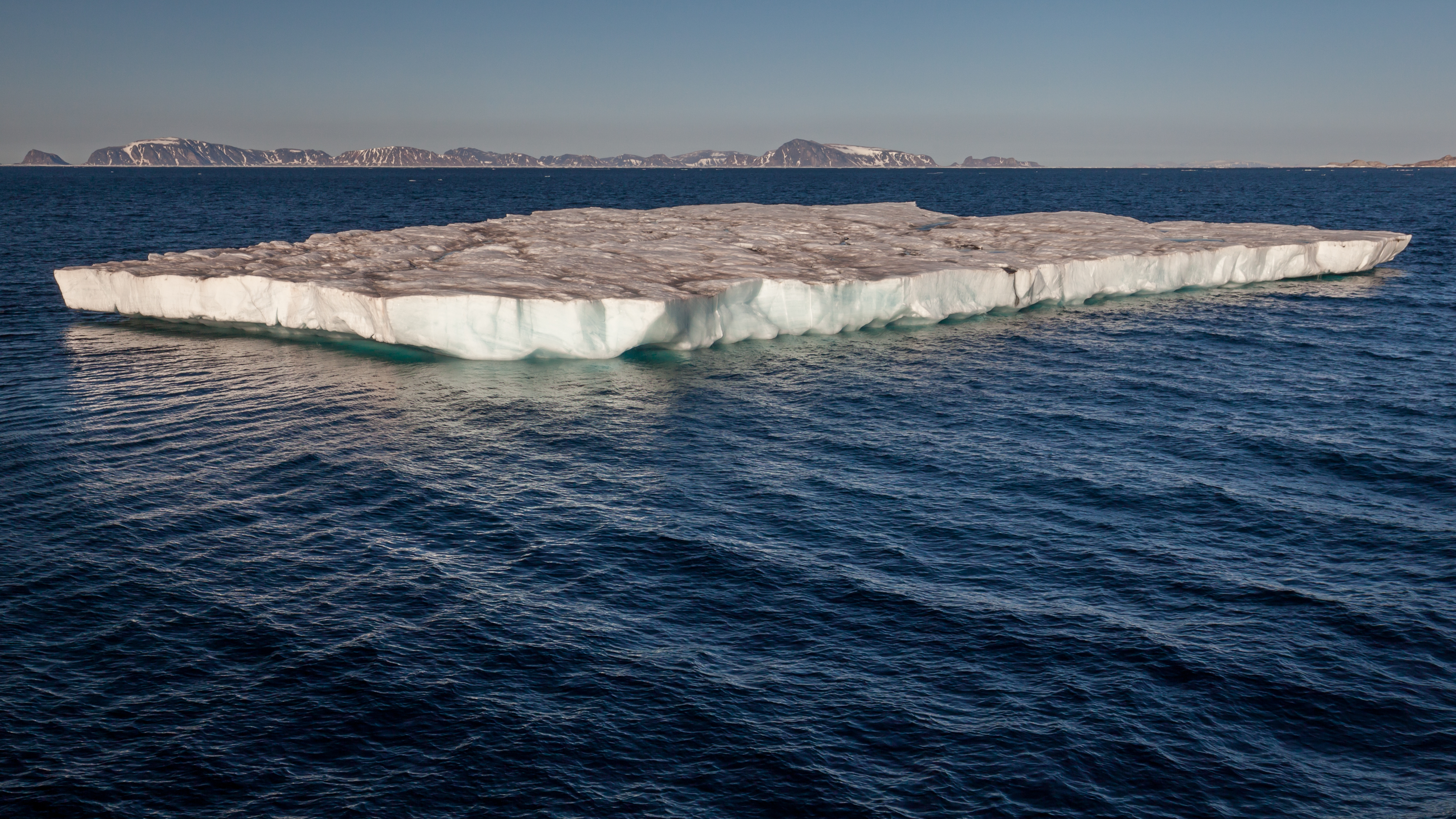
The Arctic Ocean is a climate-relevant water basin. Its distribution of heat and freshwater, which is determined by the relative contributions of different source waters, modulates deep water formation, sea‐ice extent, and ecosystem functioning. Geochemical tracers have played a central role in accessing the distributions of water types within the Arctic Ocean.

In a study by Belicka et al., six sediment cores from two shelf-basin transects in the Chukchi and Beaufort Seas of the Arctic Ocean were examined in order to compare the sources and preservation of organic carbon between the two differing depositional regimes. This study found an unexpected correlation between dinosterol and α-amyrin, which is found in terrestrial plants, in shelf and slope sediments, in particular the Beaufort Shelf, suggesting that dinoflagellates contribute significantly to phytoplankton abundance in areas of seasonal open water. Dinosterol was only observed above the permanent ice pack, suggesting that dinoflagellates are restricted to open waters, which in the Arctic occur near the shallow shelves. Consequently, dinosterol may be a potential indicator of the history of open water conditions.

=== Hydrogen Isotope Analysis ===
Hydrogen isotope analysis is used to help reconstruct environmental change. Dinosterol is a particularly good target for such analysis because it is commonly found in high concentrations in a variety of aquatic environments and is well preserved in the sediment record. Hydrogen isotope analysis requires a purification method that achieves GC baseline resolution and is high yielding. Dinosterol coelutes with other sterols during GC; therefore a procedure for proper purification that involves reversed phase-high performance liquid chromatography (RP-HPLC) was developed by Atwood et al.

The hydrogen isotope ratios in dinosterol can be used to reconstruct salinity semi-quantitatively. In a study by Schwab et al., the hydrogen isotope ratio of dinosterol was measured in suspended particles and surface sediments from the Chesapeake Bay estuary. The D/H ratio was found to decrease by 0.99 ± 0.23% per unit increase in salinity over the salinity range 10–29 PSU. The correlation between hydrogen isotopic response and salinity may result from diminished exchange of water between algal cells and their environment, lower growth rates and/or increased production of osmolytes at high salinities.
