= Diplopterol =

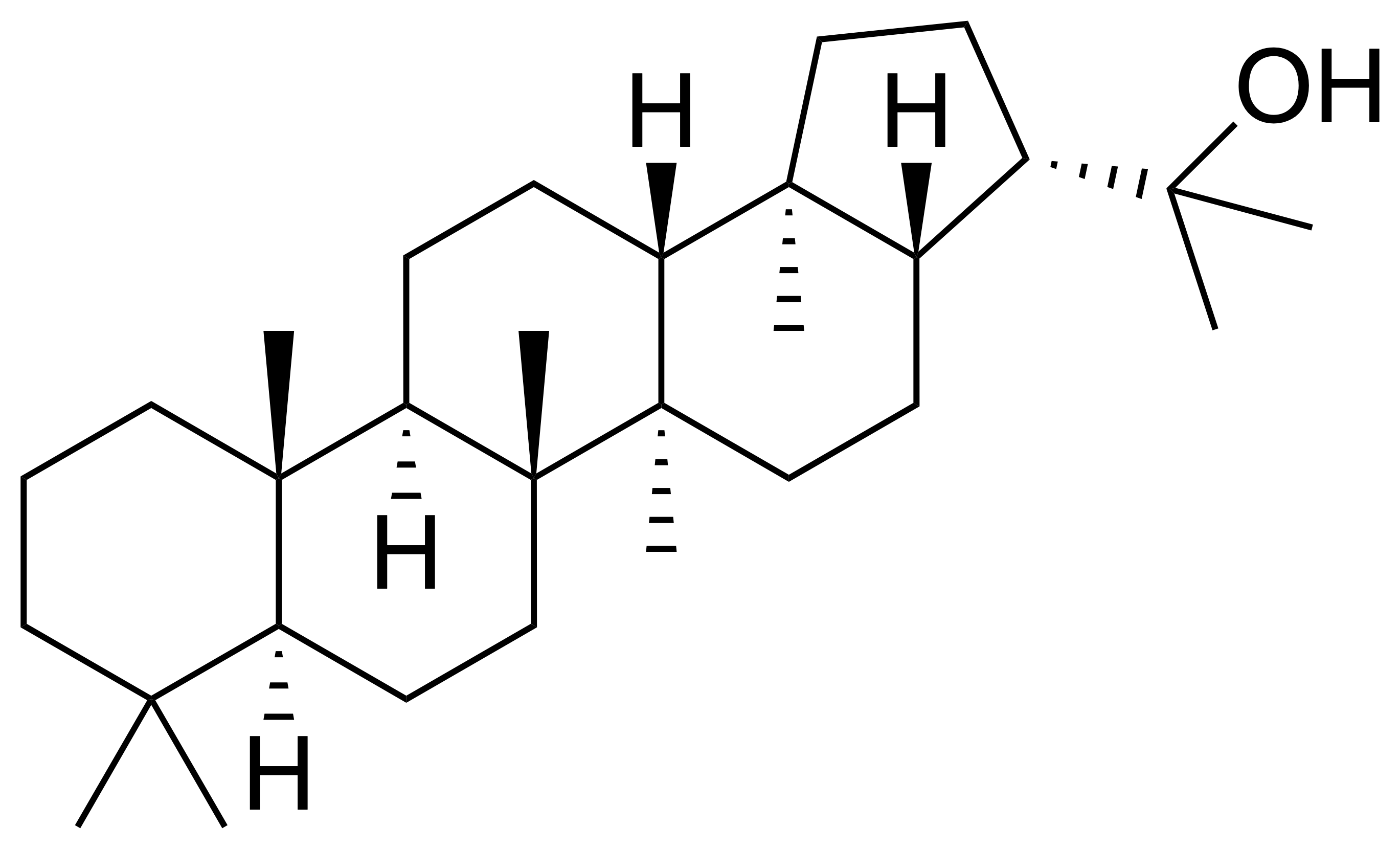

Names
- Systematic IUPAC name 2-[(3S,3aS,5aR,5bR,7aS,11aS,11bR,13aR,13bS)-5a,5b,8,8,11a,13b-hexamethyl-1,2,3,3a,4,5,6,7,7a,9,10,11,11b,12,13,13a-hexadecahydrocyclopenta[a]chrysen-3-yl]propan-2-ol
- Other names hopan-22-ol 22-hydroxyhopane 22-hopanol

Identifiers
CAS Number	1721-59-1
3D model (JSmol)	Interactive image
ChEBI	CHEBI:36484
ChEMBL	ChEMBL2448591
ChemSpider	144542
KEGG	C06309
PubChem CID	164874
CompTox Dashboard (EPA)	DTXSID40169206
- InChI: InChI=1S/C30H52O/c1-25(2)15-9-16-28(6)22(25)14-19-30(8)24(28)11-10-23-27(5)17-12-20(26(3,4)31)21(27)13-18-29(23,30)7/h20-24,31H,9-19H2,1-8H3/t20-,21-,22-,23+,24+,27-,28-,29+,30+/m0/s1 Key: PNJBOAVCVAVRGR-UDCAXGDQSA-N
- SMILES: C[C@]12CC[C@@H]([C@@H]1CC[C@@]3([C@@H]2CC[C@H]4[C@]3(CC[C@@H]5[C@@]4(CCCC5(C)C)C)C)C)C(C)(C)O

Properties
Chemical formula	C_{30}H_{52}O
Molar mass	428.7 g/mol
- Except where otherwise noted, data are given for materials in their standard state (at 25 °C [77 °F], 100 kPa). Infobox references

Diplopterol is a triterpenoid molecule commonly produced by bacteria, ferns, and a few protozoans. This compound, classified as a member of the hopanoid family, is synthesized from triterpenoid precursor squalene. It is generally believed that hopanoids serve a similar function in bacteria as that of sterols in eukaryotes, which involves modulating membrane fluidity. Diplopterol serves as a useful biomarker for prokaryotic life, along with oxygen content at the time of sediment deposition.

== Background ==
Diplopterol, also known as hopan-22-ol, is a lipid natural product belonging to the family of triterpenoids known as the hopanoids. These compounds share a common pentacyclic core with title compound hopane, yet they demonstrate great structural diversity. Hopanoids are produced by a wide variety of prokaryotic organisms, and thus are often also referred to as bacteriohopanoids. They are believed to play a vital role in tuning membrane permeability in response to external stressors such as extreme temperature or pH. Their structural relatives, sterols, perform a similar function in eukaryotic cells. Diplopterol is unique among the hopanes in that it contains an unusual tertiary hydroxyl moiety on the E ring.

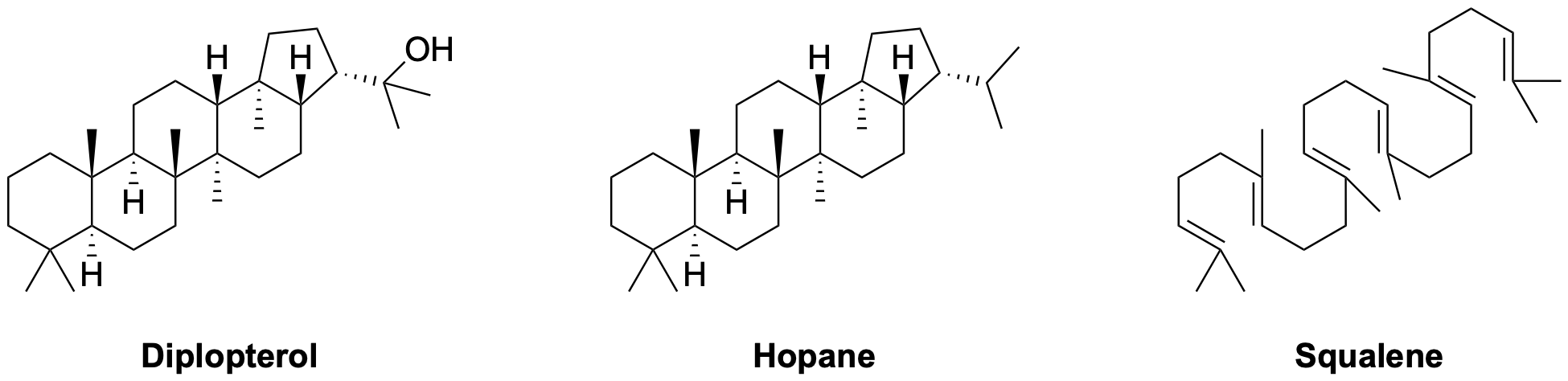
Structure of hopanoid natural product diplopterol, in addition to the hopanoid family title compound hopane and terpenoid precursor squalene.

== Biological characteristics ==
=== Biological occurrence ===
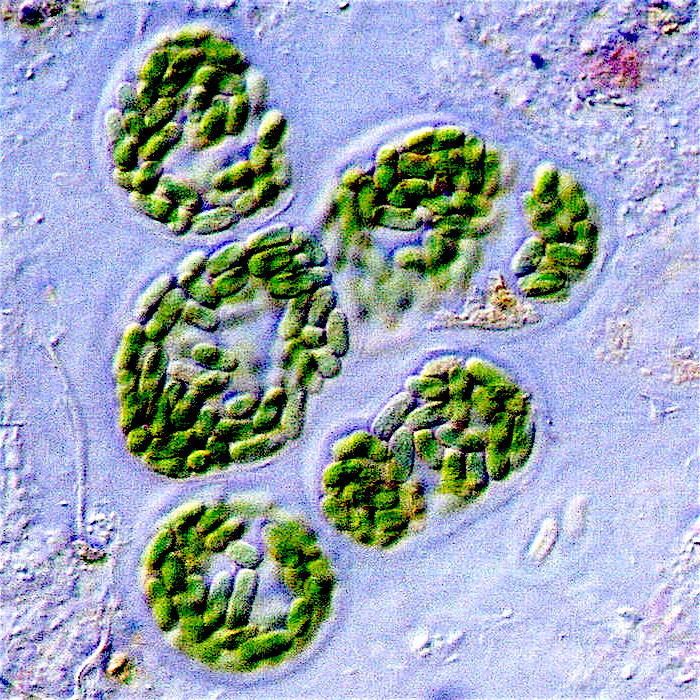
Diplopterol is produced by a wide variety of prokaryotic organisms such as the cyanobacterium shown here.

Diplopterol has been observed in a wide variety of bacteria, cyanobacteria, and purple non-sulfur bacteria. Examples include cellulose-producing bacteria Acetobacter xylinum and bovine-associated bacteria Mycoplasma mycoides, which both have been shown to utilize diplopterol for structural support. Although less common, diplopterol has also been found in some eukaryotic organisms which can also produce sterols, the primary example being protozoan Tetrahymena pyriformis. It is unclear whether such organisms require diplopterol for structural reasons or some other function. Finally, the majority of fern species produce diplopterol, in addition to diploptene and fernene.

=== Biosynthesis ===
The proposed biosynthesis of diplopterol involves a cascade cyclization of terpenoid precursor squalene by the enzyme hopane-squalene cyclase. This highly efficient reaction forms nine stereogenic centers and five rings simultaneously. The oxygen atom present in the alcohol group is believed to originate from water, as this process occurs in the absence of molecular oxygen. Diplopterol can undergo further structural modifications to form a variety of hopanoid derivatives. Additions most often occur at the C-35 position, or on the side chain.

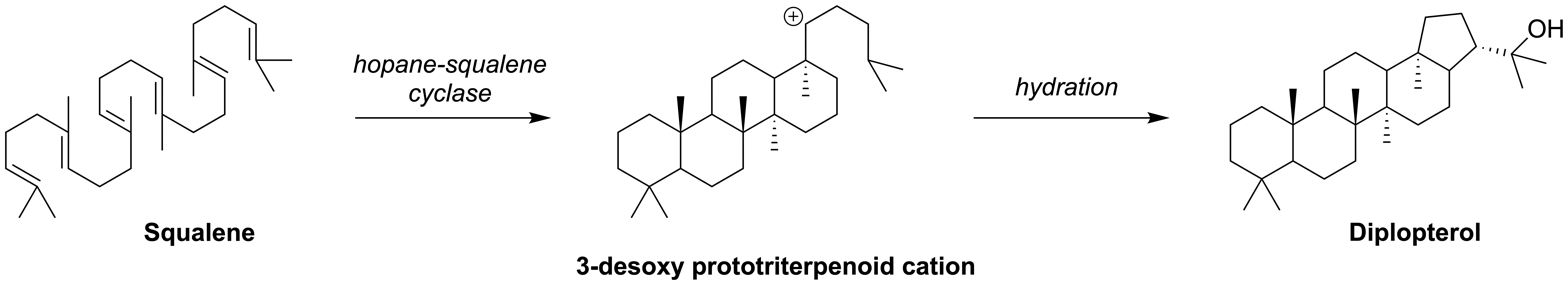
Proposed pathway for diplopterol biosynthesis from squalene utilizing a hopane-squalene cyclase enzyme.

=== Membrane properties ===
There has recently been in-depth investigation of the properties of diplopterol as a cell membrane component. Researchers compared the monolayer-forming ability of diplopterol to that of cholesterol (animals), ergosterol (fungi) and stigmasterol (plants). In general, they found that pure diplopterol monolayers had similar properties to sterol films, which supports the hypothesis that diplopterol performs similar functions involving membrane fluidity tuning.

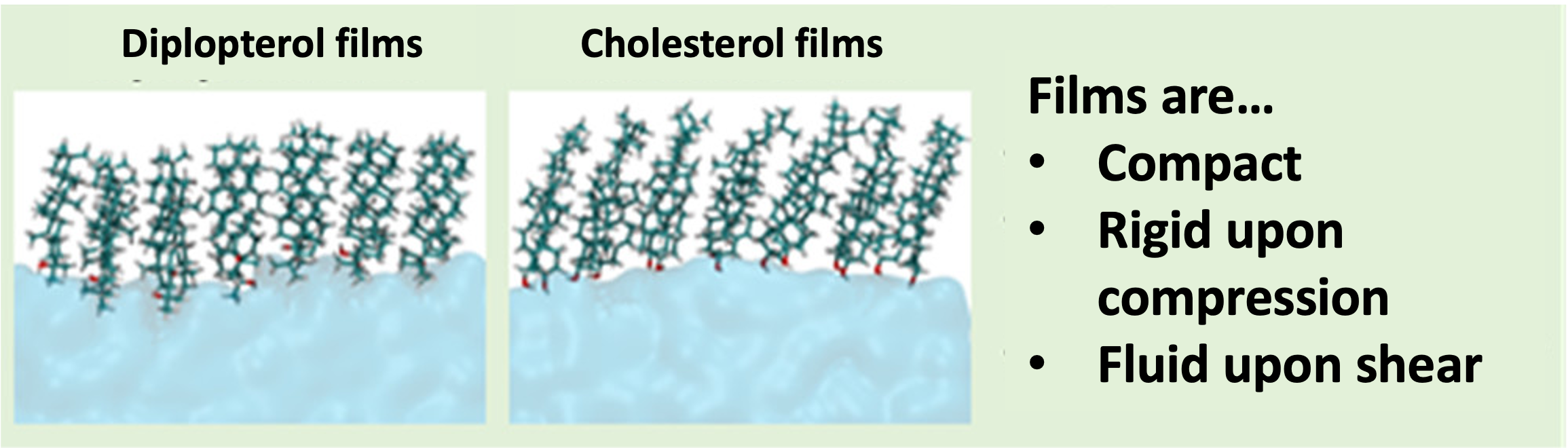
Monolayer-forming properties of diplopterol compared to cholesterol. Figure modified from Wilke et al. 2019.

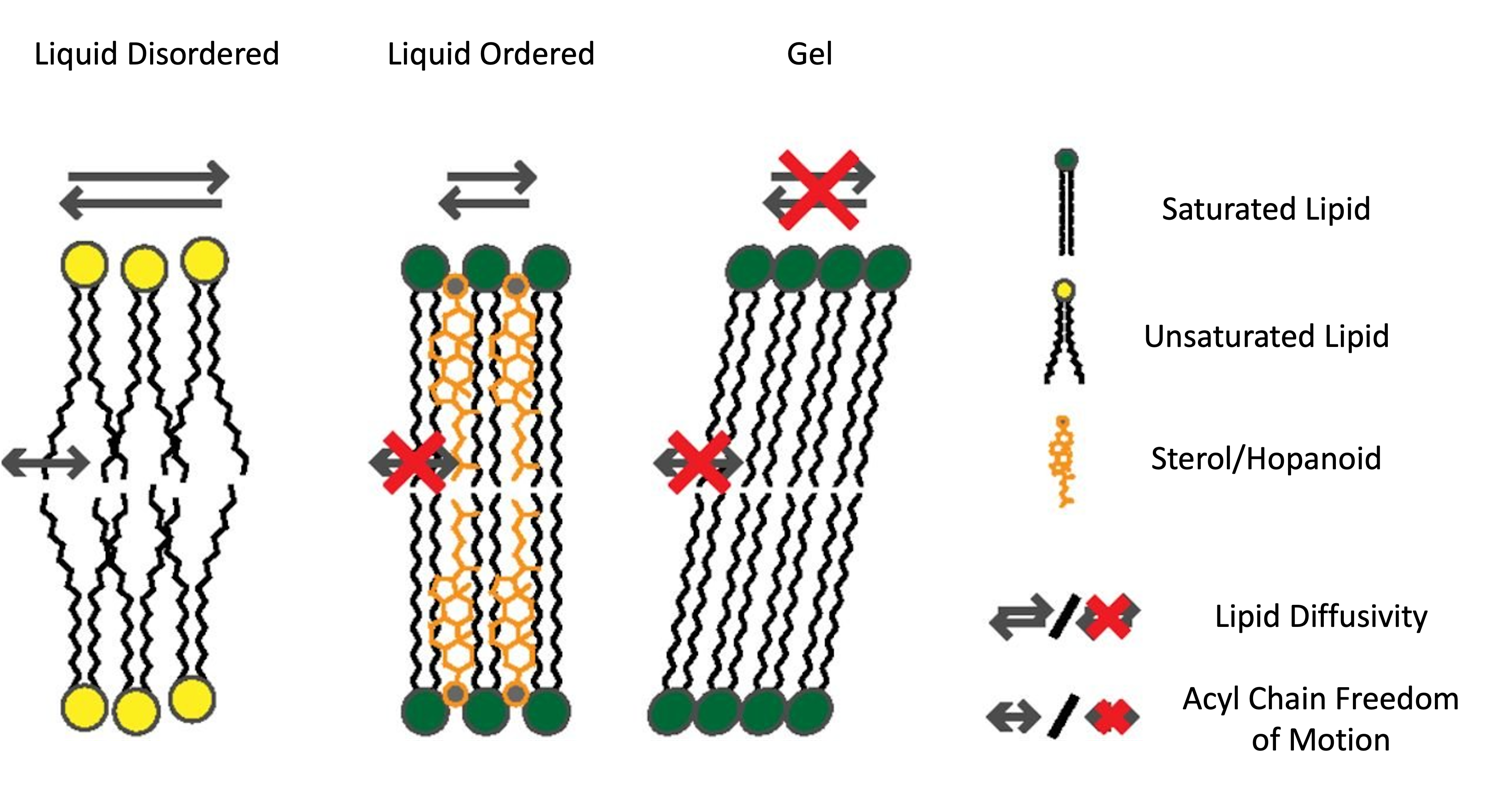
Role of hopanoids and sterols in modulating membrane fluidity. Figure modified from Simons et al. 2012, PNAS 109 (35) 14236–14240.

== Analytical methods ==
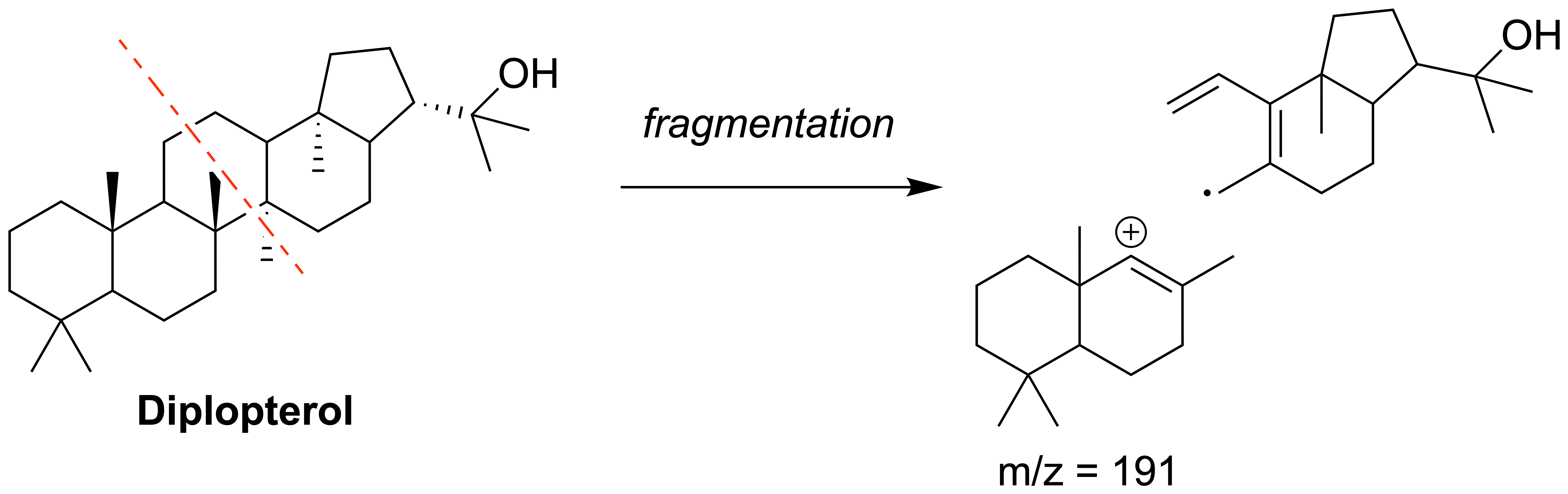
Proposed MS fragmentation pattern for diplopterol.

Some of the most useful techniques for analysis of diplopterol are gas chromatography-mass spectrometry (GC-MS), and GC-MS-MS. These techniques allow for the identification of compounds based on the mass to charge ratios (m/z) of their ions. Whereas many polyfunctionalized hopanes can only be analyzed by liquid chromatography-mass spectrometry (LC-MS), diplopterol and similar compounds with short side chains are fairly easily volatilized. In general, hopanes display a key spectral fragment with m/z 191, corresponding to cleavage across the central C ring. In the case of diplopterol, the alcohol group is often derivatized, either to a trimethylsilyl (TMS) or acetate group. If purification is necessary, diplopterol can typically be separated from other biomarkers by polarity via column chromatography or preparatory thin-layer chromatography (TLC).

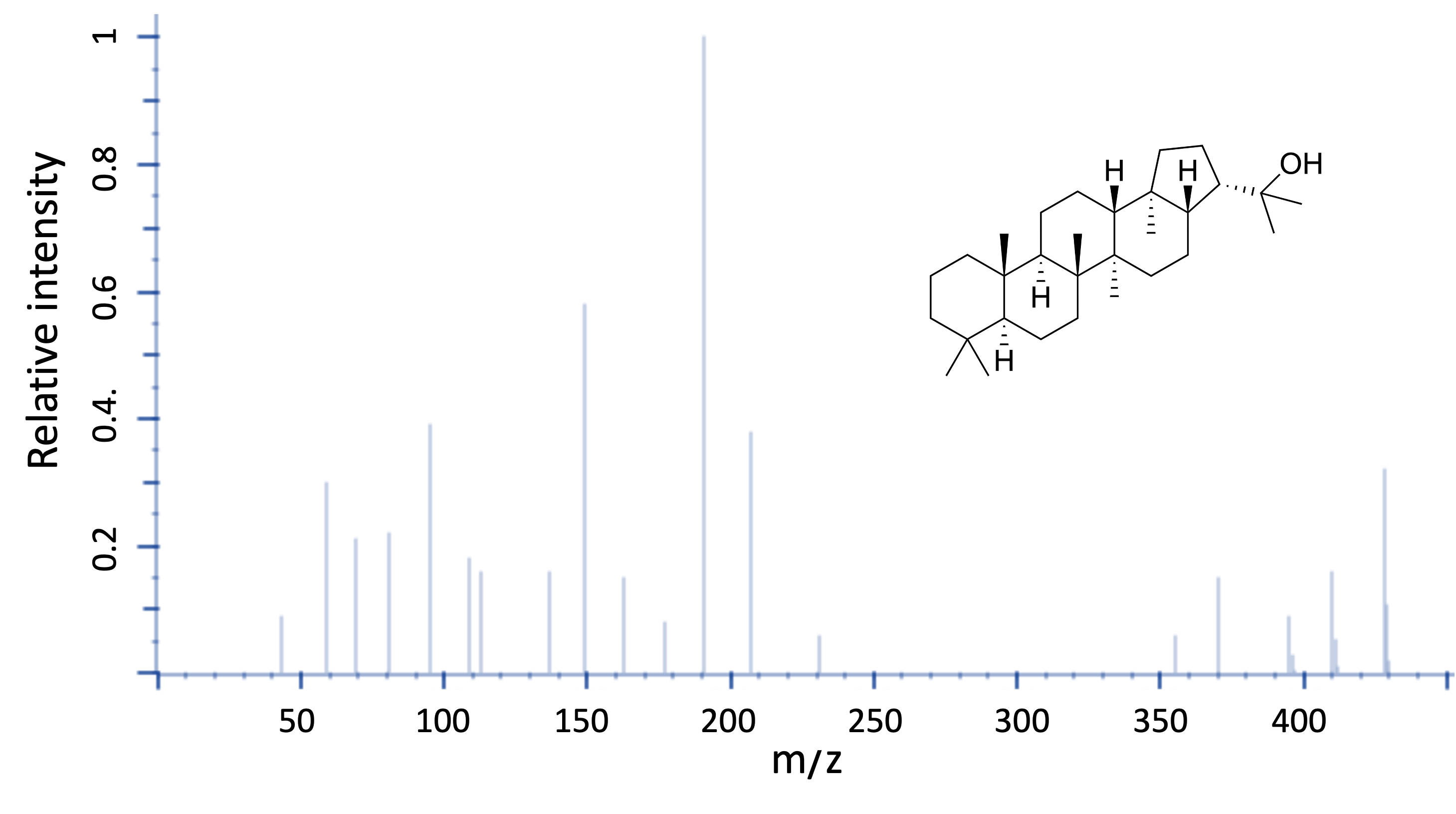
Mass spectrum of diplopterol (modified from Wiley SpectraBase).

A positive identification is often obtained by comparison with extracts from known bacterial producers of diplopterol, such as Methylococcus capsulatus. A literature mass spectrum for diplopterol is shown, along with a figure from a recent report which examines several hopanoid biomarkers in lipid extracts from Rhodopseudomonas palustris.

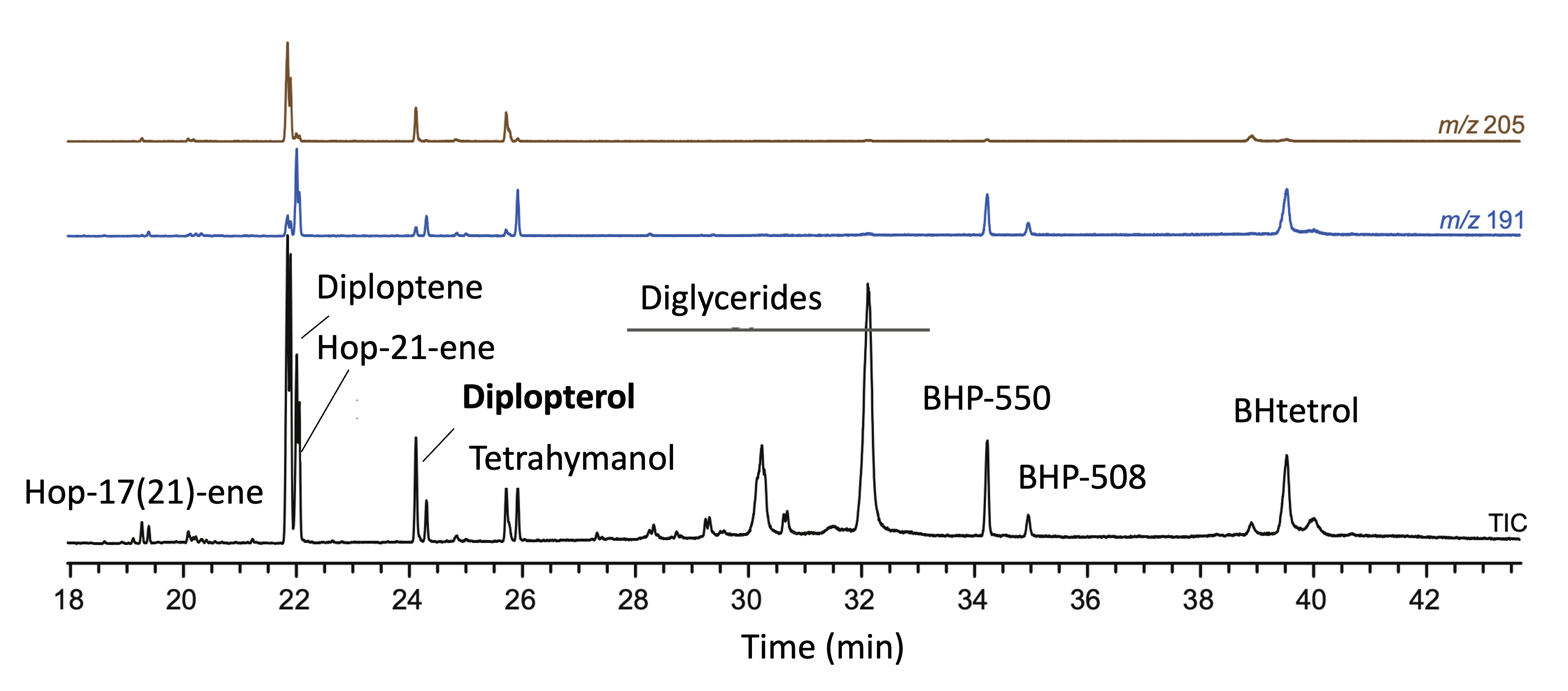
Representative GC-MS chromatogram from bacterial total lipid extract of R. palustris. Modified figure from Sessions et al. Org. Geochem. 56 (2013) 120–130.

== Role as biomarker ==
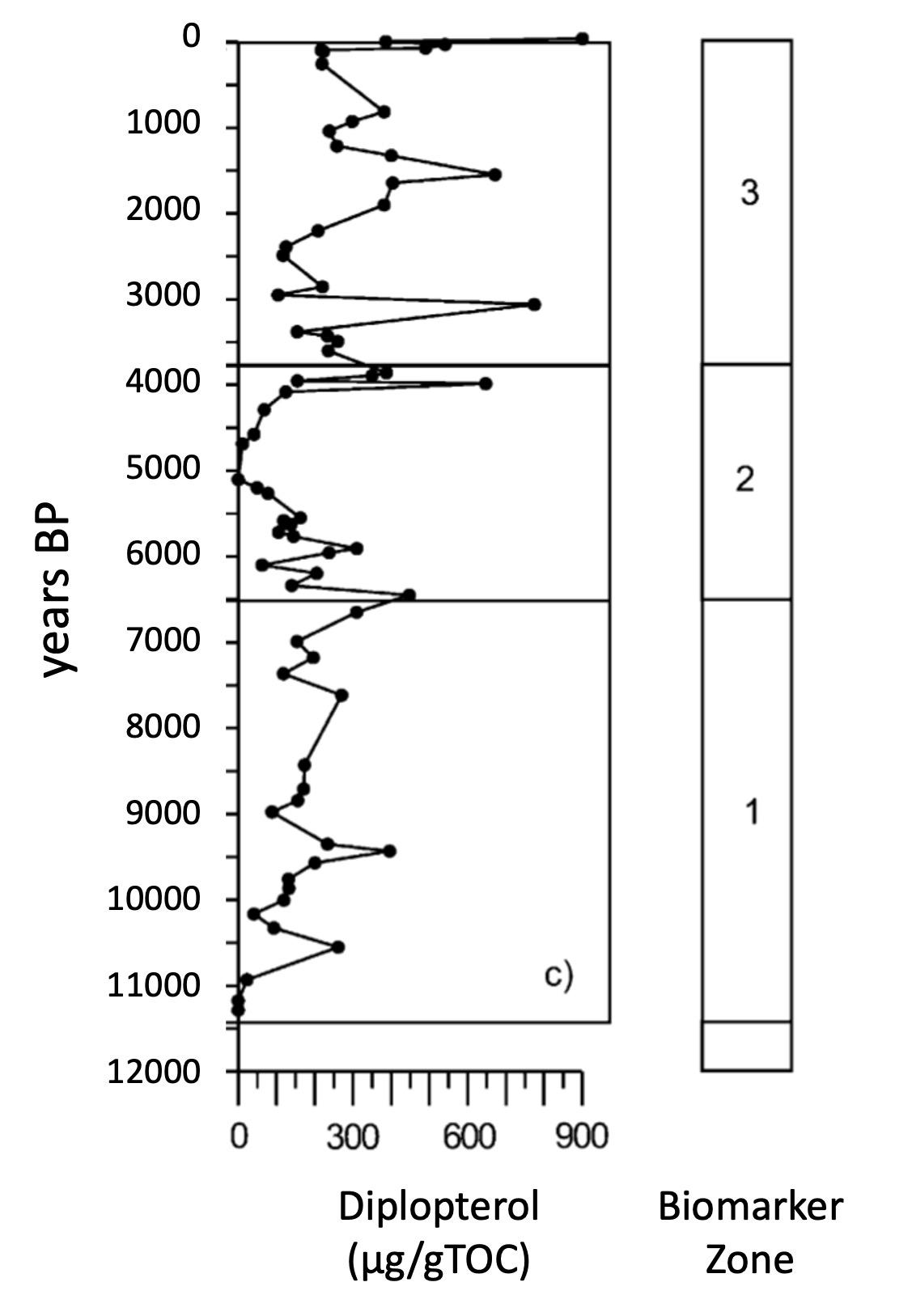
Concentration of diplopterol in Lake Albano, central Italy. Figure modified from S. Hanisch et al. Org. Geochem. 34 (2003) 1223–1235.

Lipid compounds like hopanoids serve as extremely useful biomarkers for ancient life as they are both diverse and extremely well preserved in sedimentary rocks. Because diplopterol is so widespread in bacteria, it is not particularly useful for identification of specific organisms in a given sample. However it is quite useful for determining the relative oxygen content of a region at the time of deposition. For example, diplopterol has been used to examine methane oxidation in sediments because it is produced by aerobic methanotrophic bacteria.The property which is most often used to characterize diplopterol in sediments is the ^{13}C depletion, denoted as δ^{13}C. This isotopic signature is impacted by a variety of factors including burial rates, nutrients, and metabolism. For example, diplopterol δ^{13}C values have been used to determine both the oxygenic conditions of diplopterol biosynthesis and temperatures during sediment deposition.

In addition to diplopterol itself, certain structural analogs of this compound also serve as key biomarkers. 2-methyl analogs of diplopterol are some of the most abundant 2-methylhopanoids. These C_{31} compounds are typically produced by photosynthetic cyanobacteria, along with some methylotrophic and nitrifying bacteria. Such 2-methyl diplopteroids have higher preservation potential than standard diplopterol, and are thus present in highly mature sediments.

=== Case study: Lake Albano, central Italy ===
A recent report in which diplopterol was utilized as a key biomarker examines the lipid composition in sediments from Lake Albano, central Italy. The authors propose that the relative distribution of diplopterol and diploptene provides valuable insight into the oxygen content in the water column during different periods in the Holocene. The authors report a relatively high concentration of diplopterol in the young Holocene. They suggest that since other hopanoids are present in almost all bacteria, whereas diplopterol is also produced by some protozoa, periods of high diplopterol abundance likely indicate lower oxygen contents.
