= Protostane =

Chemical compound

Names
- IUPAC name Protostane
- Systematic IUPAC name (1R,3aS,3bS,5aS,9aS,9bS,11aS)-3a,3b,6,6,9a-Pentamethyl-1-[(2R)-6-methylheptan-2-yl]hexadecahydro-1H-cyclopenta[a]phenanthrene

Identifiers
CAS Number	70050-78-1
3D model (JSmol)	Interactive image
ChEBI	CHEBI:36483
ChemSpider	7827639
PubChem CID	9548716
UNII	7F8LXZ75AX
CompTox Dashboard (EPA)	DTXSID601337032
- InChI: InChI=1S/C30H54/c1-21(2)11-9-12-22(3)23-15-19-29(7)24(23)13-14-26-28(6)18-10-17-27(4,5)25(28)16-20-30(26,29)8/h21-26H,9-20H2,1-8H3/t22-,23-,24+,25+,26+,28+,29+,30+/m1/s1 Key: OORMXZNMRWBSTK-XJIBWFFZSA-N
- SMILES: C[C@H](CCCC(C)C)[C@H]1CC[C@]2([C@H]1CC[C@@H]3[C@@]2(CC[C@@H]4[C@@]3(CCCC4(C)C)C)C)C

Properties
Chemical formula	C_{30}H_{54}
Molar mass	414.762 g·mol^{−1}
- Except where otherwise noted, data are given for materials in their standard state (at 25 °C [77 °F], 100 kPa). Infobox references

Protostane is a tetracyclic triterpene, its natural distribution is primarily limited to the genus Alisma. It is so named because it is considered to be the "prototype" of steroids.

== See also ==
- Fusidane
- Dammarane
- Lanostane
