= Helvolic acid =

Names
- IUPAC name (2Z)-2-[(4S,5S,6S,8S,9S,10R,13R,14S,16S)-6,16-diacetyloxy-4,8,10,14-tetramethyl-3,7-dioxo-5,6,9,11,12,13,15,16-octahydro-4H-cyclopenta[a]phenanthren-17-ylidene]-6-methylhept-5-enoic acid
- Other names Fumigacin

Identifiers
CAS Number	29400-42-8
3D model (JSmol)	Interactive image
ChEBI	CHEBI:62460
ChEMBL	ChEMBL505132
ChemSpider	2273343
PubChem CID	3002143
UNII	MZX54GS8AH
CompTox Dashboard (EPA)	DTXSID201017874
- InChI: InChI=1S/C33H44O8/c1-17(2)10-9-11-21(30(38)39)26-22-12-13-25-31(6)15-14-23(36)18(3)27(31)28(41-20(5)35)29(37)33(25,8)32(22,7)16-24(26)40-19(4)34/h10,14-15,18,22,24-25,27-28H,9,11-13,16H2,1-8H3,(H,38,39)/b26-21-/t18-,22+,24+,25+,27-,28+,31-,32+,33-/m1/s1 Key: MDFZYGLOIJNNRM-OAJDADRGSA-N
- SMILES: CC1C2C(C(=O)C3(C(C2(C=CC1=O)C)CCC4C3(CC(C4=C(CCC=C(C)C)C(=O)O)OC(=O)C)C)C)OC(=O)C

Properties
Chemical formula	C_{33}H_{44}O_{8}
Molar mass	568.707 g·mol^{−1}
Appearance	crystalline solid
Density	1.2 g/cm³
Boiling point	675.9
Solubility in water	slightly soluble
- Except where otherwise noted, data are given for materials in their standard state (at 25 °C [77 °F], 100 kPa). (what is ?) Infobox references

Helvolic acid is a steroidal antibiotic compound classified as a fusidane-type nortriterpenoid. It is a tetracyclic steroid acid characterized by a 29-nordammarane skeleton, which is substituted with acetoxy groups at positions C-6 and C-16, oxo groups at C-3 and C-7, and double bonds at C-1, C-17(20), and C-24. Its molecular formula is C_{33}H_{44}O_{8}.

== Natural occurrence ==
The acid is produced by various fungi, notably Aspergillus species such as Aspergillus fumigatus and Aspergillus terreus, as well as members of the genus Fusarium and Xylaria. The acid was originally isolated from Aspergillus fumigatus.

Helvolic acid was isolated from the culture broth which was separated from the fungus mycelium by filtration.
