= Sterane =

Class of tetracyclic compounds derived from steroids

Numbering of the carbon atoms. In steranes, the side chain at C-17 varies.

Steranes constitute a group of alkane organic compounds with a cyclopentane-fused hydrogenated phenanthrene structure as the parent nucleus, and they derived from steroids or sterols via diagenetic and catagenetic degradation, such as hydrogenation. They are found in sediments and sedimentary rocks in nature. Steranes are derivatives of gonane, the steroid nucleus which is also called "cyclopentanoperhydrophenanthrene". They have an androstane skeleton with a side chain at the C-17 carbon, constituting the scaffold of all sterols. Steranes are widely used as biomarkers for the presence of eukaryotes in past ecosystems because steroids are nearly exclusively produced by eukaryotes. In particular, cholestanes are diagenetic products of cholesterol in animals, while stigmastanes are diagenetic products of stigmasterols in algae and land plants. However, some bacteria are now known to produce sterols and it is inferred that the ultimate origin of sterol biosynthesis is in bacteria. Sterols are produced via protosterols that are direct cyclization compounds of squalene by the catalysis of oxidosqualene cyclase. All known sterols in eukaryotes are enzymatically extensively modified from protosterols, while organisms that only produce protosterols are not known. The oldest record of modified steranes are in sedimentary rocks deposited ca. 720–820 million years ago. In contrast, diagenetic products of protosterols (called protostanes and cyclosteranes) are widely distributed in older Proterozoic rocks and imply the presence of extinct proto-eukaryotes and/or sterol-producing bacteria before the evolution of crown-group eukaryotes.

Steranes may be rearranged to diasteranes during diagenesis (C-27 to C-30, rearrangement at C-18 and C-19, no R at C-24). Oils from clastic source rocks tend to be rich in diasteranes.

Cholesterol and its derivatives (such as progesterone, aldosterone, cortisol, and testosterone), are common examples of compounds with the sterane scaffold.

== See also ==
- Cholestane
