= Cholestane =

- IUPAC numbering

Names
- IUPAC name Cholestane
- Systematic IUPAC name (1R,3aS,3bR,9aS,9bS,11aR)-9a,11a-Dimethyl-1-[(2R)-6-methylheptan-2-yl]hexadecahydro-1H-cyclopenta[a]phenanthrene

Identifiers
CAS Number	14982-53-7 5α/β; 481-21-0 5α; 481-20-9 5β
3D model (JSmol)	Interactive image; Interactive image
ChEBI	CHEBI:35516
ChemSpider	5256870
ECHA InfoCard	100.035.496
IUPHAR/BPS	2802
PubChem CID	6857534
UNII	U260HWN305 (5α)
CompTox Dashboard (EPA)	DTXSID701357332 DTXSID20880725, DTXSID701357332
- InChI: InChI=1S/C27H48/c1-19(2)9-8-10-20(3)23-14-15-24-22-13-12-21-11-6-7-17-26(21,4)25(22)16-18-27(23,24)5/h19-25H,6-18H2,1-5H3/t20-,21?,22+,23-,24+,25+,26+,27-/m1/s1 Key: XIIAYQZJNBULGD-LDHZKLTISA-N; InChI=1/C27H48/c1-19(2)9-8-10-20(3)23-14-15-24-22-13-12-21-11-6-7-17-26(21,4)25(22)16-18-27(23,24)5/h19-25H,6-18H2,1-5H3/t20-,21?,22+,23-,24+,25+,26+,27-/m1/s1 Key: XIIAYQZJNBULGD-LDHZKLTIBN
- SMILES: C[C@H](CCCC(C)C)[C@H]1CC[C@@H]2[C@@]1(CC[C@H]3[C@H]2CCC4[C@@]3(CCCC4)C)C; C41CCCC[C@@]1([C@@H]3[C@H]([C@@H]2CC[C@@H]([C@@]2(C)CC3)[C@H](C)CCCC(C)C)CC4)C

Properties
Chemical formula	C_{27}H_{48}
Molar mass	372.681 g·mol^{−1}
Density	0.911 g/ml
- Except where otherwise noted, data are given for materials in their standard state (at 25 °C [77 °F], 100 kPa). verify (what is ?) Infobox references

Cholestane is a saturated tetracyclic steroid biosynthetically derived from triterpenoids. This 27-carbon biomarker is produced by diagenesis of cholesterol and is one of the most abundant biomarkers in the rock record. Presence of cholestane, its derivatives and related chemical compounds in environmental samples is commonly interpreted as an indicator of animal life and/or traces of O_{2}, as animals are known for exclusively producing cholesterol, and thus has been used to draw evolutionary relationships between ancient organisms of unknown phylogenetic origin and modern metazoan taxa. Cholesterol is made in low abundance by other organisms (e.g., rhodophytes, land plants), but because these other organisms produce a variety of sterols it cannot be used as a conclusive indicator of any one taxon. It is often found in analysis of organic compounds in petroleum.

== Background ==
Cholestane is a saturated C-27 animal biomarker often found in petroleum deposits. It is a diagenetic product of cholesterol, which is an organic molecule made primarily by animals and make up ~30% of animal cell membranes. Cholesterol is responsible for membrane rigidity and fluidity, as well as intracellular transport, cell signaling and nerve conduction. In humans, it is also the precursor for hormones (i.e., estrogen, testosterone). It is synthesized via squalene and naturally assumes a specific stereochemical orientation (3β-ol, 5α (H), 14α (H), 17α (H), 20R). This stereochemical orientation is typically maintained throughout diagenetic processes, but cholestane can be found in the fossil record with many stereochemical configurations.

=== Biomarker ===
Cholestane in the fossil record is often interpreted as an indicator (biomarker) of ancient animal life and is often used by geochemists and geobiologists to reconstruct animal evolution (particularly in the Precambrian Earth history; e.g., Ediacaran, Cryogenian and Proterozoic in general). Molecular oxygen is required to produce cholesterol; thus, the presence of cholestane suggests some trace of oxygen in the paleoenvironment. Cholestane is not exclusively derived from diagenesis of animal-derived steroid molecules; cholestane may also be associated with the presence of e.g., rhodophytes and embryophytes, although the abundance of such non-metaozan cholestane is unknown. Embryophytes generally produce a variety of sterols, which are collectively known as phytosterols, and cholesterol remains a minor component. In contrast, bacteria produce other cyclic triterpenoids such as hopanoids and their diagenetic products hopanes are utilized as bacterial biomarkers.

== Natural preservation in fossils ==
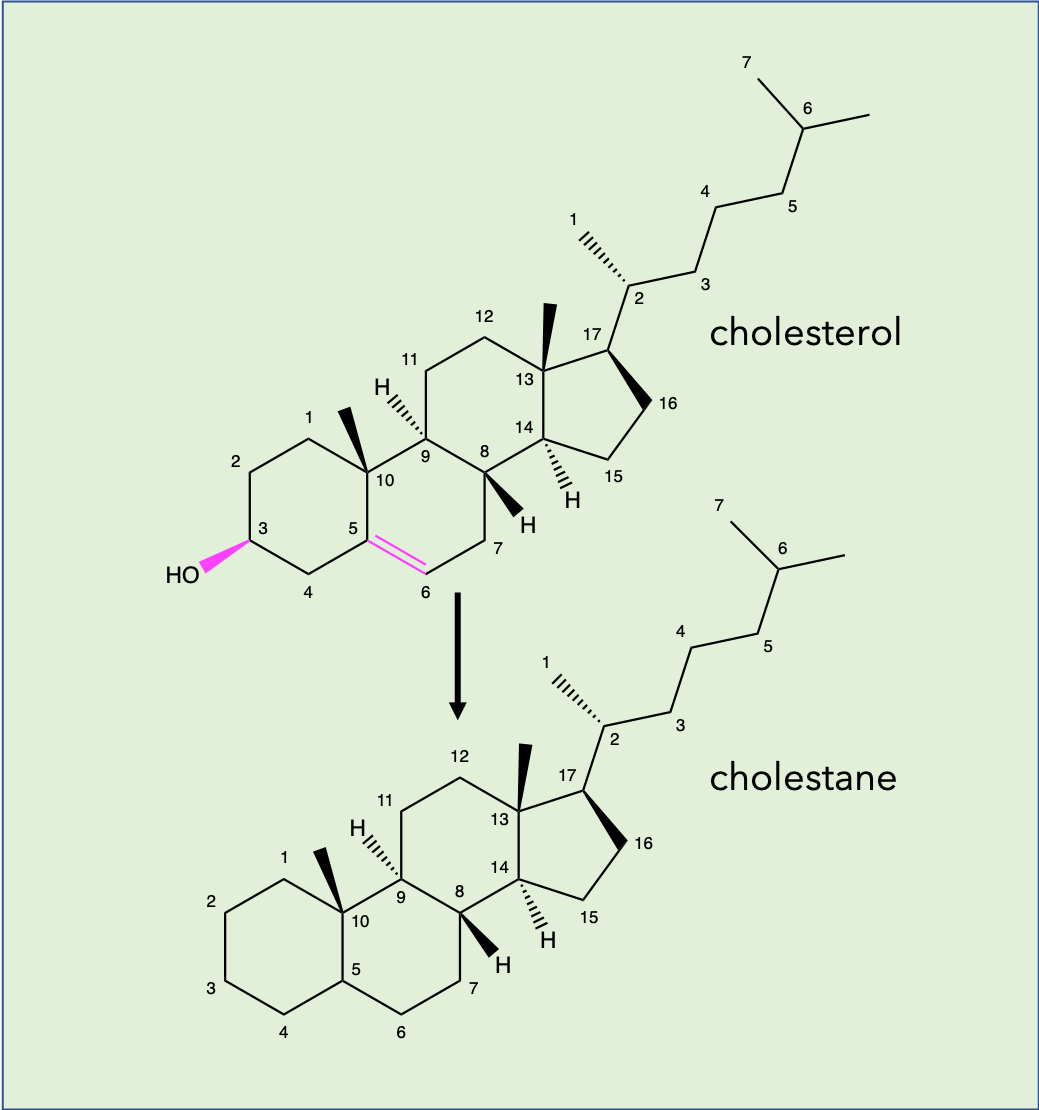
Cholesterol degrades to cholestane by loss of OH functional group and saturation of double bond (indicated in pink). Stereochemistry of the molecule is maintained in this degradation.

Cholesterol has 256 stereoisomers, but only one of them is formed naturally in production of cholesterol (3β-ol, 5α (H), 14α (H), 17α (H), 20R) and is therefore the primary stereoisomer of interest for cholestane measurements. Deviations from this stereochemistry often reflects diagenesis, thermal maturation and preservation bias.

Diagenesis typically leads to the loss of functional groups and double bonds in organic molecules. For cholestane specifically, diagenesis of cholesterol to cholestane produces a molecule that is fully saturated compared to its steroid counterpart. This process occurs without the loss or gain of carbon atoms and therefore can serve as an indicator of the original steroid produced by the organism in the environment.

Thermal alteration can also cause loss of the alkane side-chain at C_{17}. An experiment demonstrated that over 4 weeks at 300 °C, cholestane underwent 17% decomposition of its alkane side chain. In contrast, the polycyclic structure (C_{1-17}) is very thermally stable. Diagenetic processes can also cause methyl shifts and aromatization.

=== Stereochemical alteration ===
Additional diagenetic processes can further alter the cholestane molecule. For instance, cholestane is susceptible to stereochemical shifts over time from its natural isomer. These changes can be the effect of thermal or microbial alteration. Thermal alteration can cause changes in stereochemistry at both the C_{20} chiral center, as well as the hydrogen atoms. The ratio of R/S stereoisomers is typically reported as a measure of "thermal maturity". In contrast, conversion of the hydrogen atom at the C_{5} position from α to β configuration reflects anaerobic microbial activity, and can be understood through isotope labeling experiments on controlled microbe experiments metabolizing the steroid of interest. One study demonstrated that there are two reactions that can produce loss of the cholesterol double bond—(1) direct reduction of double bond or (2) production of ketone prior to reduction of double bond—resulting in distinct isomerization of the hydrogen atom at the C_{5} position. The C14 and C17α hydrogen atoms are more stable and undergo changes to β configuration in much lower abundances than the 5 hydrogen atom.

== Measurement techniques ==
=== GC/MS ===
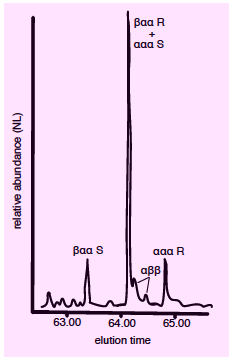
Cholestane isomers elute at different times in GC/MS/MS experiments in the m/z 372→217 fragment. Figure adapted from Bobrovskiy et al.

Cholestane can be extracted from samples and measured on the GC/MS to quantify relative abundance to other organic compounds. This measurement is done by extraction of the steranes into a non-polar solvent (e.g., dichloromethane or chloroform) and purified into a "saturates" fraction using silica gel column gas chromatography. Cholestane isomers will elute from the column based on molecular weight and various stereochemistry, which makes traditional mass spectrometry challenging due to close co-elution of isomers. Alternatively, one can measure cholestane using GC/MS/MS experiments which target the m/z fragment 217 (from molecular ion 372). This specific method first looks for the 372 molecular ion of cholestane, and then fragments that molecular ion further to its m/z 217 fragment in order to improve identification of specific isomers.

=== δ^{13}C isotope ratios ===
δ^{13}C values of cholestane reflect the carbon isotope composition of the animals that created the original cholesterol molecules. Animal carbon isotope composition is typically understood to be a function of their diet; therefore, carbon isotope composition of cholestane would reflect this original diet value as well. δ^{13}C values can be measured using a gas chromatograph coupled to an IRMS.

More generally, steranes can be used as an indicator of environmental shifts. A study has presented δ^{13}C values of steranes versus hopanes and used it to propose changes in the photic zone over the course of the Miocene, as changes in the isotope value must be either a result of dissolved inorganic carbon within the water or biological isotope fractionation.

== Case studies ==
=== Early life biomarkers ===
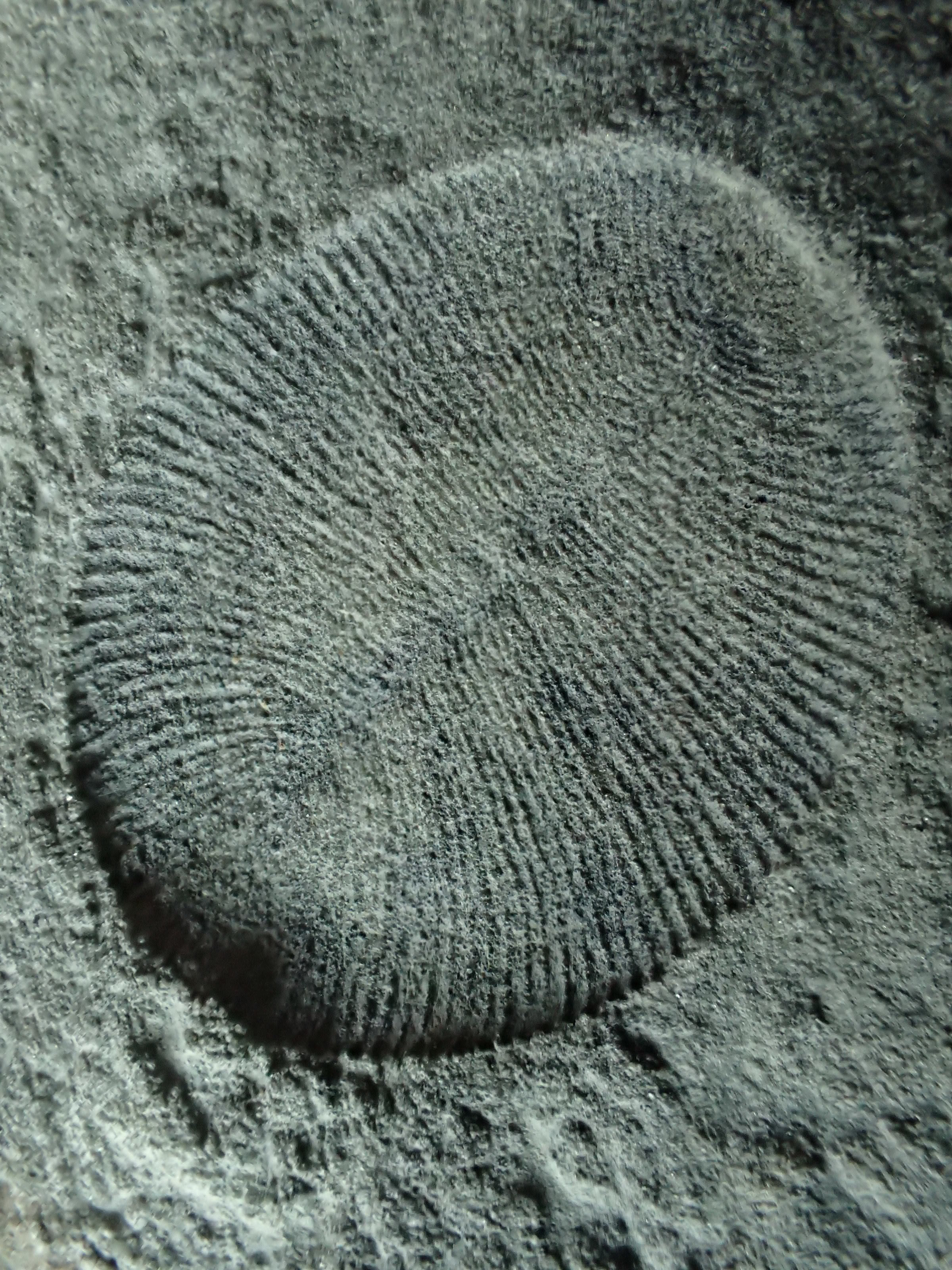
Dickinsonia fossil was proved to be ancient animal via cholestane biomarker identification.

Presence of cholestane does not necessarily indicate presence of animals, but is often used in conjunction with other biomarkers to note the rise of distinct taxa in the fossil record; with regard to this, a study measured relative abundance in cholestane versus other triterpenoid biomarkers to demonstrate the rise of algae during the Neoproterozoic.

Tracing the actual origins of cholestane within the fossil record is challenging, as most of the rocks from that time period are heavily metamorphosed and thus potential biomarkers are thermally altered. A study linked the source of cholestane to a specific Ediacaran fossil (Dickinsonia) to provide constraints to the taxonomic classification of Ediacaran biota as evolutionary preludes to metazoan life. Cholestane is not a specific marker for animals though and is found in most eukaryotic lineages.

== See also ==
- Sterane
