= Sapogenin =

The chemical structure of yamogenin, a sapogenin found in fenugreek

Sapogenins are aglycones (non-saccharide moieties) of saponins, a large family of natural products. Sapogenins contain steroid or other triterpene frameworks as their key organic feature. Some steroidal sapogenins can serve as a practical starting point for the semisynthesis of particular steroid hormones.

== Steroid sapogenins ==
The Spirostanols are Listed alphabetically:
Agapanthagenin, Agavogenin, Andesgenin, Australigenin, Bethogenin, Cacogenin, Cepagenin, Chiapagenin, Chlorogenin, Cholegenin, cologenin, Convallagenin-A, Convallagenin-B, Convallamarogenin, Correllogenin, 9-dehydromanogenin, dihydrokryptogenin, Digalogenin, Digitogenin, Diosgenin, Diotigenin, Epiruscogenin, Epitigogenin, Gentrogenin (botogenin), Gitogenin, Hecogenin, Heloniogenin, Hispidogenin, Isochiapagenin, Isocholegenin, Isorhodeasapogenin, Isokammogenin, Isonarthogenin, Isonuatigenin, Isorhodeasapogenin, Jimogenin, Kammogenin, Kogagenin, Kitigenin, Laxogenin, Lilagenin, Lubigenin, Isonuatigenin, Lilagenin, Magogenin, Manogenin, Markogenin, Metagenin, Mexogenin, Namogenin B, Narthogenin, Neobotogenin, Neochlorogenin, Neodigalogenin, Neodigitogenin,Neogitogenin, Neohecogenin, Neokammogenin, Neomanogenin, Neonogiragenin, Neomexogenin, Neoruscogenin, Neotigogenin, Nogiragenin, Nuatigenin, Pennogenin, Pentologenin, Prazerigenin A, Rhodeasapogenin, Ricogenin, Rockogenin, Ruscogenin, Samogenin, Sisalagenin, Sarsasapogenin, Solagenin, Smilagenin, Spirostanol, Spirotaccagenin, Tamusgenin, Texogenin, Tigogenin, Tokorogenin, Willagenin, Yamogenin, Yonogenin & Yuccagenin.

Some alkaloidal spirostanols that are classed as spirosolans include: solasodine, tomatidine

Other examples of steroidal sapogenins include: diosgenone, Penupogenin & Qingyangshengenin & Smilagenone.

Selected furostanols: Prototigogenin, Protoneotigogenin, Protodiosgenin, Protogitogenin, Protoneogitogenin.

== Other Triterpenoid sapogenins ==
Triterpenoid sapogenins might be even be more complicated to understand than the steroidal sapogenins listed above. They can be grouped according to their skeleton type:

1. Oleanane-type, e.g. oleanolic acid, hederagenin, gypsogenin, bayogenin, echinocystic acid, maslinic acid, arjunolic acid, & momordin aglycones.
2. Ursane-type, e.g. Ursolic acid, Asiatic acid, Corosolic acid, Pomolic acid, Rotungenic acid & Madecassic acid.
3. Lupane-type, e.g. Lupeol, Betulin, Betulinic acid & Betulonic acid.
4. Dammarane-type, e.g Protopanaxadiol, Protopanaxatriol, Dammarendiol, Dammarenediol‑II, & Ocotillol‑type aglycones.
5. Lanostane-type, e.g. Lanosterol, Cycloartenol, Parkeol, Schiglauzic acid, Ganoderic acids (from Ganoderma), & Lucidenic acids.
6. Hopane-type, e.g. Hopane, Diploptene & Moretenol.
7. Cucurbitane-type, e.g. Cucurbitacin B, Cucurbitacin E & Cucurbitacin R.
8. Tirucallane/Euphane-type, e.g. Tirucallol, Euphol & Dammaradienol.
9. Friedelane-type, e.g. Friedelin, Friedelan‑3‑one, & Epifriedelanol.
10. Onocerane-type, e.g. Onoceranone & Onocerol.
11. Quassinoid-type, e.g. Bruceanol A, Eurycomanone & Quassin.
12. Cycloartane-type, e.g. Cycloastragenol & Astragenol.
13. Holostane-type, e.g. Holostane aglycones & Echinosides (aglycones)
14. and more unusually Onoceranes, Tetranortriterpenoids & Limonoids.

Unsorted list of examples: caulophyllogenin, cryptogenin, medicagenic acid, , soyasapogenol a, soyasapogenol b, soyasapogenol e, zanhic acid.
