= C30H50O =

The molecular formula C_{30}H_{50}O may refer to:

- Amyrins, a class of triterpene
- Achilleol A
- Achilleol B
- Camelliol C
- Citrostadienol
- Cycloartenol, a sterol precursor in photosynthetic organisms and plants
- Cycloeucalenol, a pentacyclic triterpenoid
- Euphol
- Friedelin, a triterpene
- Isoarborinol
- Lanosterol, a tetracyclic triterpenoid
- Lupeol
- Obtusifoliol
- 2,3-Oxidosqualene
- Parkeol
- Taraxasterol
- Taraxerol
- Tirucallol
