= Dihydrolanosterol =

Names
- IUPAC name Lanost-8-en-3β-ol
- Systematic IUPAC name (1R,3aR,5aR,7S,9aS,11aR)-3a,6,6,9a,11a-Pentamethyl-1-[(2R)-6-methylheptan-2-yl]-2,3,3a,4,5,5a,6,7,8,9,9a,10,11,11a-tetradecahydro-1H-cyclopenta[a]phenanthren-7-ol
- Other names Lanostenol, (3β)-Lanost-8-en-3-ol

Identifiers
CAS Number	79-62-9
3D model (JSmol)	Interactive image
ChEBI	CHEBI:28113
ChemSpider	389460
PubChem CID	440560
UNII	9H273A8B2X
CompTox Dashboard (EPA)	DTXSID101000181
- InChI: InChI=1S/C30H52O/c1-20(2)10-9-11-21(3)22-14-18-30(8)24-12-13-25-27(4,5)26(31)16-17-28(25,6)23(24)15-19-29(22,30)7/h20-22,25-26,31H,9-19H2,1-8H3/t21-,22-,25+,26+,28-,29-,30+/m1/s1 Key: MBZYKEVPFYHDOH-BQNIITSRSA-N
- SMILES: C[C@H](CCCC(C)C)[C@H]1CC[C@@]2([C@@]1(CCC3=C2CC[C@@H]4[C@@]3(CC[C@@H](C4(C)C)O)C)C)C

Properties
Chemical formula	C_{30}H_{52}O
Molar mass	428.745 g·mol^{−1}
- Except where otherwise noted, data are given for materials in their standard state (at 25 °C [77 °F], 100 kPa). Infobox references

Dihydrolanosterol, or 24,25-Dihydrolanosterol, also called Lanostenol, is a sterol and the C24-25 hydrogenated products of lanosterol, dihydrolanosterol can be demethylated by mammal or yeast cytochrome P450 sterol 14alpha-demethylase.

== See also ==
- Lanosterol
- Obtusifoliol
- Cycloartenol
