= Cycloeucalenol cycloisomerase =

cycloeucalenol cycloisomerase

Identifiers
- EC no.: 5.5.1.9
- CAS no.: 60496-19-7

Databases
- IntEnz: IntEnz view
- BRENDA: BRENDA entry
- ExPASy: NiceZyme view
- KEGG: KEGG entry
- MetaCyc: metabolic pathway
- PRIAM: profile
- PDB structures: RCSB PDB PDBe PDBsum
- Gene Ontology: AmiGO / QuickGO
Search
- PMC: articles
- PubMed: articles
- NCBI: proteins

In enzymology, a cycloeucalenol cycloisomerase (EC 5.5.1.9) is an enzyme that catalyzes the chemical reaction

cycloeucalenol $\rightleftharpoons$ obtusifoliol

Hence, this enzyme has one substrate, cycloeucalenol, and one product, obtusifoliol.

This enzyme belongs to the family of isomerases, specifically the class of intramolecular lyases. The systematic name of this enzyme class is cycloeucalenol lyase (cyclopropane-decyclizing). This enzyme is also called cycloeucalenol---obtusifoliol isomerase. This enzyme participates in biosynthesis of steroids.
