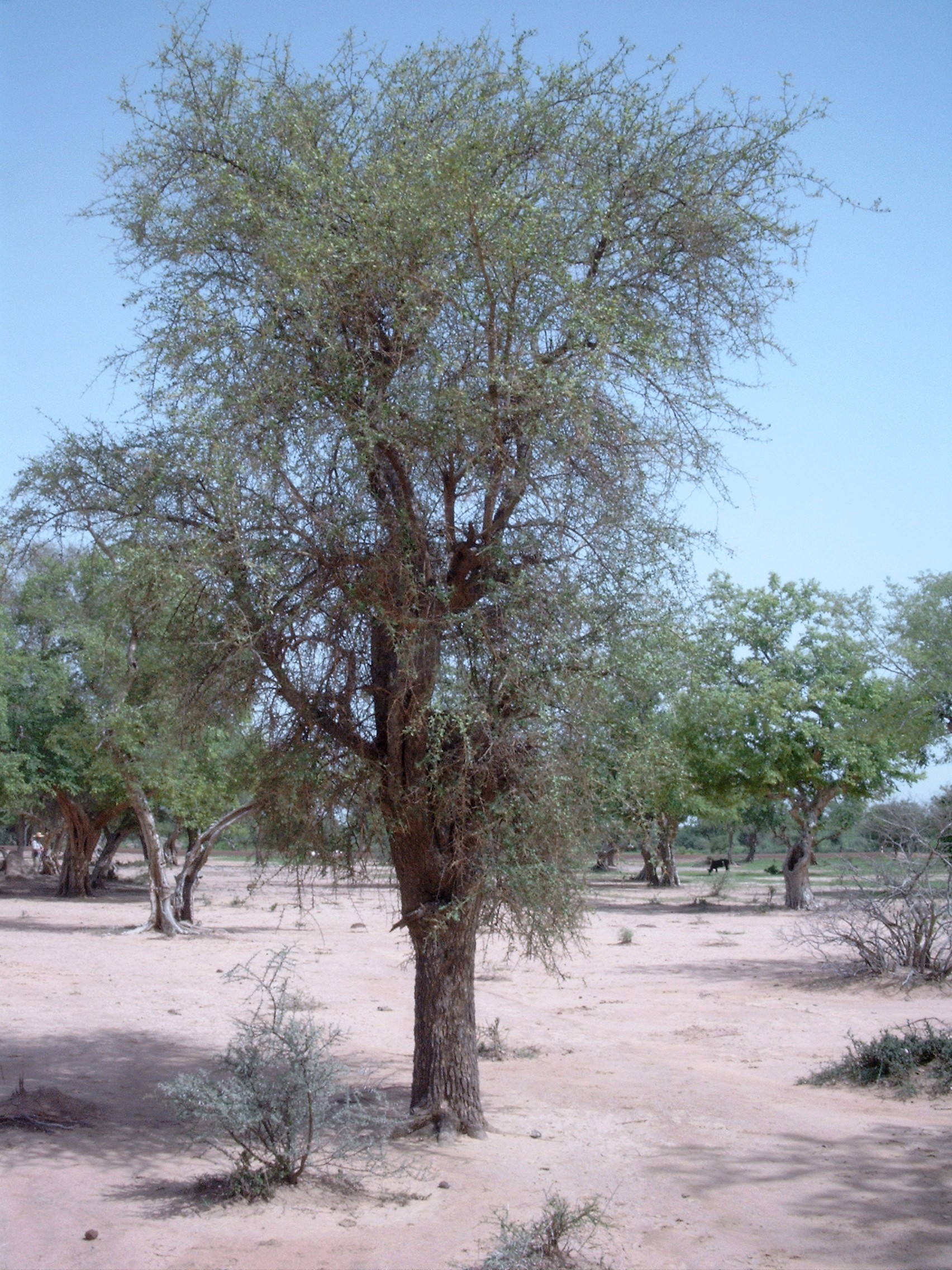

Conservation status
- Least Concern (IUCN 3.1)

Scientific classification
- Kingdom: Plantae
- Clade: Tracheophytes
- Clade: Angiosperms
- Clade: Eudicots
- Clade: Rosids
- Order: Zygophyllales
- Family: Zygophyllaceae
- Genus: Balanites
- Species: B. aegyptiaca

Binomial name
- Balanites aegyptiaca (L.) Delile

Synonyms
- Agialid aegyptiaca (L.) Kuntze; Ximenia aegyptiaca L.

= Balanites aegyptiaca =

Species of tree

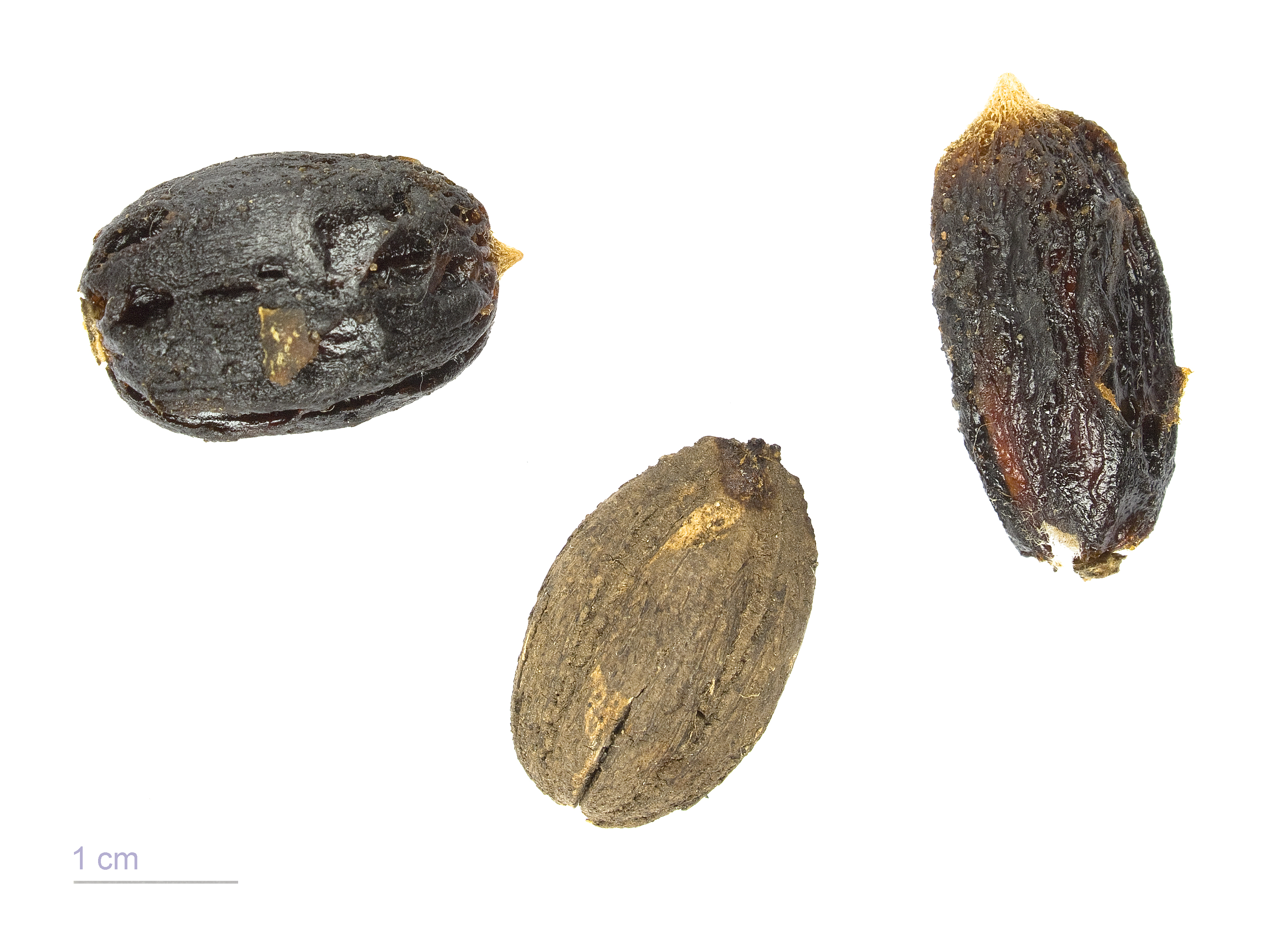
Balanites aegyptiaca - MHNT

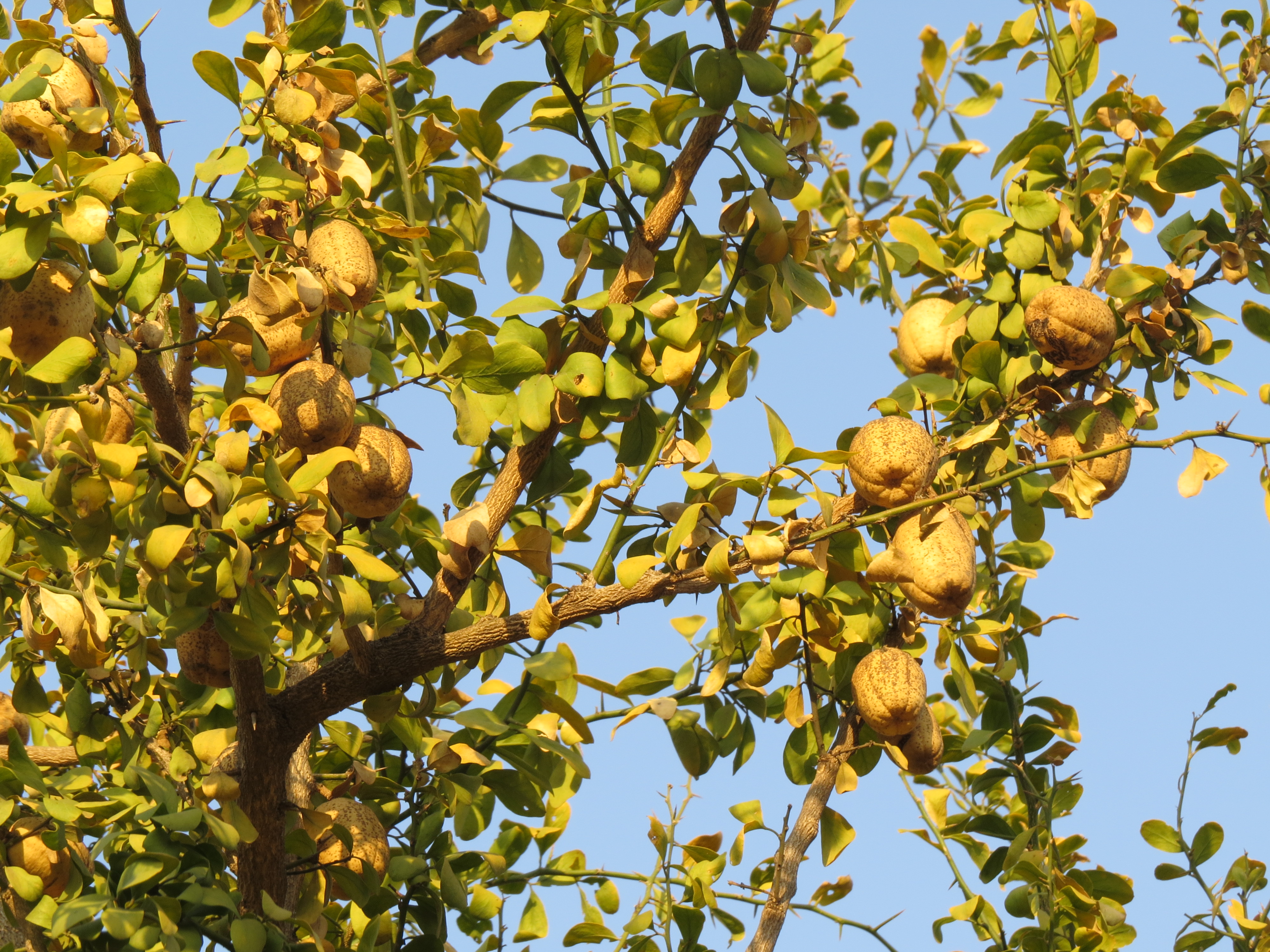
Detail of fruit

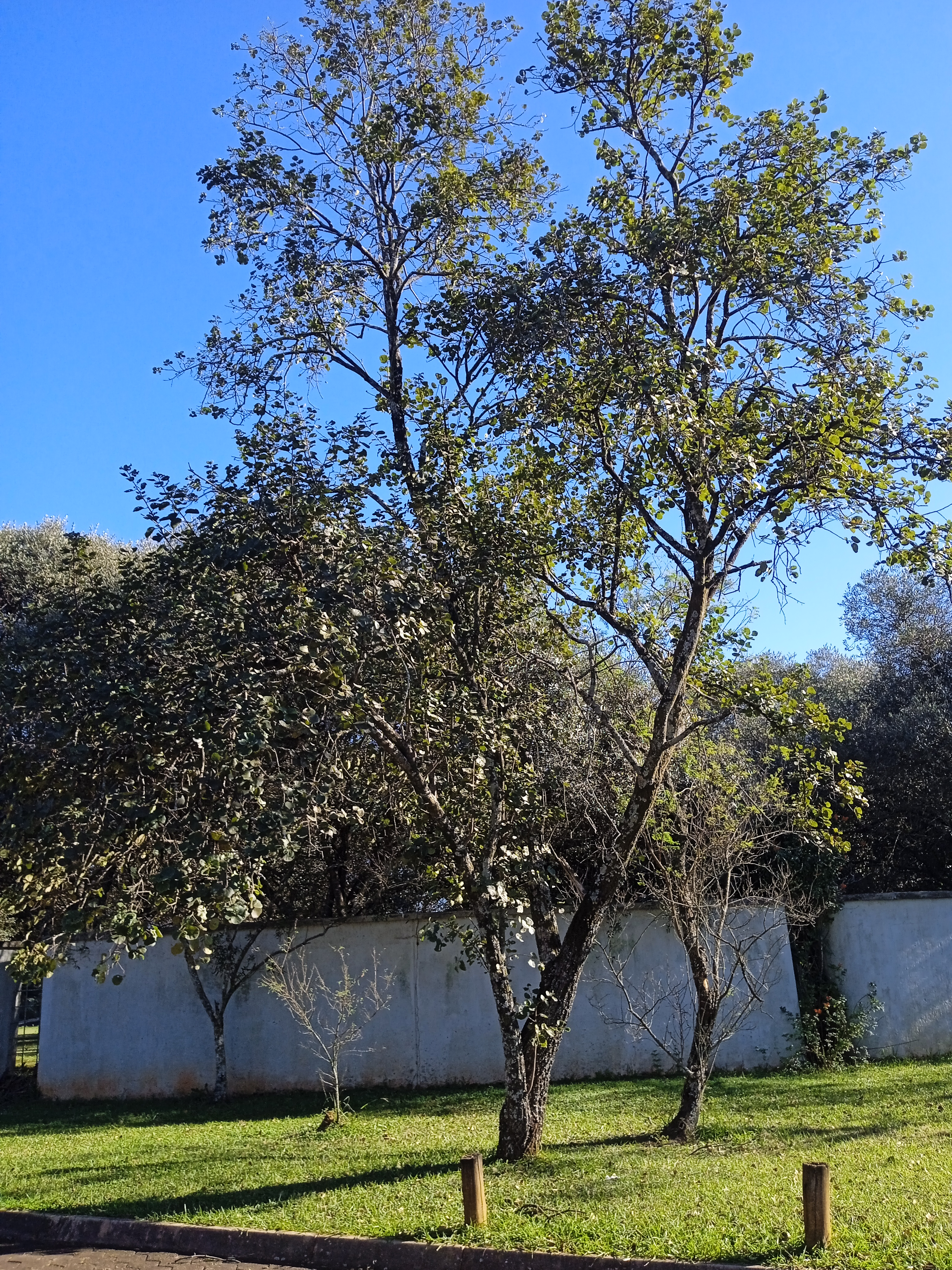

Balanites aegyptiaca (also known as the desert date, Egyptian balsam and lalob in Sudan) is a species of tree, classified as a member of either the Zygophyllaceae or the Balanitaceae. This tree is native to much of Africa (excluding South Africa, Namibia, Madagascar, Senegal and Tunisia) and parts of the Middle East (from Syria south to Yemen). It can be found in many kinds of habitat, tolerating a wide variety of soil types, from sand to heavy clay, and climatic moisture levels, from arid to subhumid. It is relatively tolerant of flooding, livestock activity, and wildfire.

It is an important food tree, with edible leaves and fruits, and has many local uses.

The generic part of the binomial Balanites derives from the Greek word for an acorn and refers to the fruit. This name was coined by Alire Delile in 1813. It replaced the name Agialid, which has its roots in the Arabic name for the tree. In Descr. Egypte, Hist. Nat. 221 1813, the specific name aegyptiaca was applied by Carl Linnaeus as the species was initially described from specimens collected in Egypt. The orthographic variant name that complies with ICBN Art 62.4 for this species is Balanites aegyptiacus.

== Description ==
There are many common names for this plant. In English, the fruit has been called desert date, and the tree soap berry tree or bush, thorn tree, Egyptian myrobalan, Egyptian balsam or Zachum oil tree.

The Balanites aegyptiaca tree reaches 10 m (33 ft) in height with a generally narrow form. The branches have long, straight green spines arranged in spirals. The dark green compound leaves grow out of the base of the spines and are made up of two leaflets which are variable in size and shape. The fluted trunk has grayish-brown, ragged bark with yellow-green patches where it is shed.

The inflorescence consists of bunches of a few flowers which are either sessile or are borne on short stalks. The flower buds are ovoid and covered in a short tomentose pubescence. The individual flowers are greenish-yellow in colour, hermaphroditic with five petals in radial symmetry and are 8–14 millimetres (0.31–0.55 in) in diameter. The pedicel of the inflorescence is greyish in colour, downy and usually less than 10 mm (0.39 in) in length, although 15 mm (0.59 in) has been recorded in Zambia and Zimbabwe.

=== Fruit ===
The ellipsoid fruit is normally less than 4 cm (1.6 in) long and is green when not ripe; it ripens to a brown or pale brown fruit with a crispy skin enclosing a sticky brown or brown-green pulp around a hard stone.

== Uses ==
=== Food ===
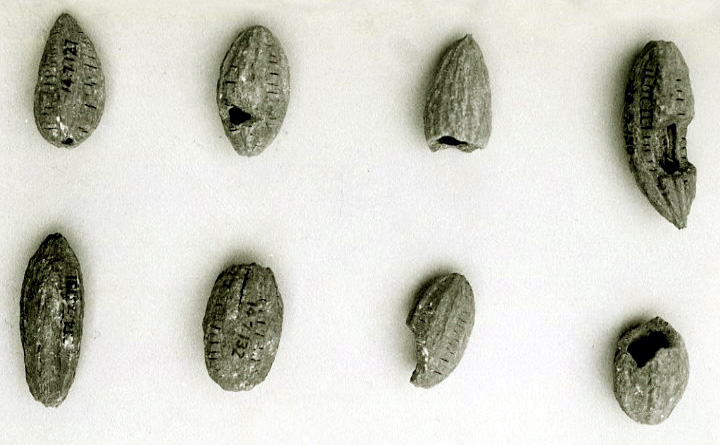
Fruits of Balanites aegyptiaca from Saqqara. Mastaba of Perneb, 5th dynasty of Egypt. MET.

Balanites aegyptiaca has been cultivated in Egypt for more than 4,000 years, and stones placed in tombs as votive offerings have been found as far back as the Twelfth Dynasty. The tree was described in 1592 by Prospero Alpini under the name 'agihalid'. Linnaeus regarded it as a species of Ximenia, but Michel Adanson proposed the new genus of Agialid. The genus Balanites was founded in 1813 by Delile.

The yellow, single-seeded fruit is edible, but bitter. Many parts of the plant are used as famine foods in Africa; the leaves are eaten raw or cooked, the oily seed is boiled to make it less bitter and eaten mixed with sorghum, and the flowers can be eaten. The tree is considered valuable in arid regions because it produces fruit even in dry times. The fruit can be fermented for alcoholic beverages.

The seed cake remaining after the oil is extracted is commonly used as animal fodder in Africa. The seeds of the Balanites aegyptiaca have molluscicide effect on Biomphalaria pfeifferi.

Where the species coexist, African elephants consume the desert date.

=== Medicinal ===
Desert date fruit is mixed into porridge and eaten by nursing mothers, and the oil is consumed for headache and to improve lactation.

Bark extracts and the fruit repel, or destroy, freshwater snails and copepods, organisms that act as intermediary hosts of parasites including Schistosoma, Bilharzia, and guinea worm. Worm infections are likewise treated with desert date, as are liver and spleen disorders. A decoction of the bark is also used as an abortifacient and an antidote for arrow poison in West African traditional medicine. The antigiardial (combating Giardia parasites), antiamoebic, antimicrobial, antioxidant activity and cytotoxicity of the fruits extract has been studied.

The seed contains 30-48% fixed (non-volatile) oil, like the leaves, fruit pulp, bark and roots, and contains the sapogenins diosgenin and yamogenin. Saponins likewise occur in the roots, bark wood and fruit.

=== Agroforestry ===
The tree is managed through agroforestry. It is planted along irrigation canals and is used to attract insects for trapping. The pale to brownish yellow wood is used to make furniture and durable items such as tools, and is a low-smoke firewood that makes good charcoal. The smaller trees and branches are used as living or cut fences because they are resilient and thorny. The tree fixes nitrogen. It is grown for its fruit in plantations in several areas. The bark yields fibers, the natural gums from the branches are used as glue, and the seeds have been used to make jewelry and beads.

=== Tattoos ===
Various Sahel tribes use the thorn of the tree to make incisions that result in tattoos.

== Ecology ==
The carpenter ant Camponotus sericeus feeds on the nectar exuded by the flowers. The larva of the cabbage tree emperor moth Bunaea alcinoe causes defoliation of the tree.
