= Cycloartane =

Chemical compound

Names
- IUPAC name 9,19-Cyclo-9β-lanostane
- Systematic IUPAC name (1R,3aS,3bS,5aS,9aR,10aS,12aR)-3a,6,6,12a-Tetramethyl-1-[(2R)-6-methylheptan-2-yl]tetradecahydro-1H,10H-cyclopenta[a]cyclopropa[e]phenanthrene
- Other names: Cycloorthane; 9,19-Cyclolanostane; 4,4,14-Trimethyl-9,19-cyclo-5alpha,9beta-cholestane

Identifiers
CAS Number	511-64-8
3D model (JSmol)	Interactive image
Beilstein Reference	3207210 3207211
ChEBI	CHEBI:37778
ChemSpider	141036
PubChem CID	160497
UNII	TJ8JF2M6U6
CompTox Dashboard (EPA)	DTXSID10965378
- InChI: InChI=1S/C30H52/c1-21(2)10-8-11-22(3)23-14-17-28(7)25-13-12-24-26(4,5)15-9-16-29(24)20-30(25,29)19-18-27(23,28)6/h21-25H,8-20H2,1-7H3/t22-,23-,24+,25+,27-,28+,29-,30+/m1/s1 Key: BSLYZLYLUUIFGZ-JRUDBKCSSA-N
- SMILES: C[C@H](CCCC(C)C)[C@H]1CC[C@@]2([C@@]1(CC[C@]34[C@H]2CC[C@@H]5[C@]3(C4)CCCC5(C)C)C)C

Properties
Chemical formula	C_{30}H_{52}
Molar mass	412.746 g·mol^{−1}
Density	0.95±0.1 g·cm^{−3}
- Except where otherwise noted, data are given for materials in their standard state (at 25 °C [77 °F], 100 kPa). Infobox references

Cycloartane is a triterpene, also known as 4,4,14-trimethyl-9,19-cyclo-5alpha,9beta-cholestane. Its derivative cycloartenol is the starting point for the synthesis of almost all plant steroids.

== See also ==
- Lanostane
- Cycloastragenol
- Cycloartenyl ferulate
