= Pierre Benveniste =

French researcher in plant biochemistry

Pierre Benveniste, born on 22 December 1937 in Neuilly-sur-Seine, is a French researcher in plant biochemistry and professor at the University of Strasbourg.

== Biography ==
Pierre Benveniste is a former student of the European School of Chemistry in Strasbourg (present name) (1962). After a PhD (Use of tissue cultures for the study of natural products) carried out under the direction of Professors Léon Hirth and Guy Ourisson and obtained in 1967, he turned his attention to the study of sterol biosynthesis in plants. In charge of research at the CNRS until 1970, he was appointed lecturer in 1970 and then professor in 1975 at the University of Strasbourg. He first became director of the ERA n° 487 of the CNRS then director of the isoprenoids department of the Institute of Plant Molecular Biology (IBMP) of the CNRS. from 1999 to 2002.

Pierre Benveniste is the author of numerous scientific publications, 112 in peer-reviewed journals.

His research work ceased in 2005 due to his retirement and he is now an honorary professor at the University of Strasbourg.

== Scientific contributions ==
Pierre Benveniste's work is carried out in the field of biosynthesis, metabolism and sterol function in plants. The latter, unlike cholesterol, are alkylated in position 24 and are the precursors of plant steroid hormones, the brassinolides. Studies carried out in his laboratory show that these sterols are structuring agents of plant cell membranes and in particular of the plasma membrane. Between 1963 and 1987, sterol biosynthesis was studied by radiochemical methods, enzymology and the use of inhibitors, analogues of transition states involved in the catalysis of target enzymes. The results obtained revealed an original biosynthetic pathway leading to sterols in photosynthetic eukaryotes. In the latter, cycloartenol, a pentacyclic triterpene, a product of the cyclisation of squalene epoxide, is a major biosynthetic intermediate, whereas the same role is played by lanosterol, a tetracyclic triterpene, in non-photosynthetic eukaryotes (fungi, vertebrates). The particularities of this biosynthetic pathway could influence plant-insect relationships.

The team joined IBMP in 1989. Using genetics and molecular biology in support of previous methods, cDNA clones encoding biosynthetic enzymes were isolated and characterized for the first time. Mutants affected in sterol biosynthesis, site1 mutant defective in Δ7 sterol-C5-desaturase, sterol mutant overproducing sterols were isolated, transformed plants with gain or loss of function were selected and identified. Advances in the knowledge of the regulation of the biosynthesis of sterols and their derivatives (esters, glucosides) as well as their functions have been obtained. Work focused on three enzyme systems: epoxide of squalene triterpene synthase, sterols C24 and C241 methyltransferases and Δ7 sterol-C5-desaturase.

The results show for the first time that in Arabidopsis and all higher plants there are two gene subfamilies: SMT1 and SMT2 coding for methyltransferases involved in the methylation reactions leading to the formation of 24-methyl and 24-ethyl cholesterols. The overexpression or cosuppression of SMT2 in tobacco or Arabidopsis lines has a profound impact on the relative proportions of 24-methyl and 24-ethyl cholesterol. In particular SMT2 plays a crucial role in adjusting the campesterol/sitosterol ratio to the value required for membrane integrity and balanced growth.

An Arabidopsis mutant has been isolated that contains mainly Δ7-sterols instead of the normal Δ5-sterols, and has a defect in the gene (STE1) encoding Δ7-sterol-C5(6)-desaturase. Subsequent work allowed the isolation and molecular characterization of the mutated STE1 allele. It was thus shown that the corresponding protein has an isoleucine instead of a threonine at position 114 and that this change resulted in a considerable decrease in enzyme activity. Directed mutagenesis work confirmed that T114 plays a particularly important role since its replacement with isoleucine results in a loss of function while its replacement with serine results in a considerable gain in function (Vmax multiplied by 28).

Other work has focused on the molecular characterization of the sterov tobacco mutant, a sterol overproducer. The results obtained show that the sterov mutation affects the activity of Hydroxy-Methyl-Glutaryl-CoA reductase, which is strongly stimulated in the mutant. More recent work highlights the importance of sterol esterification in this mutant. In this mutant, excess sterols are found in the form of sterol esters which accumulate dramatically in lipid globules. The work carried out shows that the plants have the originality of carrying out the cellular esterification of sterols by an enzyme (of LCAT type, lecithin cholesterol acyltransferase) different from that (of ACAT type, acylCoA cholesterol acyltransferase) operating in animals and fungi.

The avenues opened up during this work, summarized in a review article, were pursued after Pierre Benveniste's retirement in 2005 by researchers at the CNRS Plant Molecular Biology Institute (and other teams abroad) and now provide a better understanding of the role of sterols and their derivatives in various vital plant processes such as embryonic development, cell division, auxin transport, membrane flux and reflux, secretion of suberin, a major constituent of epidermis, and leaf senescence.

== Awards and honours ==
Prix Roussel, 1982.

Corresponding member of the French Academy of sciences, 1983.

Commandeur of the Palmes académiques, October 2015.
