= Sterol 14-demethylase =

Class of enzymes

sterol 14alpha-demethylase

Identifiers
- EC no.: 1.14.14.154

Databases
- BRENDA: enzyme data
- ExPASy: NiceZyme view
- KEGG: enzyme entry
- MetaCyc: metabolic pathway
- Rhea: reactions
- PDB structures: RCSB PDB PDBe PDBsum
- Gene Ontology: AmiGO / QuickGO
Search
- PMC: articles
- PubMed: articles
- NCBI: proteins

In enzymology, a sterol 14α-demethylase (EC 1.14.14.154, formerly 1.14.13.70) or CYP51 is an enzyme of the cytochrome P450 (CYP) superfamily. It is an important enzyme in the sterol biosynthesis, responsible for removing a methyl group from lanosterol (in animals and fungi) or obtusifoliol (in plants).

It catalyzes a chemical reaction generally described as:

a 14alpha-methyl steroid + 3 reduced [NADPH–hemoprotein reductase] + 3 O2 = a Delta(14) steroid + formate + 3 oxidized [NADPH–hemoprotein reductase] + 4 H2O + 4 H(+)

A particular example is:

obtusifoliol + 3 O_{2} + 3 NADPH + 3 H^{+} $\rightleftharpoons$ 4alpha-methyl-5alpha-ergosta-8,14,24(28)-trien-3beta-ol + formate + 3 NADP^{+} + 4 H_{2}O

The 4 substrates here are obtusifoliol, O_{2}, NADPH, and H^{+}, whereas its 4 products are 4alpha-methyl-5alpha-ergosta-8,14,24(28)-trien-3beta-ol, formate, NADP^{+}, and H_{2}O. This enzyme belongs to the family of oxidoreductases, specifically those acting on paired donors, with O_{2} as oxidant and incorporation or reduction of oxygen. The oxygen incorporated need not be derived from O_{2} with NADH or NADPH as one donor, and incorporation of one atom of oxygen into the other donor.

Ergosterol

The 14α-demethylase (CYP51) is present in some bacteria, animals, fungi, plants, and some protozoa: the only "ubiquitous P450". It appears in every sterol biosynthesis pathway known as of 2007. In animals (including humans), CYP51A1 catalyzes the demethylation of lanosterol or 24,25-dihydrolanosterol to create an important precursor that is eventually converted into cholesterol, a key determinant of the permeability and rigidity of plasma membranes. In fungi, the same reaction leads to the production of ergosterol, which plays an analogous role. The differences between animal and fungal versions of this enzyme allow antifungal medications to inhibit the fungal version and prevent the production of this key compound.

== Nomenclature ==
=== Enzyme nomenclature ===
The systematic name of this enzyme class is sterol,NADPH:oxygen oxidoreductase (14-methyl cleaving). Other names in common use include obtusufoliol 14-demethylase, lanosterol 14-demethylase, lanosterol 14alpha-demethylase, and sterol 14alpha-demethylase. This enzyme participates in biosynthesis of steroids.

=== CYP nomenclature ===
These are not the typical CYP subfamilies as the sequence identify cutoffs have been greatly relaxed. The initial subfamilies were created based on major taxonomic groups: CYP51A for Animals, CYP51B for Bacteria. CYP51C for Chromista, CYP51D for Dictyostelium, CYP51E for Euglenozoa, CYP51F for Fungi. These groups based on source organisms agree well with the actual relationships between the CYP51 enzymes because they are, with few exceptions, all derived from vertical inheritance.

Those groups with only one CYP51 per species are all called by one name: CYP51A1 is for all animal CYP51s since they are orthologous. The same is true for CYP51B, C, D, E and F. CYP51G (green plants) and CYP51Hs (monocots only so far) have individual sequence numbers, but this is more of a consequence of the plant community's historical neglect of orthology.

CYP subfamily	etymology	kingdom
CYP51A	Animals	Metazoa
CYP51B	Bacteria	Bacteria
CYP51C	Chromista	Chromista
CYP51D	Dictyostelium	Amoebozoa
CYP51E	Euglenozoa	Excavata
CYP51F	Fungi	Fungus
CYP51G	Green plants	Archaeplastida
CYP51H		monocots in Archaeplastida

Some organisms carry additional divergent CYP51 that are given separate subfamily names. As of April 2026, the P450 Atlas listed 64 subfamilies and 248 ortholog groups.

== Function ==
The biological role of this protein is well understood. The demethylated products of the CYP51 reaction are vital intermediates in pathways leading to the formation of cholesterol in humans, ergosterol in fungi, and other types of sterols in plants. These sterols localize to the plasma membrane of cells, where they play an important structural role in the regulation of membrane fluidity and permeability and also influence the activity of enzymes, ion channels, and other cell components that are embedded within. With the proliferation of immuno-suppressive diseases such as HIV/AIDS and cancer, patients have become increasingly vulnerable to opportunistic fungal infections (Richardson et al.). Seeking new means to treat such infections, drug researchers have begun targeting the 14α-demethylase enzyme in fungi; destroying the fungal cell's ability to produce ergosterol causes a disruption of the plasma membrane, thereby resulting in cellular leakage and ultimately the death of the pathogen (DrugBank).

Azoles are currently the most popular class of antifungals used in both agricultural and medical settings. These compounds bind as the sixth ligand to the heme group in CYP51, thereby altering the structure of the active site and acting as noncompetitive inhibitors. The effectiveness of imidazoles and triazoles (common azole subclasses) as inhibitors of 14α-demethylase have been confirmed through several experiments. Some studies test for changes in the production of important downstream ergosterol intermediates in the presence of these compounds. Other studies employ spectrophotometry to quantify azole-CYP51 interactions. Coordination of azoles to the prosthetic heme group in the enzyme's active site causes a characteristic shift in CYP51 absorbance, creating what is commonly referred to as a type II difference spectrum.

Prolonged use of azoles as antifungals has resulted in the emergence of drug resistance among certain fungal strains. Mutations in the coding region of CYP51 genes, overexpression of CYP51, and overexpression of membrane efflux transporters can all lead to resistance to these antifungals. Consequently, the focus of azole research is beginning to shift towards identifying new ways to circumvent this major obstacle.

== Structure ==
As of late 2007, 6 structures had been solved for this class of enzymes, with PDB accession codes PDB: 1H5Z, PDB: 1U13, PDB: 1X8V, PDB: 2BZ9, PDB: 2CI0, and PDB: 2CIB.

== Inhibitors ==
PC945 is an experimental CYP51 inhibitor being developed by Pulmocide that shows efficacy against respiratory fungal infections.
