= C27H42O3 =

The molecular formula C_{27}H_{42}O_{3} (molar mass: 414.62 g/mol, exact mass: 414.3134 u) may refer to:

- Diosgenin
- Metenolone enanthate
- Nandrolone nonanoate
- Onternabez
- Yamogenin, a sapogenin found in fenugreek
