= Tirucallane =

Names
- IUPAC name (20S)-13α,14β,17α-Lanostane
- Systematic IUPAC name (1S,3aR,3bR,5aS,9aR,9bS,11aS)-3a,6,6,9a,11a-Pentamethyl-1-[(2S)-6-methylheptan-2-yl]hexadecahydro-1H-cyclopenta[a]phenanthrene
- Other names (13α,14β,17α,20S)-Lanostane

Identifiers
CAS Number	2151853-72-2
3D model (JSmol)	Interactive image
ChEBI	CHEBI:73301
ChemSpider	21376191
PubChem CID	12312922
UNII	CWP59NF9TF
CompTox Dashboard (EPA)	DTXSID501310798
- InChI: InChI=1S/C30H54/c1-21(2)11-9-12-22(3)23-15-19-30(8)25-13-14-26-27(4,5)17-10-18-28(26,6)24(25)16-20-29(23,30)7/h21-26H,9-20H2,1-8H3/t22-,23-,24-,25+,26-,28+,29-,30+/m0/s1 Key: ZQIOPEXWVBIZAV-RSKDDJKESA-N
- SMILES: C[C@@H](CCCC(C)C)[C@@H]1CC[C@]2([C@]1(CC[C@H]3[C@H]2CC[C@@H]4[C@@]3(CCCC4(C)C)C)C)C

Properties
Chemical formula	C_{30}H_{54}
Molar mass	414.762 g·mol^{−1}
Density	0.897±0.06 g·cm^{−3}
Boiling point	461.3±12.0 °C
Solubility in water	hard in water
- Except where otherwise noted, data are given for materials in their standard state (at 25 °C [77 °F], 100 kPa). Infobox references

Tirucallane is a tetracyclic triterpene with the chemical formula C_{30}H_{54}. It is the 20S-stereoisomer of euphane and its derivatives, such as tirucalladienol, are found in Euphorbia and other plants.

Tirucalladienol

== See also ==
- Euphane
- Apotirucallane
- Octanorapotirucallane
