= Parkeol =

Names
- IUPAC name Lanosta-9(11),24-dien-3β-ol
- Systematic IUPAC name (1R,3aS,3bS,5aR,7S,9aS,11aR)-3a,6,6,9a,11a-Pentamethyl-1-[(2R)-6-methylhept-5-en-2-yl]-2,3,3a,3b,4,5,5a,6,7,8,9,9a,11,11a-tetradecahydro-1H-cyclopenta[a]phenanthren-7-ol

Identifiers
CAS Number	514-45-4
3D model (JSmol)	Interactive image
ChEBI	CHEBI:63460
ChemSpider	23255009
PubChem CID	12313974
UNII	FM88E87P32
CompTox Dashboard (EPA)	DTXSID20487430
- InChI: InChI=1S/C30H50O/c1-20(2)10-9-11-21(3)22-14-18-30(8)24-12-13-25-27(4,5)26(31)16-17-28(25,6)23(24)15-19-29(22,30)7/h10,15,21-22,24-26,31H,9,11-14,16-19H2,1-8H3/t21-,22-,24-,25+,26+,28-,29-,30+/m1/s1 Key: MLVSYGCURCOSKP-FXCPCPCLSA-N
- SMILES: [H][C@@]1(CC[C@@]2(C)[C@]3([H])CC[C@@]4([H])C(C)(C)[C@@H](O)CC[C@]4(C)C3=CC[C@]12C)[C@H](C)CCC=C(C)C

Properties
Chemical formula	C_{30}H_{50}O
Molar mass	426.729 g·mol^{−1}
- Except where otherwise noted, data are given for materials in their standard state (at 25 °C [77 °F], 100 kPa). Infobox references

Parkeol is a relatively uncommon sterol secondary metabolite found mostly in plants, particularly noted in Butyrospermum parkii (now called Vitellaria paradoxa, or the shea tree). It can be synthesized from cycloartenol under Brønsted and Lewis acidic conditions, as a minor product by several oxidosqualene cyclase enzymes, and is the sole product of the parkeol synthase enzyme.

Parkeol is the dominant sterol found Gemmata obscuriglobus, a planctomycete and a rare example of a sterol-synthesizing prokaryote. The only other sterol identified in this organism is lanosterol, a key component of the sterol biosynthetic pathway in animals and fungi; this relatively limited sterol repertoire may resemble the early evolution of sterol synthesis, which is ubiquitous in eukaryotes.
