= Cycloeucalenol =

Names
- IUPAC name (3β,4α,5α,9β)-4,14-Dimethyl-9,19-cycloergost-24(28)-en-3-ol
- Other names 3beta-Cycloeucalenol

Identifiers
CAS Number	469-39-6
3D model (JSmol)	Interactive image
ChEBI	CHEBI:16653
ChEMBL	ChEMBL225634
ChemSpider	91880
KEGG	C02141
PubChem CID	101690
UNII	7OF1Q9UE9R
CompTox Dashboard (EPA)	DTXSID70963693
- InChI: InChI=1S/C30H50O/c1-19(2)20(3)8-9-21(4)23-12-14-28(7)26-11-10-24-22(5)25(31)13-15-29(24)18-30(26,29)17-16-27(23,28)6/h19,21-26,31H,3,8-18H2,1-2,4-7H3/t21-,22+,23-,24+,25+,26+,27-,28+,29-,30+/m1/s1 Key: HUNLTIZKNQDZEI-PGFZVWMDSA-N
- SMILES: C[C@H]1[C@@H]2CC[C@H]3[C@@]4(CC[C@@H]([C@]4(CC[C@@]35[C@@]2(C5)CC[C@@H]1O)C)[C@H](C)CCC(=C)C(C)C)C

Properties
Chemical formula	C_{30}H_{50}O
Molar mass	426.729 g·mol^{−1}
- Except where otherwise noted, data are given for materials in their standard state (at 25 °C [77 °F], 100 kPa). (what is ?) Infobox references

Cycloeucalenol is a 3β-sterol, a pentacyclic triterpenoid and a member of phytosterols group. The compound derives from a hydride of a 5α-ergostane.

== Natural occurrence ==
Cycloeucalenol is a naturally occurring triterpenoid and a sterol-like compound found in certain plants (i.e. Boophone disticha, Herissanthia tiubae, etc.) and microorganisms. It is classified as a cycloartane-type triterpenoid, a subgroup of terpenoids characterized by a cyclopropane ring in their structure. Cycloeucalenol is an intermediate in the biosynthesis of phytosterols, which are essential components of plant cell membranes.

== Biosynthesis ==
Cycloeucalenol is derived from cycloartenol, a key precursor in the phytosterol biosynthetic pathway. The conversion involves enzymatic modifications, including the opening of the cyclopropane ring and subsequent rearrangements.
