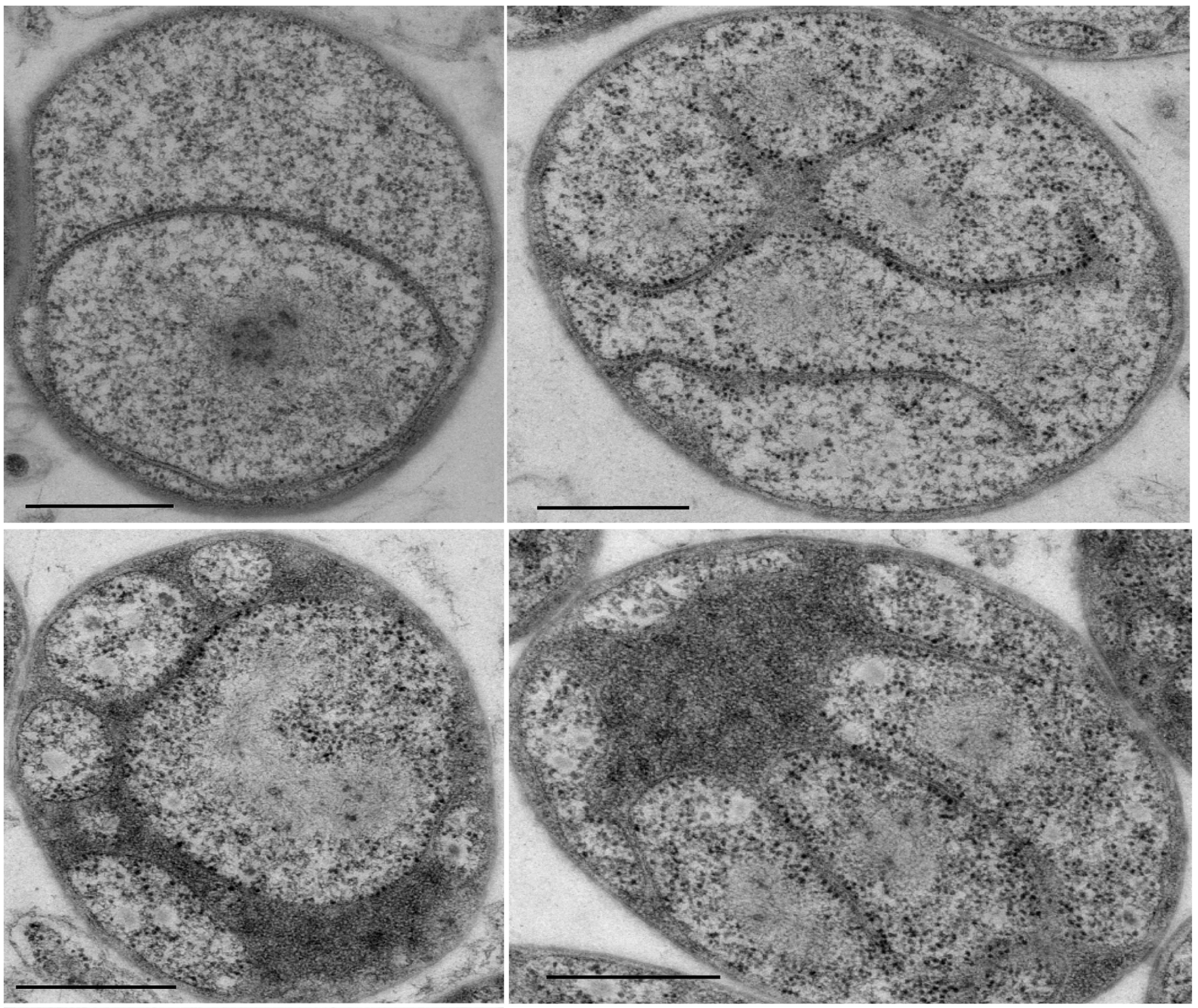
- Electron micrographs of representative examples illustrating G. obscuriglobus internal morphology. Scale bar = 500nm.

Scientific classification
- Domain: Bacteria
- Kingdom: Pseudomonadati
- Phylum: Planctomycetota
- Class: Planctomycetia
- Order: Gemmatales
- Family: Gemmataceae
- Genus: Gemmata
- Species: G. obscuriglobus

Binomial name
- Gemmata obscuriglobus Franzmann and Skerman 1985

= Gemmata obscuriglobus =

Species of bacteria

Gemmata obscuriglobus is a species of Gram-negative, aerobic, heterotrophic bacteria of the phylum Planctomycetota. G. obscuriglobus occur in freshwater habitats and was first described in 1984, and is the only described species in its genus.

Gemmata obscuriglobus is exceptional for its unusual morphology and for the unusual features in its genome, often considered to represent large differences in internal organization compared with most prokaryotes

== Structure and morphology ==
=== Cell shape and appendages ===
Gemmata obscuriglobus is a large, roughly spherical bacterium with a cell diameter of 1–2μm. It is motile and possesses multiple flagella per cell.

=== Internal cell composition ===
Dense, compact DNA and a deeply invaginated membrane are characteristics of the species.

=== Membrane structure ===
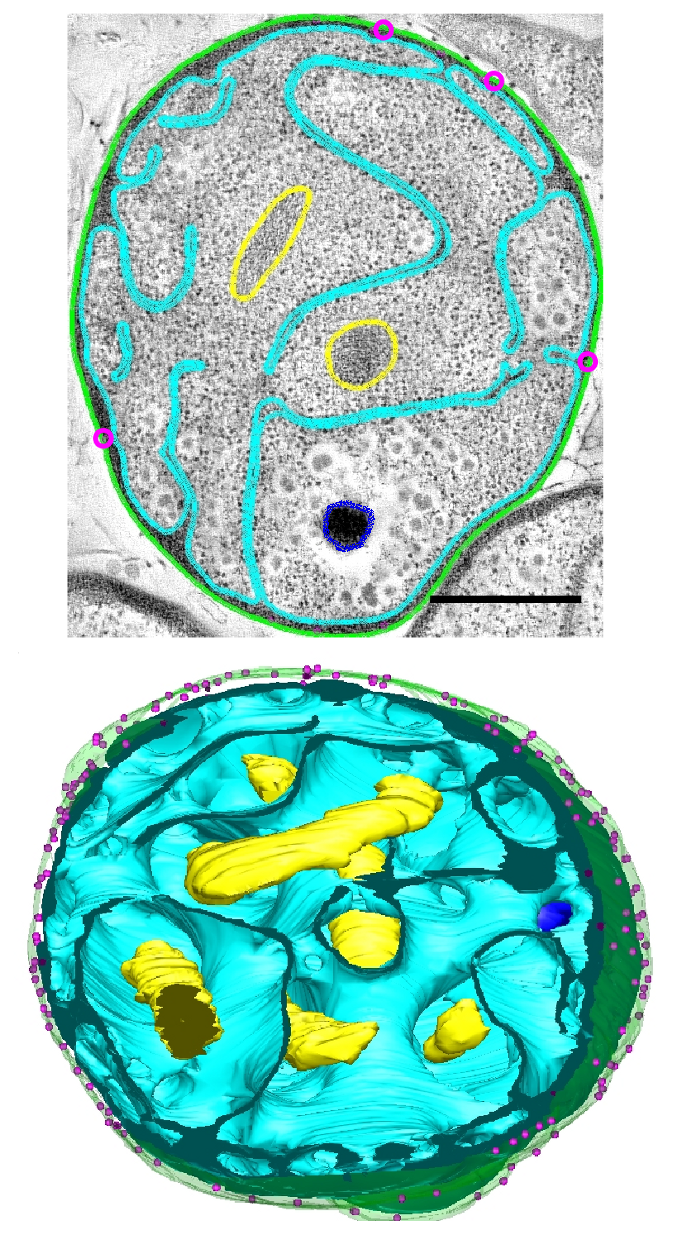
Electron micrograph (top) and whole-cell three-dimensional reconstruction (bottom) of Gemmata obscuriglobus. This reconstruction suggests continuous, non-enclosed membranes. The outer membrane is shown in green, the inner membrane in cyan, the DNA in yellow, a poly-phosphate granule in blue, and membrane cavitation in pink. Scale bar = 500nm.

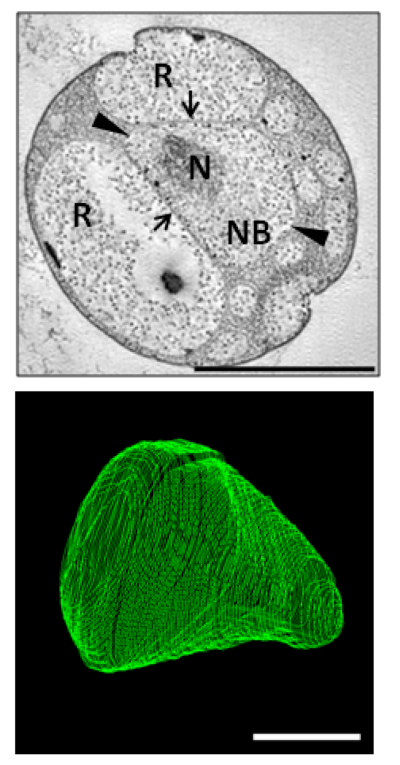
Electron micrograph (top) and three-dimensional reconstruction of the nuclear body (bottom) of Gemmata obscuriglobus. This reconstruction suggests a closed membrane around the nuclear body. The top panel labels the nuclear body (NB), nuclear DNA (N), and riboplasm (R). The nuclear body appears surrounded by a membrane that is a single layer in some places (arrowheads) and a double membrane in others (arrows). Top panel scale bar = 1µm, bottom panel scale bar = 500nm.

Among the most notable features of G. obscuriglobus is its highly complex and morphologically distinctive cell membrane system, including deep invaginations of its membrane that historically have been described as closed internal membranes that may surround the bacterium's DNA by analogy to a eukaryotic cell nucleus. The concept of membrane-bound genetic material has been described as a "cell plan" unique to a proposed PVC superphylum composed of the Planctomycetota, Verrucomicrobiota, and Chlamydiota and distinct from the rest of the Gram-negative bacteria. The question of whether G. obscuriglobus and other members of the PVC group possess closed internal membranes and therefore have a unique "cell plan" is considered important in understanding the evolution of membrane-bound compartments, which are often considered a distinguishing feature between eukaryotes and prokaryotes; the lineage that gave rise to the PVC superphylum is speculated to be related to an "intermediate" state between prokaryotes and eukaryotes. The question of how the PVC superfamily membranes are organized and how they relate to eukaryotes is an active and controversial area of research.

Three-dimensional tomogram reconstructions of whole cells reported in 2013 suggest that contrary to historical belief, G. obscuriglobus membranes are continuous and do not enclose distinct cellular compartments. However, this study has been criticized for not detecting or modeling some commonly reported structural features, and a 2014 study using similar methodology was interpreted as supporting the earlier hypothesis of closed internal compartments.

=== Membrane and cell wall composition ===
Early characterization of G. obscuriglobus found that it lacked a traditional Gram-negative peptidoglycan (PG) cell wall and instead possessed a proteinaceous exterior layer, later described as possibly analogous to an archaeal S-layer. More recent reports have found the exterior to more closely chemically resemble typical Gram-negative features. Compositional analysis of the membrane has been reported to find lipopolysaccharide in G. obscuriglobus, consistent with typical features of Gram-negative outer membranes. A 2015 study of several Planctomycetota including G. obscuriglobus identified the presence of a PG cell wall following the typical Gram-negative structure by both biochemical and bioinformatic analysis.

== Reproduction ==
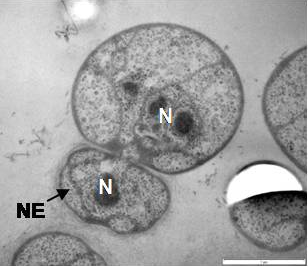
Electron micrograph of G. obscuriglobus in the process of dividing by budding. Labels indicate the nucleoid (N) of the mother (larger) and daughter (smaller) cells, and the nucleoid envelope (NE) of the daughter cell, which is described as not yet fully formed. Scale bar = 1μm.

Like most Planctomycetota, G. obscuriglobus reproduces by budding rather than the fission more commonly observed in bacterial species. It is relatively slow-growing, with an estimated generation time of around 13 hours based on bulk cell culture. Its life cycle consists of a motile or "swarmer" phase and a sessile phase during which budding occurs, although these are less distinct than in other Planctomycetota whose life cycles have been studied. Observations of individual cells in culture found that approximately 12 hours were required for bud maturation and separation, followed by an asymmetrical lag phase in which mother cells were quicker to begin a new budding cycle than were newly budded daughter cells.

It has been reported that the budding process involves transfer of naked DNA to the daughter cell, after which it is then surrounded by a nucleoid membrane. However, three-dimensional reconstructions indicate that DNA is never surrounded by a closed membrane in a newly created bud, but instead is free to diffuse from the mother to daughter cell cytoplasm after the "neck" between the mother and daughter cell membranes, initially as narrow as 30 nanometers, widens sufficiently to accommodate condensed DNA.

== Genetic characteristics ==
=== Genomic content and organization ===
The G. obscuriglobus genome was sequenced by the J. Craig Venter Institute. The bacterium has a large genome by the standards of other PVC bacteria, around 9 megabases, and contains about 8,000 genes. It has 67% GC content. It possesses unusual genetic infrastructure, lacking a key component of most bacterial cell division processes, the protein FtsZ. A study of indels in protein-coding genes of the PVC grouping identified a number of biochemical pathways with unusually high numbers of indels in the G. obscuriglobus genome, including ribosomal proteins.

=== Nucleoids ===
One or more nucleoid-like regions of densely compact DNA is commonly observed in G. obscuriglobus cells. Complex internal structure resembling a liquid crystal has been reported, with some structural similarities to the chromatin of eukaryotes such as dinoflagellates. The structure of the nucleoid has been implicated in the unusual radiation tolerance of G. obscuriglobus.

Transcription and translation of genes have been reported to occur in spatially segregated locations within the cell, which is otherwise characteristic of eukaryotic but not prokaryotic cells.

== Physiology ==
=== Sterol synthesis ===
Gemmata obscuriglobus is one of the few prokaryotes known to synthesize sterols, a process critical to the maintenance of eukaryotic cell membranes and ubiquitous in eukaryotes. The sterols identified in the bacterium, lanosterol and parkeol, are relatively simple compared to eukaryotic sterols; as indicated by phylogenetic analysis, the G. obscuriglobus sterol biosynthetic pathway was among the most primitive known at the time it was identified.

=== Endocytosis ===
Gemmata obscuriglobus was the first bacterium shown to possess a mechanism for protein import into the cell, analogous to eukaryotic endocytosis. Active, ATP-dependent, likely receptor-mediated import of extracellular proteins has been observed under laboratory conditions, although it is of unknown functional significance. This may suggest that Planctomycetota and eukaryote endocytosis mechanism share a common evolutionary origin, that the two processes may be an example of convergent evolution, or that G. obscuriglobus acquired its endocytotic infrastructure through horizontal gene transfer; of the three possibilities, the latter is considered unlikely due to statistical features of the bacterial genes associated with the process. There is disagreement over the possibility that proteins with homology to clathrins are represented in the G. obscuriglobus proteome. The bacterium's ability to synthesize sterols may also be involved in its capacity for membrane invaginations and endocytosis because sterols are known to facilitate membrane deformation.
