= Euphane =

Names
- IUPAC name 13α,14β-Lanostane
- Systematic IUPAC name (1S,3aR,3bR,5aS,9aR,9bS,11aS)-3a,6,6,9a,11a-Pentamethyl-1-[(2R)-6-methylheptan-2-yl]hexadecahydro-1H-cyclopenta[a]phenanthrene

Identifiers
CAS Number	516-29-0
3D model (JSmol)	Interactive image
ChemSpider	25942061
PubChem CID	12312921
CompTox Dashboard (EPA)	DTXSID401337036
- InChI: InChI=1S/C30H54/c1-21(2)11-9-12-22(3)23-15-19-30(8)25-13-14-26-27(4,5)17-10-18-28(26,6)24(25)16-20-29(23,30)7/h21-26H,9-20H2,1-8H3/t22-,23+,24+,25-,26+,28-,29+,30-/m1/s1 Key: ZQIOPEXWVBIZAV-RRKMEGOCSA-N
- SMILES: C[C@H](CCCC(C)C)[C@@H]1CC[C@]2([C@]1(CC[C@H]3[C@H]2CC[C@@H]4[C@@]3(CCCC4(C)C)C)C)C

Properties
Chemical formula	C_{30}H_{54}
Molar mass	414.762 g·mol^{−1}
Density	0.897 g/cm^{3}
- Except where otherwise noted, data are given for materials in their standard state (at 25 °C [77 °F], 100 kPa). Infobox references

Euphane is a tetracyclic triterpene that is the 13α,14β-stereoisomer of lanostane. Its derivatives are widely distributed in many plants.

Euphanes is also the name of a person to whom Plutarch addressed his essay "Whether an Old Man Should Engage in Public Affairs", they are not otherwise known to history.

== See also ==
- Protostane
- Dammarane
- Lanostane
