= Nandrolone nonanoate =

Chemical compound

Clinical data
- Other names: 19-Nortestosterone 17β-nonanoate; Nandrolone pelargonate; 19-Nortestosterone 17β-pelargonate
- Drug class: Androgen; Anabolic steroid; Androgen ester; Progestogen

Identifiers
- IUPAC name: [(8R,9S,10R,13S,14S,17S)-13-methyl-3-oxo-2,6,7,8,9,10,11,12,14,15,16,17-dodecahydro-1H-cyclopenta[a]phenanthren-17-yl] nonanoate
- CAS Number: 52230-64-5
- UNII: 2B78GY4XY5

Chemical and physical data
- Formula: C_{27}H_{42}O_{3}
- Molar mass: 414.630 g·mol^{−1}
- 3D model (JSmol): Interactive image
- SMILES: CCCCCCCCC(=O)O[C@H]1CC[C@H]2[C@@H]3CCC4=CC(=O)CC[C@@H]4[C@H]3CC[C@]12C
- InChI: InChI=1S/C27H42O3/c1-3-4-5-6-7-8-9-26(29)30-25-15-14-24-23-12-10-19-18-20(28)11-13-21(19)22(23)16-17-27(24,25)2/h18,21-25H,3-17H2,1-2H3/t21-,22+,23+,24-,25-,27-/m0/s1 AuxInfo=1/0/N:1,30,2,3,4,5,6,7,8,18,23,17,24,14,13,27,28,20,19,21,25,26,16,15,12,9,29,22,10,11/it:im/rA:30CCCCCCCCCOOCCCCCCCCCCOCCCCCCCC/rB:s1;s2;s3;s4;s5;s6;s7;s8;d9;s9;p11;s12;s13;p14;s15;N16;s17;s18;d19;s20;d21;s21;s23;s19n24;s16s25;P26;s27;s12s15s28;P29;/rC:-11.2241,.7601,0;-9.8904,-.0099,0;-8.5567,.7601,0;-7.223,-.0099,0;-5.8893,.7601,0;-4.5557,-.0099,0;-3.222,.7601,0;-1.8883,-.0099,0;-.5546,.7601,0;-.5546,2.3001,0;.7791,-.0099,0;2.1127,.7601,0;2.2737,2.2917,0;3.7801,2.6118,0;4.5501,1.2782,0;6.0564,.958,0;7.0869,2.1024,0;8.5932,1.7822,0;9.0691,.3176,0;10.5754,-.0026,0;11.0513,-1.4672,0;12.5577,-1.7874,0;10.0209,-2.6117,0;8.5145,-2.2915,0;8.0386,-.8268,0;6.5323,-.5067,0;5.5018,-1.6511,0;3.9955,-1.3309,0;3.5196,.1337,0;2.3751,-.8967,0; Key:UVVFTQBZOQSECA-QNTYDACNSA-N

Nandrolone nonanoate, also known as nandrolone pelargonate or as 19-nortestosterone 17β-nonanoate, is an androgen and anabolic steroid and an androgen ester—specifically, the C17β nonanoate (pelargonate) ester of nandrolone (19-nortestosterone)—which was studied but was never marketed.
