= Achilleol A =

Names
- IUPAC name (1S,3R)-2,2-dimethyl-4-methylidene-3-[(3E,7E,11E)-3,8,12,16-tetramethylheptadeca-3,7,11,15-tetraenyl]cyclohexan-1-ol

Identifiers
CAS Number	125287-06-1
3D model (JSmol)	Interactive image
ChEBI	CHEBI:189410
ChEMBL	ChEMBL1977780
ChemSpider	4581493
PubChem CID	5471312
- InChI: InChI=1S/C30H50O/c1-23(2)13-11-16-25(4)18-12-17-24(3)14-9-10-15-26(5)19-21-28-27(6)20-22-29(31)30(28,7)8/h13-15,18,28-29,31H,6,9-12,16-17,19-22H2,1-5,7-8H3/b24-14+,25-18+,26-15+/t28-,29+/m1/s1 Key: ANKPMKKGZZQDIC-HJSIMFEZSA-N
- SMILES: CC(=CCC/C(=C/CC/C(=C/CC/C=C(\C)/CC[C@@H]1C(=C)CC[C@@H](C1(C)C)O)/C)/C)C

Properties
Chemical formula	C_{30}H_{50}O
Molar mass	426.729 g·mol^{−1}
Density	g/cm^{3}
Melting point	116 °C
- Except where otherwise noted, data are given for materials in their standard state (at 25 °C [77 °F], 100 kPa). Infobox references

Achilleol A is a monocyclic triterpene with the molecular formula C_{30}H_{50}O.

== Natural occurrence ==
The compound is found in such taxons as Achillea odorata, Camellia oleifera, Santolina elegans, Triticum aestivum, among others.

== Synthesis ==
There is a simple method for synthesizing the monocyclic triterpene achilleol A, employing titanium(III) chemistry as the crucial step. This synthesis validates the structure previously determined by spectroscopic analysis.
