= Pulmocide =

- Type: Privately held company
- Industry: Biopharmaceutical Research, Medical, Drug Discovery
- Founded: January 2007; 19 years ago
- Headquarters: Imperial College London, United Kingdom
- Area served: European Union
- Key people: Garth Rapeport, (CEO); Peter Strong (CSO)
- Website: pulmocide.com

Pulmocide is a privately held biopharmaceutical company focusing on the discovery and development of inhaled medicine for the treatment of life-threatening fungal and viral infections of the respiratory tract. The company is based in London and has a laboratory at the Imperial College's Innovation Hub.

== History ==
Pulmocide was formed in 2007 by Garth Rapeport (CEO) and Pete Strong (CSO) who previously co-founded RespiVert Ltd alongside Peter J. Barnes and Kazuhiro Ito. RespiVert was acquired by a division of Johnson & Johnson in 2010.

In March 2017, Pulmocide raised $30 million in Series B Financing. The round was led by SR One and included Longwood Fund, SV Life Sciences, F-Prime Capital, Johnson & Johnson Innovation and Touchstone Innovations plc.

== Drug development ==
Pulmocide is conducting phase 2 trials with PC945, a potent inhaled antifungal agent for the treatment of Aspergillus infections of the lung in patients with asthma, cystic fibrosis or following lung transplantation. Positive initial efficacy data for PC945 in treatment refractory Aspergillus infection following lung transplantation is reported. Pulmocide is conducting a study with PC786, an antiviral compound for the treatment of Human orthopneumovirus, formerly Human respiratory syncytial virus (HRSV). A recent in-silico study on PC786 has been published in Science Advances, AAAS, that showed improved binding efficacy against the Severe acute respiratory syndrome coronavirus 2.

In July 2019, Pulmocide announced a Scientific Reports (Nature Research) publication showing PC945 in combination with standard antifungal treatment causes a synergistic effect against Aspergillus fumigatus.
