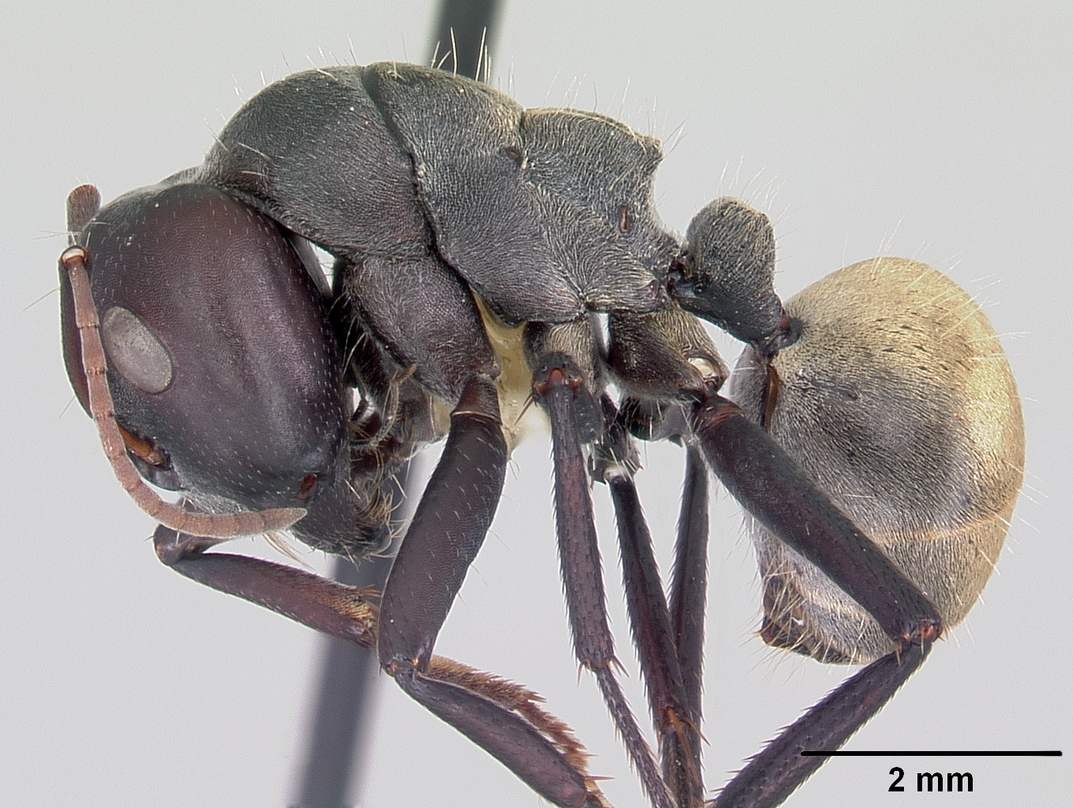
- Camponotus sericeus worker

Scientific classification
- Domain: Eukaryota
- Kingdom: Animalia
- Phylum: Arthropoda
- Class: Insecta
- Order: Hymenoptera
- Family: Formicidae
- Subfamily: Formicinae
- Genus: Camponotus
- Subgenus: Orthonotomyrmex
- Species: C. sericeus

Binomial name
- Camponotus sericeus (Fabricius, 1798)

= Camponotus sericeus =

Species of carpenter ant

Camponotus sericeus is a species of carpenter ant (genus Camponotus) widely distributed in the Afrotropical and oriental regions. Additionally, Camponotus sericeus is known as a common pest that damages structures and is very difficult to get rid of.

== Subspecies ==
- Camponotus sericeus euchrous Santschi, 1926
- Camponotus sericeus peguensis Emery, 1895
- Camponotus sericeus sanguiniceps Donisthorpe, 1942
- Camponotus sericeus sulgeri Santschi, 1913
