= Steroid =

Polycyclic organic compound having sterane as a core structure

Structure of 24-ethyl-lanostane, a prototypical steroid with 32 carbon atoms. Its core ring system (ABCD), composed of 17 carbon atoms, is shown with IUPAC-approved ring lettering and atom numbering.

A steroid is an organic compound with four fused rings (designated A, B, C, and D) arranged in a specific molecular configuration.

Steroids have two principal biological functions: as important components of cell membranes that alter membrane fluidity; and as signaling molecules. Examples include the lipid cholesterol, sex hormones estradiol and testosterone, anabolic steroids, and the anti-inflammatory corticosteroid drug dexamethasone. Hundreds of steroids are found in fungi, plants, and animals. All steroids are manufactured in cells from sterol precursors: cholesterol and lanosterol (in opisthokonts), or cycloartenol (in plants). All three of these molecules are produced via cyclization of the triterpene squalene.

== Structure ==
The steroid nucleus (core structure) is called gonane (cyclopentanoperhydrophenanthrene). It is typically composed of seventeen carbon atoms, bonded in four fused rings: three six-member cyclohexane rings (rings A, B and C in the first illustration) and one five-member cyclopentane ring (the D ring). Steroids vary by the functional groups attached to this four-ring core and by the oxidation state of the rings. Sterols are forms of steroids with a hydroxy group at position three and a skeleton derived from cholestane. Steroids can also be more radically modified, such as by changes to the ring structure, for example, cutting one of the rings. Cutting Ring B produces secosteroids one of which is vitamin D_{3}.

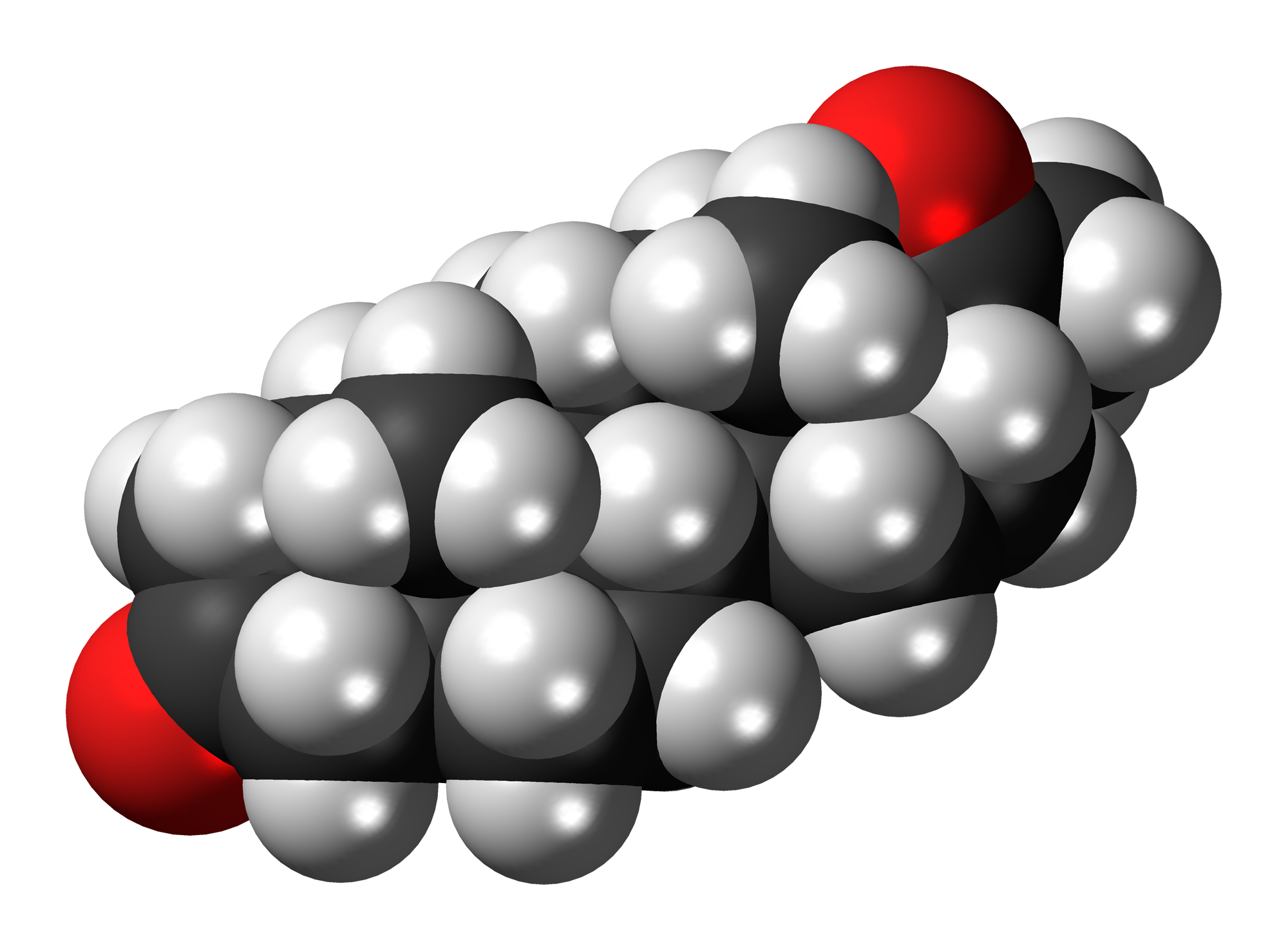
Space-filling representation

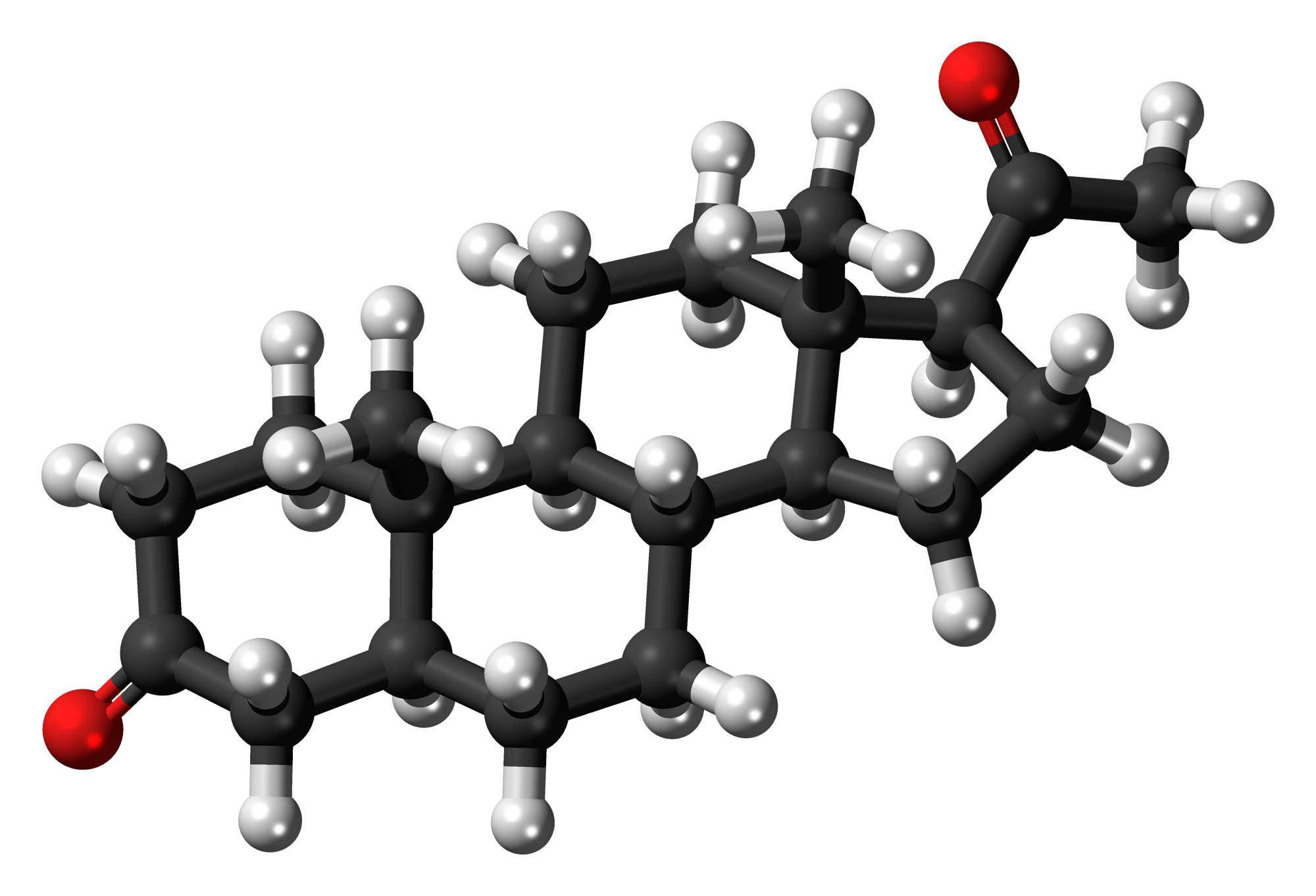
Ball-and-stick representation

5α-dihydroprogesterone (5α-DHP), a steroid. The shape of the four rings of most steroids is illustrated (carbon atoms in black, oxygens in red and hydrogens in gray). The nonpolar "slab" of hydrocarbon in the middle (gray, black) and the polar groups at opposing ends (red) are common features of natural steroids. 5α-DHP is an endogenous steroid hormone and a biosynthetic intermediate.

== Nomenclature ==
=== Rings and functional groups ===
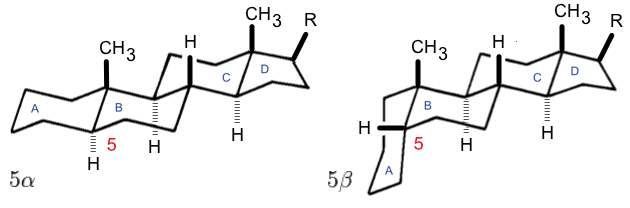
Steroid 5α and 5β stereoisomers

Steroids are named after the sterol cholesterol which was first described in gall stones from Ancient Greek chole- 'bile' and stereos 'solid'.

Gonane, also known as steran or cyclopentanoperhydrophenanthrene, the nucleus of all steroids and sterols, is composed of seventeen carbon atoms in carbon-carbon bonds forming four fused rings in a three-dimensional shape. The three cyclohexane rings (A, B, and C in the first illustration) form the skeleton of a perhydro derivative of phenanthrene. The D ring has a cyclopentane structure. When the two methyl groups and eight carbon side chains (at C-17, as shown for cholesterol) are present, the steroid is said to have a cholestane framework. The two common 5α and 5β stereoisomeric forms of steroids exist because of differences in the side of the largely planar ring system where the hydrogen (H) atom at carbon-5 is attached, which results in a change in steroid A-ring conformation. Isomerisation at the C-21 side chain produces a parallel series of compounds, referred to as isosteroids.

Examples of steroid structures are:

Testosterone, the principal male sex hormone and an anabolic steroid

Cholic acid, a bile acid

Dexamethasone, a synthetic corticosteroid drug

Lanosterol, the biosynthetic precursor to animal steroids. The number of carbons (30) indicates its triterpenoid classification.

Progesterone, a steroid hormone involved in the female menstrual cycle, pregnancy, and embryogenesis

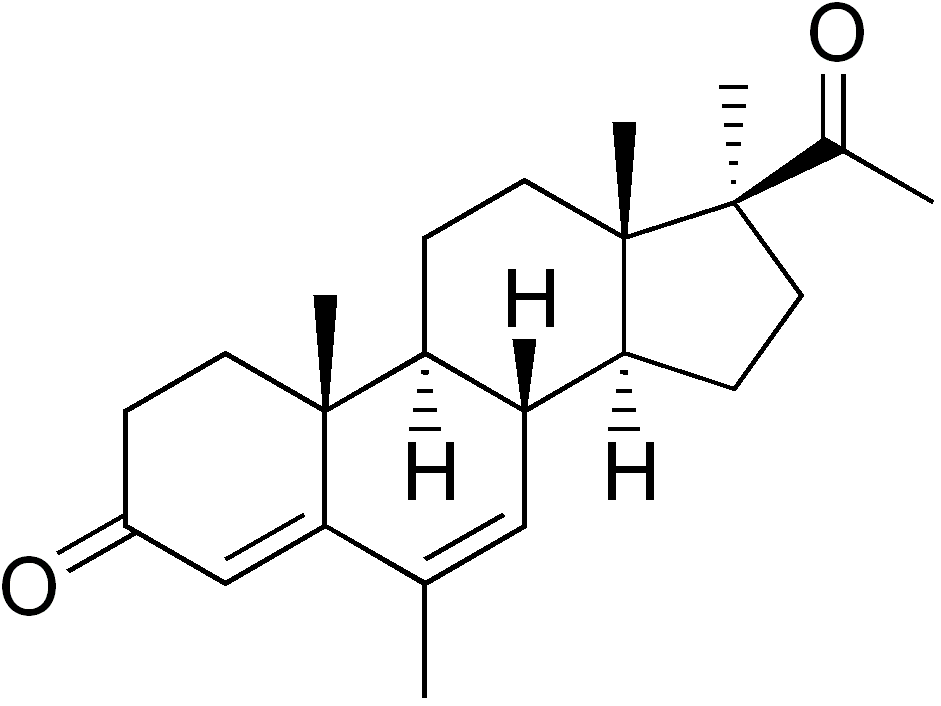
Medrogestone, a synthetic drug with effects similar to progesterone

β-Sitosterol, a plant or phytosterol, with a fully branched hydrocarbon side chain at C-17 and an hydroxyl group at C-3

In addition to the ring scissions (cleavages), expansions and contractions (cleavage and reclosing to a larger or smaller rings)—all variations in the carbon-carbon bond framework—steroids can also vary:

- in the bond orders within the rings,
- in the number of methyl groups attached to the ring (and, when present, on the prominent side chain at C17),
- in the functional groups attached to the rings and side chain, and
- in the configuration of groups attached to the rings and chain.

For instance, sterols such as cholesterol and lanosterol have a hydroxyl group attached at position C-3, while testosterone and progesterone have a carbonyl (oxo substituent) at C-3. Among these compounds, only lanosterol has two methyl groups at C-4. Cholesterol which has a C-5 to C-6 double bond, differs from testosterone and progesterone which have a C-4 to C-5 double bond.

Cholesterol, a prototypical animal sterol. This structural lipid and key steroid biosynthetic precursor.

5α-cholestane, a common steroid core

=== Naming convention ===
Almost all biologically relevant steroids can be presented as a derivative of a parent cholesterol-like hydrocarbon structure that is a skeleton. These parent structures have specific names, such as pregnane, androstane, etc. The derivatives carry various functional groups called suffixes or prefixes after the respective numbers, indicating their position in the steroid nucleus. There are widely used trivial steroid names of natural origin with significant biologic activity, such as progesterone, testosterone or cortisol. Some of these names are defined in The Nomenclature of Steroids. These trivial names can also be used as a base to derive new names, however, by adding prefixes only rather than suffixes, e.g., the steroid 17α-hydroxyprogesterone has a hydroxy group (-OH) at position 17 of the steroid nucleus comparing to progesterone.

The letters α and β denote absolute stereochemistry at chiral centers—a specific nomenclature distinct from the R/S convention of organic chemistry to denote absolute configuration of functional groups, known as Cahn–Ingold–Prelog priority rules. The R/S convention assigns priorities to substituents on a chiral center based on their atomic number. The highest priority group is assigned to the atom with the highest atomic number, and the lowest priority group is assigned to the atom with the lowest atomic number. The molecule is then oriented so that the lowest priority group points away from the viewer, and the remaining three groups are arranged in order of decreasing priority around the chiral center. If this arrangement is clockwise, it is assigned an R configuration; if it is counterclockwise, it is assigned an S configuration. In contrast, steroid nomenclature uses α and β to denote stereochemistry at chiral centers. The α and β designations are based on the orientation of substituents relative to each other in a specific ring system. In general, α refers to a substituent that is oriented towards the plane of the ring system, while β refers to a substituent that is oriented away from the plane of the ring system. In steroids drawn from the standard perspective used in this paper, α-bonds are depicted on figures as dashed wedges and β-bonds as solid wedges.

The name "11-deoxycortisol" is an example of a derived name that uses cortisol as a parent structure without an oxygen atom (hence "deoxy") attached to position 11 (as a part of a hydroxy group). The numbering of positions of carbon atoms in the steroid nucleus is set in a template found in the Nomenclature of Steroids that is used regardless of whether an atom is present in the steroid in question.

Unsaturated carbons (generally, ones that are part of a double bond) in the steroid nucleus are indicated by changing -ane to -ene. This change was traditionally done in the parent name, adding a prefix to denote the position, with or without Δ (Greek capital delta) which designates unsaturation, for example, 4-pregnene-11β,17α-diol-3,20-dione (also Δ^{4}-pregnene-11β,17α-diol-3,20-dione) or 4-androstene-3,11,17-trione (also Δ^{4}-androstene-3,11,17-trione). However, the Nomenclature of Steroids recommends the locant of a double bond to be always adjacent to the syllable designating the unsaturation, therefore, having it as a suffix rather than a prefix, and without the use of the Δ character, i.e. pregn-4-ene-11β,17α-diol-3,20-dione or androst-4-ene-3,11,17-trione. The double bond is designated by the lower-numbered carbon atom, i.e. "Δ^{4}-" or "4-ene" means the double bond between positions 4 and 5. The saturation of carbons of a parent steroid can be done by adding "dihydro-" prefix, i.e., a saturation of carbons 4 and 5 of testosterone with two hydrogen atoms is 4,5α-dihydrotestosterone or 4,5β-dihydrotestosterone. Generally, when there is no ambiguity, one number of a hydrogen position from a steroid with a saturated bond may be omitted, leaving only the position of the second hydrogen atom, e.g., 5α-dihydrotestosterone or 5β-dihydrotestosterone. The Δ^{5}-steroids are those with a double bond between carbons 5 and 6 and the Δ^{4} steroids are those with a double bond between carbons 4 and 5.

The abbreviations like "P4" for progesterone and "A4" for androstenedione for refer to Δ^{4}-steroids, while "P5" for pregnenolone and "A5" for androstenediol refer to Δ^{5}-steroids.

The suffix -ol denotes a hydroxy group, while the suffix -one denotes an oxo group. When two or three identical groups are attached to the base structure at different positions, the suffix is indicated as -diol or -triol for hydroxy, and -dione or -trione for oxo groups, respectively. For example, 5α-pregnane-3α,17α-diol-20-one has a hydrogen atom at the 5α position (hence the "5α-" prefix), two hydroxy groups (-OH) at the 3α and 17α positions (hence "3α,17α-diol" suffix) and an oxo group (=O) at the position 20 (hence the "20-one" suffix). However, erroneous use of suffixes can be found, e.g., "5α-pregnan-17α-diol-3,11,20-trione" [sic] — since it has just one hydroxy group (at 17α) rather than two, then the suffix should be -ol, rather than -diol, so that the correct name to be "5α-pregnan-17α-ol-3,11,20-trione".

According to the rule set in the Nomenclature of Steroids, the terminal "e" in the parent structure name should be elided before the vowel (the presence or absence of a number does not affect such elision). This means, for instance, that if the suffix immediately appended to the parent structure name begins with a vowel, the trailing "e" is removed from that name. An example of such removal is "5α-pregnan-17α-ol-3,20-dione", where the last "e" of "pregnane" is dropped due to the vowel ("o") at the beginning of the suffix -ol. Some authors incorrectly use this rule, eliding the terminal "e" where it should be kept, or vice versa.

The term "11-oxygenated" refers to the presence of an oxygen atom as an oxo (=O) or hydroxy (-OH) substituent at carbon 11. "Oxygenated" is consistently used within the chemistry of the steroids since the 1950s. Some studies use the term "11-oxyandrogens" as an abbreviation for 11-oxygenated androgens, to emphasize that they all have an oxygen atom attached to carbon at position 11. However, in chemical nomenclature, the prefix "oxy" is associated with ether functional groups, i.e., a compound with an oxygen atom connected to two alkyl or aryl groups (R-O-R), therefore, using "oxy" within the name of a steroid class may be misleading. One can find clear examples of "oxygenated" to refer to a broad class of organic molecules containing a variety of oxygen containing functional groups in other domains of organic chemistry, and it is appropriate to use this convention.

Even though "keto" is a standard prefix in organic chemistry, the 1989 recommendations of the Joint Commission on Biochemical Nomenclature discourage the application of the prefix "keto" for steroid names, and favor the prefix "oxo" (e.g., 11-oxo steroids rather than 11-keto steroids), because "keto" includes the carbon that is part of the steroid nucleus and the same carbon atom should not be specified twice.

== Species distribution ==
Steroids are present across all domains of life, including bacteria, archaea, and eukaryotes. In eukaryotes, steroids are particularly abundant in fungi, plants, and animals.

=== Eukaryotic ===
Eukaryotic cells, encompassing animals, plants, fungi, and protists, are characterized by their complex cellular structures, including a true nucleus and membrane-bound organelles. Sterols, a subgroup of steroids, play key roles in maintaining membrane fluidity, supporting cell signaling, and enhancing stress tolerance. These compounds are integral to eukaryotic membranes, where they contribute to membrane integrity and functionality.

During eukaryogenesis—the evolutionary process that gave rise to modern eukaryotic cells—steroids likely enabled the endosymbiotic acquisition of mitochondria.

=== Prokaryotic ===
Although sterol biosynthesis is rare in prokaryotes, certain bacteria, including Methylococcus capsulatus, specific methanotrophs, myxobacteria, and the planctomycete Gemmata obscuriglobus, are capable of producing sterols. In G. obscuriglobus, sterols are essential for cell viability, but their roles in other bacteria remain poorly understood.

Prokaryotic sterol synthesis involves the tetracyclic steroid framework, as found in myxobacteria, as well as hopanoids, pentacyclic lipids that regulate bacterial membrane functions. These sterol biosynthetic pathways may have originated in bacteria or been transferred from eukaryotes.

Sterol synthesis depends on two key enzymes: squalene monooxygenase and oxidosqualene cyclase. Phylogenetic analyses of oxidosqualene cyclase (Osc) suggest that some bacterial Osc genes may have been acquired via horizontal gene transfer from eukaryotes, as certain bacterial Osc proteins closely resemble their eukaryotic homologs.

=== Fungal ===
Fungal steroids include the ergosterols, which are involved in maintaining the integrity of the fungal cellular membrane. Various antifungal drugs, such as amphotericin B and azole antifungals, use this information to kill pathogenic fungi. Fungi can alter their ergosterol content (e.g. through loss of function mutations in the enzymes ERG3 or ERG6, inducing depletion of ergosterol, or mutations that decrease the ergosterol content) to develop resistance to drugs that target ergosterol.

Ergosterol is analogous to the cholesterol found in the cellular membranes of animals (including humans), or the phytosterols found in the cellular membranes of plants. All mushrooms contain large quantities of ergosterol, in the range of tens to hundreds of milligrams per 100 grams of dry weight. Oxygen is necessary for the synthesis of ergosterol in fungi.

Ergosterol is responsible for the vitamin D content found in mushrooms; ergosterol is chemically converted into provitamin D2 by exposure to ultraviolet light. Provitamin D2 spontaneously forms vitamin D2. However, not all fungi use ergosterol in their cellular membranes; for example, the pathogenic fungal species Pneumocystis jirovecii does not, which has important clinical implications (given the mechanism of action of many antifungal drugs). Using the fungus Saccharomyces cerevisiae as an example, other major steroids include ergosta‐5,7,22,24(28)‐tetraen‐3β‐ol, zymosterol, and lanosterol. S. cerevisiae uses 5,6‐dihydroergosterol in place of ergosterol in its cell membrane.

=== Plant ===
Plant steroids include steroidal alkaloids found in Solanaceae and Melanthiaceae (specially the genus Veratrum), cardiac glycosides, the phytosterols and the brassinosteroids (which include several plant hormones).

=== Animal ===
Animal steroids include compounds of vertebrate and insect origin, the latter including ecdysteroids such as ecdysterone (controlling molting in some species). Vertebrate examples include the steroid hormones and cholesterol; the latter is a structural component of cell membranes that helps determine the fluidity of cell membranes and is a principal constituent of plaque (implicated in atherosclerosis). Steroid hormones include:

- Sex hormones, which influence sex differences and support puberty and reproduction. These hormones include androgens, estrogens, and progestogens.
- Corticosteroids, including most synthetic steroid drugs, with natural product classes the glucocorticoids (which regulate many aspects of metabolism and immune function) and the mineralocorticoids (which help maintain blood volume and control renal excretion of electrolytes)
- Anabolic steroids, natural and synthetic, which interact with androgen receptors to increase muscle and bone synthesis. In popular use, the term "steroids" often refers to anabolic steroids.

== Types ==
=== By function ===
Steroids function in a wide variety of physiological processes, including metabolism, inflammation regulation, immune response, reproduction, and cellular signaling. Their effects are mediated primarily through binding to specific intracellular receptors, which then influence gene transcription and protein synthesis. Steroids can be broadly classified by their primary biological roles, with the major classes of steroid hormones illustrated below, along with prominent members and examples of their functions.

- Corticosteroids: Produced by the adrenal cortex, these hormones regulate stress responses, electrolyte balance, and immune function.
  - Glucocorticoids: Involved in carbohydrate metabolism, anti-inflammatory actions, and immunosuppression.
    - Cortisol, which increases blood glucose levels during stress and suppresses immune activity to prevent excessive inflammation.
  - Mineralocorticoids: Control salt and water balance to maintain blood pressure.
    - Aldosterone, which promotes sodium reabsorption in the kidneys, thereby regulating extracellular fluid volume.
- Sex steroids: Derived mainly from the gonads and adrenal glands, these influence sexual development, reproduction, and secondary sexual characteristics.
  - Progestogens: Essential for preparing the reproductive system for pregnancy.
    - Progesterone, which supports implantation and sustains early pregnancy by maintaining the uterine lining.
  - Androgens: Promote male reproductive development and maintenance.
    - Testosterone, which drives spermatogenesis and the growth of male secondary sex characteristics such as muscle mass and facial hair.
  - Estrogens: Key to female reproductive cycles and skeletal health.
    - Estradiol, which stimulates endometrial proliferation during the menstrual cycle and contributes to bone density.

Other steroids extend beyond hormonal roles and include compounds involved in neuroprotection, digestion, and neuromuscular activity:

- Neurosteroids such as dehydroepiandrosterone (DHEA) and allopregnanolone, which modulate neurotransmitter receptors in the brain.
- Bile acids such as taurocholic acid, which aid in lipid digestion and absorption in the intestine.
- Aminosteroid neuromuscular blocking agents (synthetic), such as pancuronium bromide, used in anesthesia to induce muscle relaxation.
- Steroidal antiandrogens (synthetic), such as cyproterone acetate, which block androgen receptors in hormone therapy.
- Steroidogenesis inhibitors (exogenous), such as alfatradiol, which suppress steroid synthesis for therapeutic purposes.
- Membrane sterols such as cholesterol (essential for cell membrane fluidity), ergosterol (a fungal membrane component), and various phytosterols (plant-derived sterols with cholesterol-lowering effects).
- Toxins such as steroidal saponins (plant defense compounds) and cardenolides/cardiac glycosides (which affect heart function).

Steroids with an open-ring structure, known as secosteroids, include:

- Vitamin D forms such as ergocalciferol (from plant and fungal sources), cholecalciferol (from animal sources and sunlight), and calcitriol (the active form that regulates calcium homeostasis).

=== By structure ===
==== Intact ring system ====
Steroids can be classified based on their chemical composition. One example of how MeSH performs this classification is available at the Wikipedia MeSH catalog. Examples of this classification include:

Cholecalciferol (vitamin D_{3}), an example of a 9,10-secosteroid

Cyclopamine, an example of a complex C-nor-D-homosteroid

Class	Example	Number of carbon atoms
Cholestanes	Cholesterol	27
Cholanes	Cholic acid	24
Pregnanes	Progesterone	21
Androstanes	Testosterone	19
Estranes	Estradiol	18

In biology, it is common to name the above steroid classes by the number of carbon atoms present when referring to hormones: C_{18}-steroids for the estranes (mostly estrogens), C_{19}-steroids for the androstanes (mostly androgens), and C_{21}-steroids for the pregnanes (mostly corticosteroids). The classification "17-ketosteroid" is also important in medicine.

The gonane (steroid nucleus) is the parent 17-carbon tetracyclic hydrocarbon molecule with no alkyl sidechains.

==== Cleaved, contracted, and expanded rings ====
Secosteroids (Latin seco, "to cut") are a subclass of steroidal compounds resulting, biosynthetically or conceptually, from scission (cleavage) of parent steroid rings (generally one of the four). Major secosteroid subclasses are defined by the steroid carbon atoms where this scission has taken place. For instance, the prototypical secosteroid cholecalciferol, vitamin D_{3} (shown), is in the 9,10-secosteroid subclass and derives from the cleavage of carbon atoms C-9 and C-10 of the steroid B-ring; 5,6-secosteroids and 13,14-steroids are similar.

Norsteroids (nor-, L. norma; "normal" in chemistry, indicating carbon removal) and homosteroids (homo-, Greek homos; "same", indicating carbon addition) are structural subclasses of steroids formed from biosynthetic steps. The former involves enzymic ring expansion-contraction reactions, and the latter is accomplished (biomimetically) or (more frequently) through ring closures of acyclic precursors with more (or fewer) ring atoms than the parent steroid framework.

Combinations of these ring alterations are known in nature. For instance, ewes who graze on corn lily ingest cyclopamine (shown) and veratramine, two of a sub-family of steroids where the C- and D-rings are contracted and expanded respectively via a biosynthetic migration of the original C-13 atom. Ingestion of these C-nor-D-homosteroids results in birth defects in lambs: cyclopia from cyclopamine and leg deformity from veratramine. A further C-nor-D-homosteroid (nakiterpiosin) is excreted by Okinawan cyanobacteriosponges. e.g., Terpios hoshinota, leading to coral mortality from black coral disease. Nakiterpiosin-type steroids are active against the signaling pathway involving the smoothened and hedgehog proteins, a pathway which is hyperactive in a number of cancers.

== Biological significance ==
Steroids and their metabolites are often signalling molecules (the most notable examples are steroid hormones), and steroids and phospholipids are components of cell membranes. Steroids such as cholesterol decrease membrane fluidity. Similar to lipids, steroids are highly concentrated energy stores. However, they are not typically sources of energy; in mammals, they are normally metabolized and excreted.

Steroids play critical roles in a number of disorders, including malignancies like prostate cancer, where steroid production inside and outside the tumor promotes cancer cell aggressiveness.

== Biosynthesis and metabolism ==
Simplified representation of lanosterol (steroid) synthesis. The intermediates isopentenyl pyrophosphate (PP or IPP) and dimethylallyl pyrophosphate (DMAPP) form geranyl pyrophosphate (GPP), squalene and lanosterol (which can be converted into other steroids).

The hundreds of steroids found in animals, fungi, and plants are made from lanosterol (in animals and fungi; see examples above) or cycloartenol (in other eukaryotes). Both lanosterol and cycloartenol derive from cyclization of the triterpenoid squalene. Lanosterol and cycloartenol are sometimes called protosterols because they are the starting compounds for all other steroids.

Steroid biosynthesis is an anabolic pathway which produces steroids from simple precursors. A unique biosynthetic pathway is followed in animals (compared to many other organisms), making the pathway a common target for antibiotics and other anti-infection drugs. Steroid metabolism in humans is also the target of cholesterol-lowering drugs, such as statins. In humans and other animals the biosynthesis of steroids follows the mevalonate pathway, which uses acetyl-CoA as building blocks for dimethylallyl diphosphate (DMAPP) and isopentenyl diphosphate (IPP).

In subsequent steps DMAPP and IPP conjugate to form farnesyl diphosphate (FPP), which further conjugates with each other to form the linear triterpenoid squalene. Squalene biosynthesis is catalyzed by squalene synthase, which belongs to the squalene/phytoene synthase family. Subsequent epoxidation and cyclization of squalene generate lanosterol, which is the starting point for additional modifications into other steroids (steroidogenesis). In other eukaryotes, the cyclization product of epoxidized squalene (oxidosqualene) is cycloartenol.

=== Mevalonate pathway ===
Mevalonate pathway

The mevalonate pathway (also called HMG-CoA reductase pathway) begins with acetyl-CoA and ends with dimethylallyl diphosphate (DMAPP) and isopentenyl diphosphate (IPP).

DMAPP and IPP donate isoprene units, which are assembled and modified to form terpenes and isoprenoids (a large class of lipids, which include the carotenoids and form the largest class of plant natural products). Here, the activated isoprene units are joined to make squalene and folded into a set of rings to make lanosterol. Lanosterol can then be converted into other steroids, such as cholesterol and ergosterol.

Two classes of drugs target the mevalonate pathway: statins (like rosuvastatin), which are used to reduce elevated cholesterol levels, and bisphosphonates (like zoledronate), which are used to treat a number of bone-degenerative diseases.

=== Steroidogenesis ===
Human steroidogenesis, with the major classes of steroid hormones, individual steroids and enzymatic pathways. Changes in molecular structure from a precursor are highlighted in white.

Steroidogenesis is the biological process by which steroids are generated from cholesterol and changed into other steroids. The pathways of steroidogenesis differ among species. The major classes of steroid hormones, as noted above (with their prominent members and functions), are the progestogens, corticosteroids (corticoids), androgens, and estrogens. Human steroidogenesis of these classes occurs in a number of locations:

- Progestogens are the precursors of all other human steroids, and all human tissues which produce steroids must first convert cholesterol to pregnenolone. This conversion is the rate-limiting step of steroid synthesis, which occurs inside the mitochondrion of the respective tissue. The conversion is catalyzed by the mitochondrial P450scc system.
- Cortisol, corticosterone, aldosterone are produced in the adrenal cortex.
- Estradiol, estrone and progesterone are made primarily in the ovary, estriol in placenta during pregnancy, and testosterone primarily in the testes (some testosterone may also be produced in the adrenal cortex).
- Estradiol is converted from testosterone directly (in males), or via the primary pathway DHEA – androstenedione – estrone and secondarily via testosterone (in females).
- Stromal cells have been shown to produce steroids in response to signaling produced by androgen-starved prostate cancer cells.
- Some neurons and glia in the central nervous system (CNS) express the enzymes required for the local synthesis of pregnenolone, progesterone, DHEA and DHEAS, de novo or from peripheral sources.

Production rates, secretion rates, clearance rates, and blood levels of major sex hormones
Sex	Sex hormone	Reproductive phase	Blood production rate	Gonadal secretion rate	Metabolic clearance rate	Reference range (serum levels)	
Sex	Sex hormone	Reproductive phase	Blood production rate	Gonadal secretion rate	Metabolic clearance rate	Molar concentration	Mass concentration
Men	Androstenedione	–	2.8 mg/day	1.6 mg/day	2200 L/day	2.8–7.3 nmol/L	80–210 ng/dL
Men	Testosterone	–	6.5 mg/day	6.2 mg/day	950 L/day	6.9–34.7 nmol/L	200–1000 ng/dL
Men	Estrone	–	150 μg/day	110 μg/day	2050 L/day	37–250 pmol/L	10–70 pg/mL
Men	Estradiol	–	60 μg/day	50 μg/day	1600 L/day	<37–210 pmol/L	10–57 pg/mL
Men	Estrone sulfate	–	80 μg/day	Insignificant	167 L/day	600–2500 pmol/L	200–900 pg/mL
Women	Androstenedione	–	3.2 mg/day	2.8 mg/day	2000 L/day	3.1–12.2 nmol/L	89–350 ng/dL
Women	Testosterone	–	190 μg/day	60 μg/day	500 L/day	0.7–2.8 nmol/L	20–81 ng/dL
Women	Estrone	Follicular phase	110 μg/day	80 μg/day	2200 L/day	110–400 pmol/L	30–110 pg/mL
Women	Estrone	Luteal phase	260 μg/day	150 μg/day	2200 L/day	310–660 pmol/L	80–180 pg/mL
Women	Estrone	Postmenopause	40 μg/day	Insignificant	1610 L/day	22–230 pmol/L	6–60 pg/mL
Women	Estradiol	Follicular phase	90 μg/day	80 μg/day	1200 L/day	<37–360 pmol/L	10–98 pg/mL
Women	Estradiol	Luteal phase	250 μg/day	240 μg/day	1200 L/day	699–1250 pmol/L	190–341 pg/mL
Women	Estradiol	Postmenopause	6 μg/day	Insignificant	910 L/day	<37–140 pmol/L	10–38 pg/mL
Women	Estrone sulfate	Follicular phase	100 μg/day	Insignificant	146 L/day	700–3600 pmol/L	250–1300 pg/mL
Women	Estrone sulfate	Luteal phase	180 μg/day	Insignificant	146 L/day	1100–7300 pmol/L	400–2600 pg/mL
Women	Progesterone	Follicular phase	2 mg/day	1.7 mg/day	2100 L/day	0.3–3 nmol/L	0.1–0.9 ng/mL
Women	Progesterone	Luteal phase	25 mg/day	24 mg/day	2100 L/day	19–45 nmol/L	6–14 ng/mL
Notes and sources Notes: "The concentration of a steroid in the circulation is determined by the rate at which it is secreted from glands, the rate of metabolism of precursor or prehormones into the steroid, and the rate at which it is extracted by tissues and metabolized. The secretion rate of a steroid refers to the total secretion of the compound from a gland per unit time. Secretion rates have been assessed by sampling the venous effluent from a gland over time and subtracting out the arterial and peripheral venous hormone concentration. The metabolic clearance rate of a steroid is defined as the volume of blood that has been completely cleared of the hormone per unit time. The production rate of a steroid hormone refers to entry into the blood of the compound from all possible sources, including secretion from glands and conversion of prohormones into the steroid of interest. At steady state, the amount of hormone entering the blood from all sources will be equal to the rate at which it is being cleared (metabolic clearance rate) multiplied by blood concentration (production rate = metabolic clearance rate × concentration). If there is little contribution of prohormone metabolism to the circulating pool of steroid, then the production rate will approximate the secretion rate." Sources: See template.

=== Alternative pathways ===
In plants and bacteria, the non-mevalonate pathway (MEP pathway) uses pyruvate and glyceraldehyde 3-phosphate as substrates to produce IPP and DMAPP.

During diseases pathways otherwise not significant in healthy humans can come into use. For example, in one form of congenital adrenal hyperplasia a deficiency in the 21-hydroxylase enzymatic pathway leads to an excess of 17α-Hydroxyprogesterone (17-OHP) – this pathological excess of 17-OHP in turn may be converted to dihydrotestosterone (DHT, a potent androgen) through among others 17,20 Lyase (a member of the cytochrome P450 family of enzymes), 5α-Reductase and 3α-Hydroxysteroid dehydrogenase.

== Catabolism and excretion ==
Steroids are primarily oxidized by cytochrome P450 oxidase enzymes, such as CYP3A4. These reactions introduce oxygen into the steroid ring, allowing the cholesterol to be broken up by other enzymes into bile acids. These acids can then be eliminated by secretion from the liver in bile. The expression of the oxidase gene can be upregulated by the steroid sensor PXR when there is a high blood concentration of steroids. Steroid hormones, lacking the side chain of cholesterol and bile acids, are typically hydroxylated at various ring positions or oxidized at the 17 position, conjugated with sulfate or glucuronic acid and excreted in the urine.

== Isolation, structure determination, and methods of analysis ==
Steroid isolation, depending on context, is the isolation of chemical matter required for chemical structure elucidation, derivitzation or degradation chemistry, biological testing, and other research needs (generally milligrams to grams, but often more or the isolation of "analytical quantities" of the substance of interest (where the focus is on identifying and quantifying the substance (for example, in biological tissue or fluid). The amount isolated depends on the analytical method, but is generally less than one microgram.

The methods of isolation to achieve the two scales of product are distinct, but include extraction, precipitation, adsorption, chromatography, and crystallization. In both cases, the isolated substance is purified to chemical homogeneity; combined separation and analytical methods, such as LC-MS, are chosen to be "orthogonal"—achieving their separations based on distinct modes of interaction between substance and isolating matrix—to detect a single species in the pure sample.

Structure determination refers to the methods to determine the chemical structure of an isolated pure steroid, using an evolving array of chemical and physical methods which have included NMR and small-molecule crystallography. Methods of analysis overlap both of the above areas, emphasizing analytical methods to determining if a steroid is present in a mixture and determining its quantity.

== Chemical synthesis ==
Microbial catabolism of phytosterol side chains yields C-19 steroids, C-22 steroids, and 17-ketosteroids (i.e. precursors to adrenocortical hormones and contraceptives). The addition and modification of functional groups is key when producing the wide variety of medications available within this chemical classification. These modifications are performed using conventional organic synthesis and/or biotransformation techniques.

=== Precursors ===
==== Semisynthesis ====
The semisynthesis of steroids often begins from precursors such as cholesterol, phytosterols, or sapogenins. The efforts of Syntex, a company involved in the Mexican barbasco trade, used Dioscorea mexicana to produce the sapogenin diosgenin in the early days of the synthetic steroid pharmaceutical industry.

==== Total synthesis ====
Some steroidal hormones are economically obtained only by total synthesis from petrochemicals (e.g. 13-alkyl steroids). For example, the pharmaceutical Norgestrel begins from methoxy-1-tetralone, a petrochemical derived from phenol.

== Research awards ==
A number of Nobel Prizes have been awarded for steroid research, including:

- 1927 (Chemistry) Heinrich Otto Wieland — Constitution of bile acids and sterols and their connection to vitamins
- 1928 (Chemistry) Adolf Otto Reinhold Windaus — Constitution of sterols and their connection to vitamins
- 1939 (Chemistry) Adolf Butenandt and Leopold Ružička — Isolation and structural studies of steroid sex hormones, and related studies on higher terpenes
- 1950 (Physiology or Medicine) Edward Calvin Kendall, Tadeus Reichstein, and Philip Hench — Structure and biological effects of adrenal hormones
- 1965 (Chemistry) Robert Burns Woodward — In part, for the synthesis of cholesterol, cortisone, and lanosterol
- 1969 (Chemistry) Derek Barton and Odd Hassel — Development of the concept of conformation in chemistry, emphasizing the steroid nucleus
- 1975 (Chemistry) Vladimir Prelog — In part, for developing methods to determine the stereochemical course of cholesterol biosynthesis from mevalonic acid via squalene

== See also ==
- Adrenal gland
- Batrachotoxin
- List of steroid abbreviations
- List of steroids
- Membrane steroid receptor
- Pheromone
- Reverse cholesterol transport
- Steroidogenesis inhibitor
- Steroidogenic acute regulatory protein
- Steroidogenic enzyme

== Bibliography ==
- Russel CA (2005). "Organic Chemistry: Natural products, Steroids". In Russell CA, Roberts GK (eds.). Chemical History: Reviews of the Recent Literature. Cambridge: RSC Publ. ISBN 978-0-85404-464-1.
- "Russell Marker Creation of the Mexican Steroid Hormone Industry - Landmark -". American Chemical Society. 1999. Archived from the original on 12 February 2020.
- Lednicer D (2011). Steroid Chemistry at a Glance. Hoboken: Wiley. doi:10.1002/9780470973639. ISBN 978-0-470-66085-0. A concise history of the study of steroids.
- Yoder RA, Johnston JN (December 2005). "A case study in biomimetic total synthesis: polyolefin carbocyclizations to terpenes and steroids". Chemical Reviews. 105 (12): 4730–56. doi:10.1021/cr040623l. PMC 2575671. PMID 16351060. A review of the history of steroid synthesis, especially biomimetic.
- Han TS, Walker BR, Arlt W, Ross RJ (February 2014). "Treatment and health outcomes in adults with congenital adrenal hyperplasia". Nature Reviews. Endocrinology. 10 (2): 115–24. doi:10.1038/nrendo.2013.239. PMID 24342885. S2CID 6090764. Adrenal steroidogenesis pathway.
- Greep RO, ed. (22 October 2013). "Cortoic acids". Recent Progress in Hormone Research: Proceedings of the 1979 Laurentian Hormone Conference. Elsevier Science. pp. 345–391. ISBN 978-1-4832-1956-1.
- Bowen RA (20 October 2001). "Steroidogenesis". Pathophysiology of the Endocrine System. Colorado State University. Archived from the original on 28 February 2009.
