= Euphol =

Names
- IUPAC name (3S,5R,10S,13S,14S,17S)-4,4,10,13,14-pentamethyl-17-[(2R)-6-methylhept-5-en-2-yl]-2,3,5,6,7,11,12,15,16,17-decahydro-1H-cyclopenta[a]phenanthren-3-ol
- Other names Euphadienol

Identifiers
CAS Number	514-47-6
3D model (JSmol)	Interactive image
ChEBI	CHEBI:4940
ChEMBL	ChEMBL465181
ChemSpider	390292
KEGG	C08624
PubChem CID	441678
CompTox Dashboard (EPA)	DTXSID201318412
- InChI: InChI=1S/C30H50O/c1-20(2)10-9-11-21(3)22-14-18-30(8)24-12-13-25-27(4,5)26(31)16-17-28(25,6)23(24)15-19-29(22,30)7/h10,21-22,25-26,31H,9,11-19H2,1-8H3/t21-,22+,25+,26+,28-,29+,30-/m1/s1 Key: CAHGCLMLTWQZNJ-WZLOIPHISA-N
- SMILES: C[C@H](CCC=C(C)C)[C@@H]1CC[C@]2([C@]1(CCC3=C2CC[C@@H]4[C@@]3(CC[C@@H](C4(C)C)O)C)C)C

Properties
Chemical formula	C_{30}H_{50}O
Molar mass	426.729 g·mol^{−1}
Density	g/cm^{3}
Melting point	116 °C (241 °F; 389 K)
- Except where otherwise noted, data are given for materials in their standard state (at 25 °C [77 °F], 100 kPa). Infobox references

Euphol is a tetracyclic triterpene with the molecular formula C_{30}H_{50}O.

== Natural occurrence ==
Euphol was isolated from cucumber and is an active principle of various plant species belonging to the Euphorbia genus.

== Uses ==
The compound is known for its potential hypotensive, anti-inflammatory, and antitumor activities.
