= Lanostane =

Names
- Other names 4,4,14α-Trimethylcholestane

Identifiers
CAS Number	474-20-4 (5α); 57496-02-3 (5β)
3D model (JSmol)	(5α): Interactive image; (5β): Interactive image
ChEBI	CHEBI:20265 (5α)
ChemSpider	7827588 (5α)
PubChem CID	9548665 (5α)
CompTox Dashboard (EPA)	DTXSID60963824
- InChI: InChI=1S/C30H54/c1-21(2)11-9-12-22(3)23-15-19-30(8)25-13-14-26-27(4,5)17-10-18-28(26,6)24(25)16-20-29(23,30)7/h21-26H,9-20H2,1-8H3/t22-,23-,24+,25-,26+,28-,29-,30+/m1/s1 Key: ZQIOPEXWVBIZAV-ZKYCIREVSA-N; (5α): InChI=1/C30H54/c1-21(2)11-9-12-22(3)23-15-19-30(8)25-13-14-26-27(4,5)17-10-18-28(26,6)24(25)16-20-29(23,30)7/h21-26H,9-20H2,1-8H3/t22-,23-,24+,25-,26+,28-,29-,30+/m1/s1 Key: ZQIOPEXWVBIZAV-ZKYCIREVBA
- SMILES: (5α): C[C@H](CCCC(C)C)[C@@]1([H])CC[C@@]2(C)[C@]3([H])CC[C@@]4([H])C(C)(C)CCC[C@]4(C)[C@@]3([H])CC[C@@]21C; (5β): C[C@H](CCCC(C)C)[C@@]1([H])CC[C@@]2(C)[C@]3([H])CC[C@]4([H])C(C)(C)CCC[C@]4(C)[C@@]3([H])CC[C@@]21C

Properties
Chemical formula	C_{30}H_{54}
Molar mass	414.762 g·mol^{−1}
Melting point	98 to 99 °C (208 to 210 °F; 371 to 372 K)
- Except where otherwise noted, data are given for materials in their standard state (at 25 °C [77 °F], 100 kPa). verify (what is ?) Infobox references

Lanostane or 4,4,14α-trimethylcholestane is a tetracyclic chemical compound with formula C_{30}H_{54}. It is a polycyclic hydrocarbon, specifically a triterpene. It is an isomer of cucurbitane.

The name is applied to two stereoisomers, distinguished by the prefixes 5α- and 5β-, which differ by the handedness of the bonds at a particular carbon atom (number 5 in the standard steroid numbering scheme).

5α-Lanostane

5β-Lanostane

Replacement of a hydrogen atom attached to carbon number 3 in the 5α isomer with a hydroxyl group results in lanosterol, the biogenetic precursor of the steroids in animals.
