= Yamogenin =

Names
- IUPAC name (25S)-Spirost-5-en-3β-ol
- Systematic IUPAC name (2S,4aR,4bS,6aS,6bR,7S,8R,9aS,10aS,10bS)-4a,5′,6a,7-Tetramethyl-1,2,3,4,4a,4b,5,6,6a,6b,7,9a,10,10a,10b,11-hexadecahydrospiro[naphtho[2′,1′:4,5]indeno[2,1-b]furan-8,2′-oxan]-2-ol

Identifiers
CAS Number	512-06-1
3D model (JSmol)	Interactive image
ChEMBL	ChEMBL400807
ChemSpider	390476
PubChem CID	441900
UNII	M487OD4XW3
CompTox Dashboard (EPA)	DTXSID60903922
- InChI: InChI=1S/C27H42O3/c1-16-7-12-27(29-15-16)17(2)24-23(30-27)14-22-20-6-5-18-13-19(28)8-10-25(18,3)21(20)9-11-26(22,24)4/h5,16-17,19-24,28H,6-15H2,1-4H3/t16-,17-,19-,20+,21-,22-,23-,24-,25-,26-,27+/m0/s1 Key: WQLVFSAGQJTQCK-CAKNJAFZSA-N; InChI=1S/C27H42O3/c1-16-7-12-27(29-15-16)17(2)24-23(30-27)14-22-20-6-5-18-13-19(28)8-10-25(18,3)21(20)9-11-26(22,24)4/h5,16-17,19-24,28H,6-15H2,1-4H3/t16-,17-,19-,20+,21-,22-,23-,24-,25-,26-,27+/m0/s1; Key: WQLVFSAGQJTQCK-CAKNJAFZSA-N
- SMILES: C[C@H]1CC[C@@]2([C@H]([C@H]3[C@@H](O2)C[C@@H]4[C@@]3(CC[C@H]5[C@H]4CC=C6[C@@]5(CC[C@@H](C6)O)C)C)C)OC1

Properties
Chemical formula	C_{27}H_{42}O_{3}
Molar mass	414.630 g·mol^{−1}
- Except where otherwise noted, data are given for materials in their standard state (at 25 °C [77 °F], 100 kPa). verify (what is ?) Infobox references

Yamogenin is a chemical compound of the class called spirostanol sapogenins. It is found in the herb fenugreek (Trigonella foenum-graecum) and other plants.
