= Tirucallol =

- Skeletal formula

Names
- Preferred IUPAC name (3β)-Dammara-7,24-dien-3-ol

Identifiers
CAS Number	514-46-5
3D model (JSmol)	Interactive image
ChEBI	CHEBI:175463
ChemSpider	91501
PubChem CID	101257
CompTox Dashboard (EPA)	DTXSID001317294
- InChI: InChI=1S/C30H50O/c1-20(2)10-9-11-21(3)22-14-18-30(8)24-12-13-25-27(4,5)26(31)16-17-28(25,6)23(24)15-19-29(22,30)7/h10,21-22,25-26,31H,9,11-19H2,1-8H3/t21-,22-,25-,26-,28+,29-,30+/m0/s1 Key: CAHGCLMLTWQZNJ-HGKXYCPESA-N
- SMILES: C[C@@H](CCC=C(C)C)[C@@H]1CC[C@]2([C@]1(CCC3=C2CC[C@@H]4[C@@]3(CC[C@@H](C4(C)C)O)C)C)C

Properties
Chemical formula	C_{30}H_{50}O
Molar mass	426.72 g/mol
Appearance	White to off-white solid
Density	~1.0 g/cm^{3} (estimated)
Solubility in water	Practically insoluble in water; soluble in ethanol, DMSO

Hazards
- Occupational safety and health (OHS/OSH)
Main hazards	Not extensively studied; handle as potentially bioactive
Flash point	Not applicable
Autoignition temperature	Not applicable
- Except where otherwise noted, data are given for materials in their standard state (at 25 °C [77 °F], 100 kPa). (what is ?) Infobox references

Tirucallol is a natural product which is encountered in some plants. Chemicallym it is a tetracyclic triterpenoid alcohol which is found in the latex of species Euphorbia lactea and the resin of Pistacia lentiscus (known as mastic tree). It is under investigation for its anti-inflammatory and antioxidant properties.

== Structure and properties ==
This compound is a tetracyclic triterpenoid alcohol which has a hydroxyl group in the 3β-position. It is actually produced in plants through the mevalonate pathway, which is involved in the formation of squalene, as well as in other triterpenes.

Some of the biological activities of tirucallol include those: anti-inflammatory effects, and effects on endothelial cells.

== Applications ==
Pharmaceutical research has shown its anti-inflammatory activity that can be useful in the development of new treatments. In addition, nutraceutical research has shown that as a mastic gum, can contribute to some of biological effects.
