= Obtusifoliol =

Identifiers
CAS Number	16910-32-0
3D model (JSmol)	Interactive image
ChEBI	CHEBI:17791
ChEMBL	ChEMBL1978954
ChemSpider	167937
KEGG	C01943
PubChem CID	5047
UNII	3RH57E39ER
CompTox Dashboard (EPA)	DTXSID60168650
- InChI: InChI=1S/C30H50O/c1-19(2)20(3)9-10-21(4)23-13-17-30(8)26-12-11-24-22(5)27(31)15-16-28(24,6)25(26)14-18-29(23,30)7/h19,21-24,27,31H,3,9-18H2,1-2,4-8H3/t21-,22+,23-,24?,27+,28+,29-,30+/m1/s1 Key: MMNYKQIDRZNIKT-YLANKJTKSA-N; InChI=1S/C30H50O/c1-19(2)20(3)9-10-21(4)23-13-17-30(8)26-12-11-24-22(5)27(31)15-16-28(24,6)25(26)14-18-29(23,30)7/h19,21-24,27,31H,3,9-18H2,1-2,4-8H3/t21-,22+,23-,24?,27+,28+,29-,30+/m1/s1 Key: MMNYKQIDRZNIKT-YLANKJTKSA-N
- SMILES: C[C@@H]1[C@H](CC[C@]2(C1CCC3=C2CC[C@]4([C@]3(CC[C@@H]4[C@H](C)CCC(=C)C(C)C)C)C)C)O

Properties
Chemical formula	C_{30}H_{50}O
Molar mass	426.729 g·mol^{−1}
- Except where otherwise noted, data are given for materials in their standard state (at 25 °C [77 °F], 100 kPa). Infobox references

Obtusifoliol is a metabolic intermediate of sterols made by certain fungi. It can be converted to delta8,14-sterol by the enzyme ERG11 (CYP51F1).
