= Lanosterol =

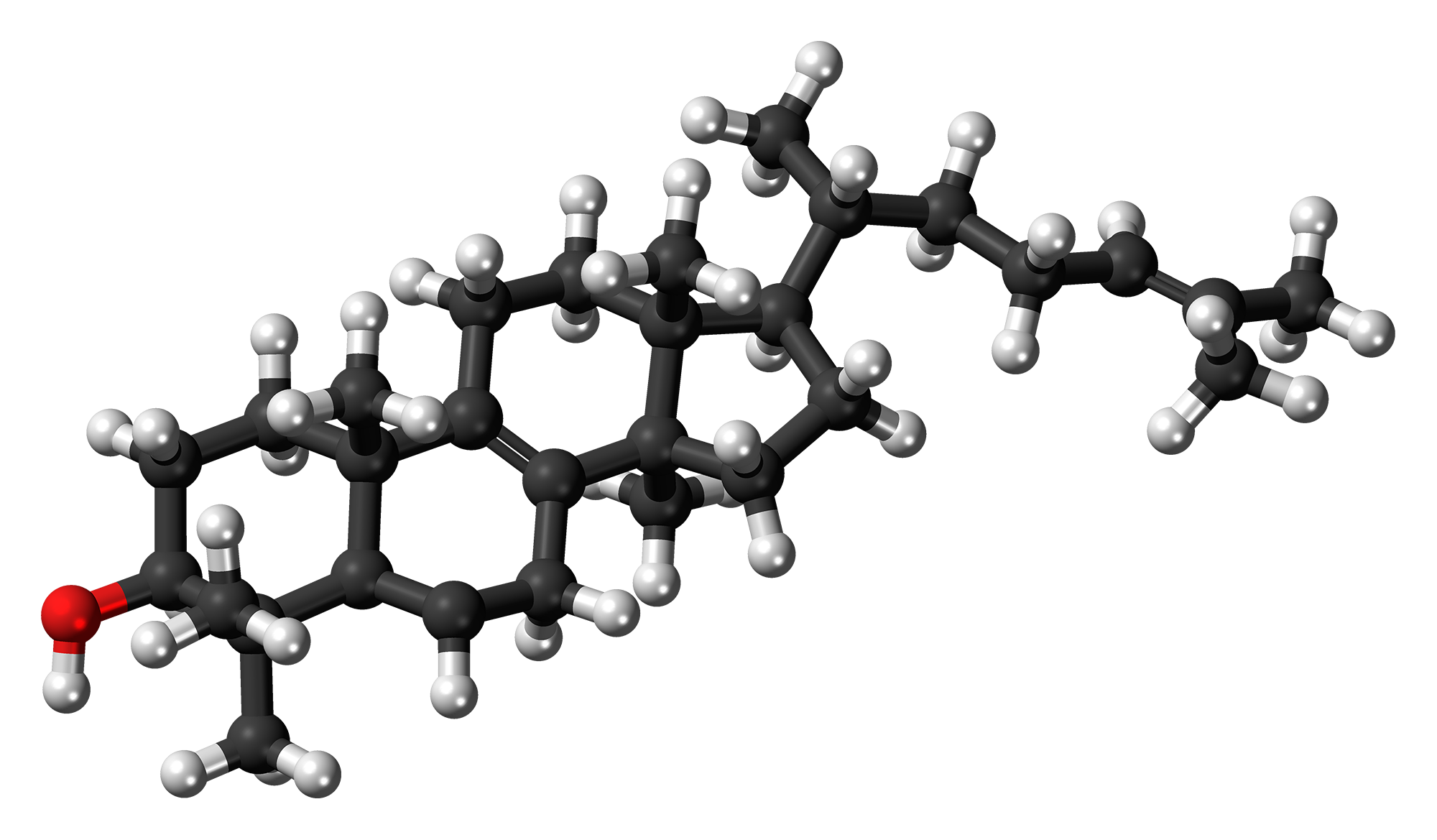

Names
- IUPAC name Lanosta-8,24-dien-3β-ol
- Systematic IUPAC name (1R,3aR,5aR,7S,9aS,11aR)-3a,6,6,9a,11a-Pentamethyl-1-[(2R)-6-methylhept-5-en-2-yl]-2,3,3a,4,5,5a,6,7,8,9,9a,10,11,11a-tetradecahydro-1H-cyclopenta[a]phenanthren-7-ol

Identifiers
CAS Number	79-63-0
3D model (JSmol)	Interactive image
Beilstein Reference	2226449
ChEBI	CHEBI:16521
ChEMBL	ChEMBL225111
ChemSpider	216175
DrugBank	DB03696
ECHA InfoCard	100.001.105
EC Number	201-214-9
IUPHAR/BPS	2746
KEGG	C01724
MeSH	Lanosterol
PubChem CID	246983
UNII	1J05Z83K3M
CompTox Dashboard (EPA)	DTXSID1040744
- InChI: InChI=1S/C30H50O/c1-20(2)10-9-11-21(3)22-14-18-30(8)24-12-13-25-27(4,5)26(31)16-17-28(25,6)23(24)15-19-29(22,30)7/h10,21-22,25-26,31H,9,11-19H2,1-8H3/t21-,22-,25+,26+,28-,29-,30+/m1/s1 Key: CAHGCLMLTWQZNJ-BQNIITSRSA-N; InChI=1/C30H50O/c1-20(2)10-9-11-21(3)22-14-18-30(8)24-12-13-25-27(4,5)26(31)16-17-28(25,6)23(24)15-19-29(22,30)7/h10,21-22,25-26,31H,9,11-19H2,1-8H3/t21-,22-,25+,26+,28-,29-,30+/m1/s1 Key: CAHGCLMLTWQZNJ-BQNIITSRBP
- SMILES: O[C@H]1CC[C@@]2(C)[C@@H](CCC3=C2CC[C@@]4(C)[C@@]3(C)CC[C@@H]4[C@@H](CC/C=C(C)/C)C)C1(C)C

Properties
Chemical formula	C_{30}H_{50}O
Molar mass	426.71 g/mol
Melting point	138 to 140 °C (280 to 284 °F; 411 to 413 K)
- Except where otherwise noted, data are given for materials in their standard state (at 25 °C [77 °F], 100 kPa). verify (what is ?) Infobox references

Lanosterol is a tetracyclic triterpenoid from which all animal and fungal steroids are derived. By contrast, plant steroids are produced via cycloartenol. Lanosterol takes its name from lanolin, a waxy substance in sheep's wool from which it was first isolated in 1930. In the eyes of vertebrates, lanosterol is a natural constituent, having a role in maintaining health of the lens. Lanosterol is the precursor to cholesterol and sex hormones.

== Biosynthesis ==
The biosynthesis of lanosterol has been intensively investigated.

Description	Illustration	Enzyme
Two molecules of farnesyl pyrophosphate condense with reduction by NADPH to form squalene		squalene synthase
Squalene is oxidized to 2,3-oxidosqualene (squalene epoxide)		squalene monooxygenase
2,3-Oxidosqualene is converted to a protosterol cation and finally to lanosterol		lanosterol synthase
(step 2)		(step 2)

Elaboration of lanosterol under enzyme catalysis leads to other steroids. 14-Demethylation of lanosterol by CYP51 eventually yields cholesterol.

Simplified version of the lanosterol synthesis pathway with the intermediates isopentenyl pyrophosphate (IPP), dimethylallyl pyrophosphate (DMAPP), geranyl pyrophosphate (GPP), and squalene shown. Some intermediates are omitted.

== Research as an eye drop supplement ==
As a molecule naturally enriched in the eye lens, lanosterol is a component involved in maintenance of lens clarity. Its proposed mechanism of action is to inhibit the aggregation of crystallin proteins, which contribute to the clouding of vision by forming cataracts.

Lanosterol is under research for its potential as a therapeutic additive in eye drops to inhibit the aggregation of crystallin proteins and dissolve cataracts. However, supplemental lanosterol in eye drops appears to have limited solubility and poor bioavailability in the eye, and has not proved effective for inhibiting cataracts, as of 2020.

== See also ==
- Cycloartenol
- CYP51
- Other tetracyclic triterpenes: cycloartenol, euphol, tirucallol, and cucurbitacin.
