= Cycloartenol =

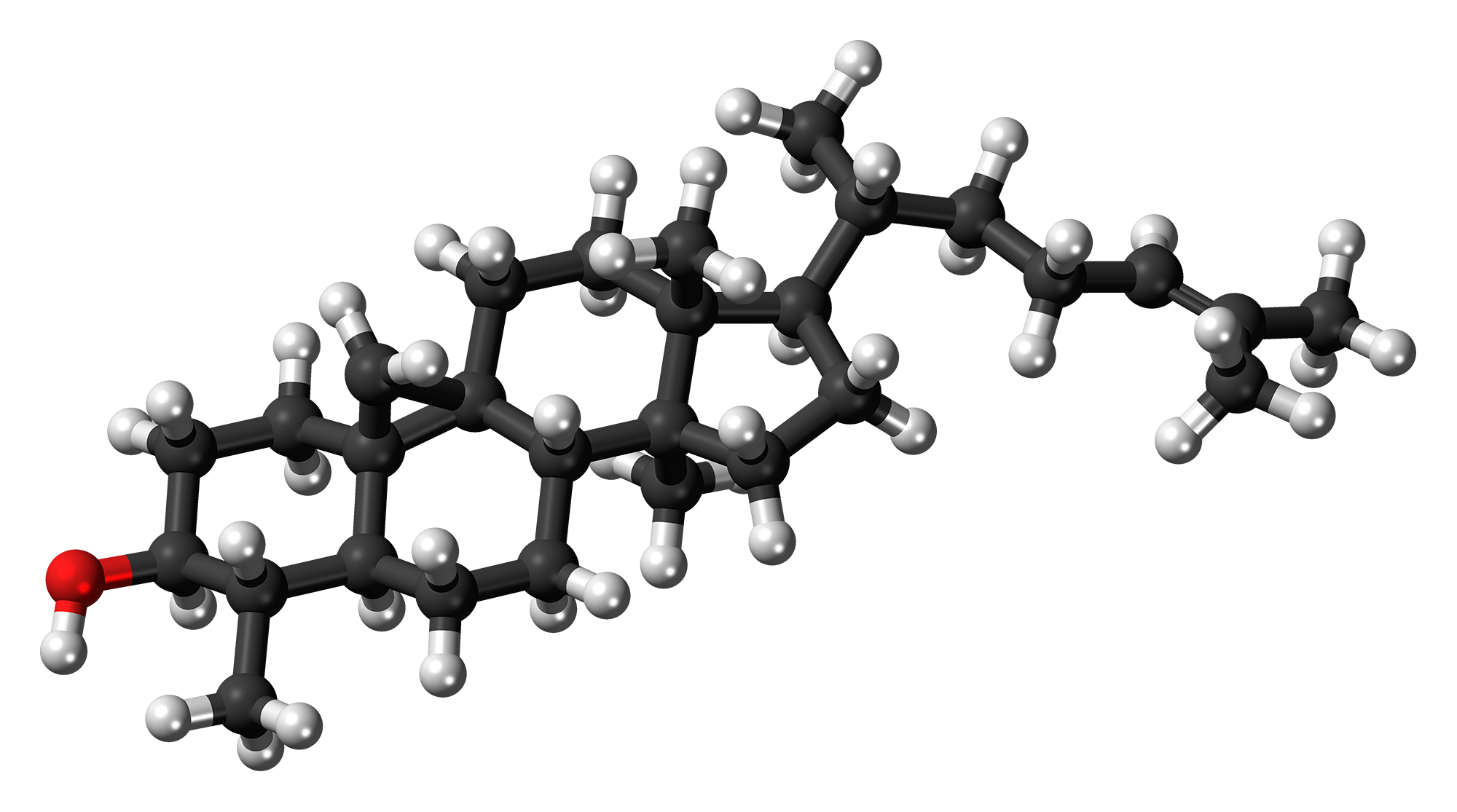

Names
- IUPAC name 9,19-Cyclo-9β-lanost-24-en-3β-ol
- Systematic IUPAC name (1R,3aS,3bS,5aR,7S,9aR,10aS,12aR)-3a,6,6,12a-Tetramethyl-1-[(2R)-6-methylhept-5-en-2-yl]tetradecahydro-2H,10H-cyclopenta[a]cyclopropa[e]phenanthren-7-ol
- Other names 9β,19-cyclo-24-lanosten-3β-ol, (3β)-9,19-Cyclolanost-24-en-3-ol

Identifiers
CAS Number	469-38-5
3D model (JSmol)	Interactive image; Interactive image
ChEBI	CHEBI:17030
ChemSpider	16788581
PubChem CID	92110
UNII	YU32VE82N3
CompTox Dashboard (EPA)	DTXSID60894760
- InChI: InChI=1S/C30H50O/c1-20(2)9-8-10-21(3)22-13-16-28(7)24-12-11-23-26(4,5)15-14-25(31)30(23)19-29(24,30)18-17-27(22,28)6/h14,20-24,31H,8-13,15-19H2,1-7H3/t21-,22-,23+,24+,27-,28+,29+,30-/m1/s1 Key: UYPYBUZTJLFCHS-DGUMGERNSA-N; InChI=1/C30H50O/c1-20(2)9-8-10-21(3)22-13-16-28(7)24-12-11-23-26(4,5)15-14-25(31)30(23)19-29(24,30)18-17-27(22,28)6/h14,20-24,31H,8-13,15-19H2,1-7H3/t21-,22-,23+,24+,27-,28+,29+,30-/m1/s1 Key: UYPYBUZTJLFCHS-DGUMGERNBH
- SMILES: CC(CCC=C(C)C)C1CCC2(C1(CCC34C2CCC5C3(C4)CCC(C5(C)C)O)C)C; CC(C)CCC[C@@H](C)[C@H]5CC[C@]1(C)[C@]5(C)CC[C@]24C[C@]34C(/O)=C\C[C@@](C)(C)[C@@H]3CC[C@@H]12

Properties
Chemical formula	C_{30}H_{50}O
Molar mass	426.72 g/mol
- Except where otherwise noted, data are given for materials in their standard state (at 25 °C [77 °F], 100 kPa). verify (what is ?) Infobox references

Cycloartenol is an important triterpenoid often found in plants. It belongs to the sterol class of steroids. It is the starting point for the synthesis of almost all plant steroids, making them chemically distinct from the steroids of opisthokonts (fungi and animals), which are, instead, produced from lanosterol.

== Synthesis ==
The biosynthesis of cycloartenol starts from the triterpenoid squalene. It is the first precursor in the biosynthesis of other stanols and sterols, referred to as phytostanols and phytosterols in photosynthetic organisms such as plants. The identities and distribution of phytostanols and phytosterols is characteristic of a plant species.
