= Triterpene =

Class of chemical compounds

Squalene: One of the most important triterpenes

Hopane: An example of a pentacyclic triterpene

Triterpenes are a class of terpenes composed of six isoprene units with the molecular formula C_{30}H_{48}; they may also be thought of as consisting of three terpene units. Animals, plants and fungi all produce triterpenes, including squalene, the precursor to all steroids.

== Structures ==
Triterpenes exist in a wide variety of structures. Nearly 200 different skeletons have been identified. These skeletons may be broadly divided according to the number of rings present. In general, pentacyclic structures (5 rings) tend to dominate.

| Number of rings | Examples |
|---|---|
| 0 | Squalene |
| 1 | Achilleol A |
| 2 | Polypodatetraene |
| 3 | Malabaricane |
| 4 | Lanostane, Cucurbitacin |
| 5 | Hopane, Oleanane, Ursolic acid |
| 6 | Chamaecydin |

Squalene is biosynthesized through the head-to-head condensation of two farnesyl pyrophosphate units. This coupling converts a pair of C15 components into a C30 product. Squalene serves as precursor for the formation of many triterpenoids, including bacterial hopanoids and eukaryotic sterols.

== Triterpenoids ==
By definition triterpenoids are triterpenes that possess heteroatoms, usually oxygen. The terms triterpene and triterpenoid often are used interchangeably.

Triterpenoids possess a rich chemistry and pharmacology with several pentacyclic motifs. Lupane, oleanane and ursane show particular promise as anti-cancer agents.

=== Steroids ===
Steroids feature a cucurbitane core, although in practice they are biosynthesised from either lanosterol (animals and fungi) or cycloartenol (plants) via the cyclization of squalene. Steroids have two principal biological functions, being either key components of cell membranes or signaling molecules that activate steroid hormone receptors. Important sub-classes include sterols and cucurbitacins.

=== Triterpenoid saponins ===
Triterpenoid saponins are triterpenes which belong to the saponin group of compounds, making them triterpenoid glycosides. They are produced by plants as part of their self-defense mechanism with important sub-classes including ginsenosides and eleutherosides.
