= Dammarene =

Chemical compound

Dammar-24-ene

Dammarenes are derivatives of dammaranes that have a double bond.

These compounds are often composed of saponins; examples include Protopanaxadiol and triol, Dammarenediol I and II.

Dammerendiol I

Dammerendiol II

== See also ==
- Dammarenediol II synthase
