= Yunnan Baiyao =

Proprietary traditional Chinese medicine

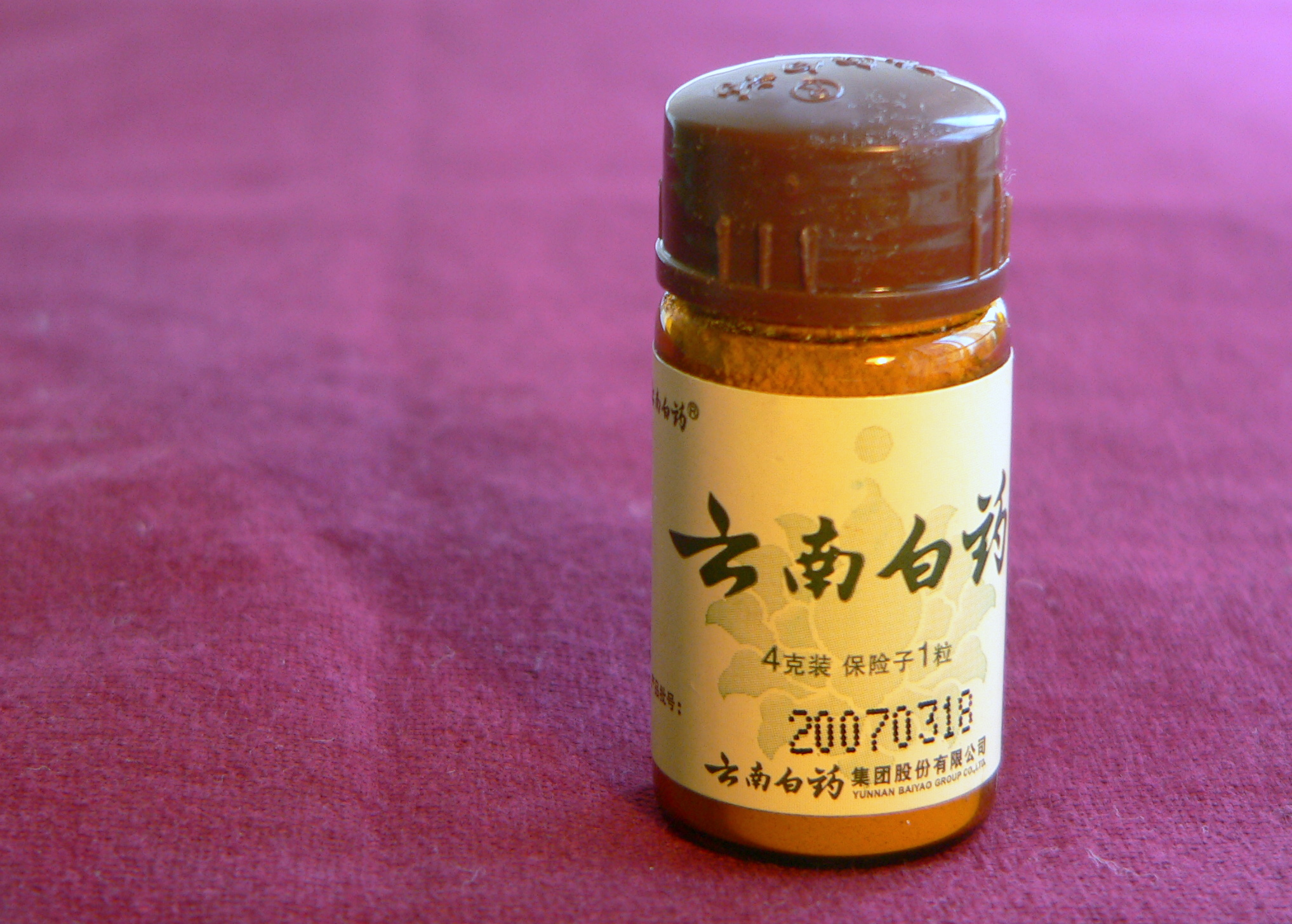
Yunnan Baiyao in the traditional powder form. 4 g bottle, with one 'insurance pill' – a red pill of a different composition supposedly reserved for heavier trauma.

Yunnan Baiyao (or Yunnan Paiyao; simplified Chinese: 云南白药; traditional Chinese: 雲南白藥; pinyin: Yúnnán Báiyào; lit. 'Yunnan White Drug') is a proprietary traditional Chinese medicine marketed and used as an alternative hemostatic product in both human and veterinary alternative medicine. The safety and efficacy of Yunnan Baiyao has not been assessed or established by the FDA, the European Medicines Agency, or the Australian Therapeutic Goods Administration. There is limited evidence regarding its effectiveness in preventing and treating hemorrhagic and pathological conditions in both humans and animals via oral administration. In a limited number of human studies of small sample sizes, administration of Yunnan Baiyao has been shown to correlate with "reduced perioperative bleeding as well as bleeding in various ulcerative–hemorrhagic conditions". It has become popular particularly for animals with hemangiosarcoma. There are multiple routes of drug administration. Yunnan Baiyao is sold in powder, tincture, plaster, paste, aerosol, or tablet form. The medicine, developed by Qu Huangzhang in 1902, is designated as one of two Class-1 protected traditional Chinese medicines, which gives it 20 years of trade protection in China. Yunnan Baiyao products are manufactured and distributed by a state-owned enterprise, Yunnan Baiyao Group (SZSE: 000538) in Yunnan, China.

== History ==
Yunnan Baiyao was developed by a Chinese man named Qu Huanzhang from Jiangchuan County in Yunnan Province. He had set out to explore the entire region and taste its hundreds of herbs. In 1902, he formulated "Qu Huanzhang Panacea," which became Yunnan Baiyao ("White medicine from Yunnan") In the Battle of Taierzhuang of 1938 (between Chinese and Japanese forces), Qu Huanzhang donated more than 30,000 bottles of Yunnan Baiyao to the Chinese National Revolutionary Army, supposedly saving the lives of many soldiers.

As an indication of its value, it is noted that during the 1940s, army commander Wu Xuexian was seriously injured in his right leg. The French hospital in Kunming (capital of Yunnan) recommended amputation to save Wu's life. Wu turned to Qu for help, and to everyone's surprise, recovered without the need for an amputation. Yunnan Baiyao gained the reputation as a miracle remedy. After the death of Qu, his wife, Liao Lanying, donated the secret prescription to the government.

In 1935, pharmacist Qu Huanzhang registered a trademark using his own image. This was Yunnan Baiyao's first attempt at intellectual property (IP) protection. Qu's wife Liao Lanying donated the Yunnan Baiyao recipe in 1956 to the Chinese government. Large-scale production of Yunnan Baiyao began. The Yunnan Baiyao Factory was established in 1971, but the company did not focus on IP protection until the late-1990s, when counterfeit products began affecting the company's business. During this period it registered a series of similar trademarks, including "Yunfeng" and "Yunnan Baiyao." In 2004, the brand was valued at 2.18 billion yuan (US$269 million), ranking 263rd in the World Economic Forum and the World Brand Lab's list of the top 500 Chinese brands.

=== Patents ===
In the years prior to 2005, the company spent nearly 1 million yuan (US$123,300) on patent registration, industrialization of patent products, and technological innovation. The company applied for three invention patents in 2002. The number of patents reached 14 in 2004. As of October 2005, the company has applied for 36 invention patents and 40 design patents.

== Formula ==
The formula of and production processes surrounding Yunnan Baiyao are trade secrets.

The company website says that the steroid progesterone is in the formula, in addition to several saponins, alkaloids, and calcium phosphate – all components of Chinese yam. Protopanaxadiol and panaxatriol, sapogenins found in ginseng (Panax ginseng) and notoginseng (Panax pseudoginseng), have been detected in Yunnan Baiyao powder formulations through capillary supercritical fluid chromatography. Yunnan Baiyao packaging indicates it should not be used with alcohol or when pregnant.

Under the "Law on Guarding State Secrets", the formula as well as the production processes regarding Yunnan Baiyao are considered secret and possess the longest period of product proprietary secrecy protection of four levels of secrecy under Chinese trade law. As a result, Yunnan Baiyao's exact ingredients are not printed on its packaging in China, and its production process was not disclosed. Some of the Yunnan Baiyao's products are sold in the US as diet supplements. According to FDA regulations, all diet supplements sold in the US market must list their ingredients on the package and report them to relevant authorities. Officials from the Yunnan Baiyao Group, the exclusive producer of Yunnan Baiyao, denied to Xinhua News Agency that there is a double standard in Yunnan Baiyao's secret-protection policy, and that ingredients are only reported to drug authorities. "Whoever disclosed the ingredients should be held legally liable," Huang Wushuang, an expert on intellectual property rights at East China University of Political Science and Law, said.

=== Chinese disclosures ===
Paris is mentioned as a major ingredient of Yunnan Baiyao in a 2002 paper on biodiversity in Yunnan province.

In 2014, Yunnan Baiyao amended the labeling of its Chinese products to add a warning regarding its use of Aconitum plant, which contains the alkaloid toxin aconitine. This substance has analgesic properties, but is mainly known for being a highly potent poison.

=== Purported FDA ingredient list ===
In December 2010, purported lists of ingredients were published on the websites of Amazon.com and the Food and Drug Administration (FDA). The list containing eight supposedly active ingredients of a liquid form of the drug were found in a 2002 document published on the FDA website that contains correspondence between the FDA and a distributor of the drug. Ingredient lists were also present in the product information sections for the powdered and capsule forms of the drug on Amazon.com. The corporation denies that the list is the secret formula.

The 2010 FDA document listed notoginseng (Panax pseudoginseng) root, borneol crystal from Dryobalanops aromatica, Boea clarkeana entire plant, Inula coppa root, Complanatum (Lycopodium complanatum) rhizome, Chinese yam (Dioscorea opposita) rhizome, galanga (Alpinia officinarum) rhizome, cranebill (Erodium stephanianum) aerial parts, camphor crystal from Cinnamomum camphora, and peppermint (Menta haplocalyx) leaves as active ingredients in Yunnan Baiyao products.

A largely matching list of ingredients with proportions, allegedly from a bottle of Yunnan Baiyao powder bought in the USA, was published in science writer Fang Zhouzi's blog in 2009.

=== Taiwanese replica ===
In 1966, an ROC army hospital director by the name of Wu Junchang (吳郡昌) "happened" on a key ingredient of Yunnan Baiyao when hunting near Kaohsiung. He ended up successfully recreating the medication and selling it. Wu's formula contains 44% Paris plant, 21% notoginseng root, 12% Chinese yam rhizome, 10% Aconitum root, 6% Adenophora stricta root, 1% borneol, plus "a little" musk and dried Veratrum taliense.

== Contamination and adulteration ==
In early 2013, officials in Sichuan province banned the sale of Baiyao powders and pills over faulty and defective wrappers that led to water contamination in addition to finding products contaminated with mold.

In February 2013, the Department of Health of Hong Kong found potentially toxic undeclared aconitum alkaloids in samples of Yunnan Baiyao products, leading to a mandatory recall of products and a temporary ban on the sale of Yunnan Baiyao in the administrative regions of Hong Kong and Macau. In 2019, unauthorised Yunnan Baiyao toothpaste was recalled by Health Canada due to the presence of tranexamic acid, a prescription medication.

== Cooperation ==
The Yunnan Baiyao Group has diversified and expanded into the global pharmaceutical industry. In 2001, the company revealed an adhesive band-aid product in a joint venture with German personal care products maker Beiersdorf AG.

In 2003, 3M initiated contact with Yunnan Baiyao Group Co, Ltd. to discuss potential cooperation opportunities in the area of transdermal pharmaceutical products.

== Efficacy ==
Yunnan Baiyao products are classed as dietary supplements or new drugs by the FDA, and are not generally recognized as safe and effective for the prevention, mitigation, or treatment of wounds, pain, and hemorrhage among other conditions. The European Medicines Agency has not assessed the safety or efficacy of the product as a hemostatic. It is not listed on the Australian Register of Therapeutic Goods (ARTG) for approved sale in Australia, and the quality, safety, or efficacy of Yunnan Baiyao has not been established by the Australian Therapeutic Goods Administration.

Yunnan Baiyao demonstrates hemostatic effects, stopping the flow of blood when applied topically on open wounds.

Oral administration was shown to produce negligible results in laboratory tests. In vitro studies have suggested a theoretical benefit in the treatment of rheumatoid arthritis. Some studies have found heavy metal levels below oral tolerance levels, however the significance of this finding is not known. Multiple routes of drug administration results in varying degrees of efficacy. Topical administration has been shown to have a degree of efficacy possibly through ultrastructural changes in platelets and platelet-constituent release. The effect of Yunnan Baiyao on the coagulation biochemical system has not been fully elucidated, but it has been suggested that the expression of glycoproteins on platlets plays a role.

One in vitro study found that Yunnan Baiyao causes dose- and time- dependent hemangiosarcoma cell death through initiation of caspase-mediated cell apoptosis in a canine cell cancer line which supports future studies involving Yunnan Baiyao. It is reported to be well-tolerated in dogs. Another study found no significant difference from placebo regarding buccal mucosal bleeding time, prothrombin time, activated partial thromboplastin time, and clotting parameters in canines. There was no high-quality evidence supporting the use of Yunnan Baiyao for either rheumatoid arthritis or hemangiosarcoma available in publicly reported scientific literature as of 2019.

Two randomized double-blind studies showed the administration of yunnan baiyao produced effects on intraoperative blood loss, producing "a reduction in intraoperative blood loss in bimaxillary orthognathic surgery", and that it "reduced the amount of intraoperative bleeding of cervical open-door laminoplasty". Another showed that perioperative oral administration "can effectively reduce the magnitude of facial swelling in bimaxillary orthognathic surgery".

Concerns include lack of quality control, manufacturing regulations, and standardization in China.

== Market ==
=== Fields ===
Yunnan Baiyao is focused primarily on diversification of the higher-end market segment for pharmaceuticals. Following the success of its adhesive bandages, the Chinese firm added toothpaste to its product line-up. Sales revenue from the Yunnan Baiyao toothpaste grossed 500 million yuan in 2008, making it the fifth most popular toothpaste in China in terms of sales revenue.

=== Product research ===
Over the five years prior to 2016, the revenue of the Yunnan Baiyao Group doubled to $3.4 billion in 2016, while net profits increased by 140% to $440 million. Market capitalisation rose by over 250% since the end of 2011, to more than $13 billion.

Starting around 2005, Yunnan Baiyao expanded further into consumer products including patches and shampoos. Adhesive bandages with Yunnan Baiyao powder are marketed under the slogan "It heals faster with Baiyao" (云南白药创可贴, 伤口好得快).

== See also ==
- Artemisinin
- Artesunate
- Dihydroartemisinin
- Project 523
- Tu Youyou
