= (S)-squalene-2,3-epoxide hydro-lyase =

(S)-squalene-2,3-epoxide hydro-lyase may refer to:

- Arabidiol synthase, an enzyme
- Dammarenediol II synthase, an enzyme
- Lupan-3beta,20-diol synthase, an enzyme
