= C30H52O4 =

The molecular formula C_{30}H_{52}O_{4} (molar mass: 476.73 g/mol, exact mass: 476.3866 u) may refer to:

- Panaxatriol
- Protopanaxatriol (PPT)
