= Pseudoginsenoside F11 =

Names
- IUPAC name (24R)-3β,12β,25-Trihydroxy-20,24-epoxydammaran-6α-yl α-L-rhamnopyranosyl-(1→2)-β-D-glucopyranoside
- Systematic IUPAC name (2S,3R,4R,5R,6S)-2-{[(2R,3R,4S,5S,6R)-1-({(1S,3aR,3bR,5S,5aR,7S,9aR,9bR,11R,11aR)-7,11-Dihydroxy-1-[(2S,5R)-5-(2-hydroxypropan-2-yl)-2-methyloxolan-2-yl]-3a,3b,6,6,9a-pentamethylhexadecahydro-5H-cyclopenta[a]phenanthren-5-yl}oxy)-4,5-dihydroxy-6-(hydroxymethyl)oxan-3-yl]oxy}-6-methyloxane-3,4,5-triol
- Other names Ginsenoside A1

Identifiers
CAS Number	69884-00-0
3D model (JSmol)	Interactive image
ChemSpider	10264342
ECHA InfoCard	100.208.747
EC Number	683-240-4
PubChem CID	21633072
CompTox Dashboard (EPA)	DTXSID00275690
- InChI: InChI=1S/C42H72O14/c1-19-28(46)30(48)32(50)35(52-19)55-33-31(49)29(47)23(18-43)54-36(33)53-22-17-41(8)24(39(6)13-11-25(45)37(2,3)34(22)39)16-21(44)27-20(10-14-40(27,41)7)42(9)15-12-26(56-42)38(4,5)51/h19-36,43-51H,10-18H2,1-9H3/t19-,20-,21+,22-,23+,24+,25-,26+,27-,28-,29+,30+,31-,32+,33+,34-,35-,36+,39+,40+,41+,42-/m0/s1 Key: JBGYSAVRIDZNKA-NKECSCAMSA-N
- SMILES: C[C@H]1[C@@H]([C@H]([C@H]([C@@H](O1)O[C@@H]2[C@H]([C@@H]([C@H](O[C@H]2O[C@H]3C[C@@]4([C@H](C[C@H]([C@H]5[C@]4(CC[C@@H]5[C@@]6(CC[C@@H](O6)C(C)(C)O)C)C)O)[C@@]7([C@@H]3C([C@H](CC7)O)(C)C)C)C)CO)O)O)O)O)O

Properties
Chemical formula	C_{42}H_{72}O_{14}
Molar mass	801.024 g·mol^{−1}
- Except where otherwise noted, data are given for materials in their standard state (at 25 °C [77 °F], 100 kPa). Infobox references

Pseudoginsenoside F11 is a chemical natural product found in American ginseng (Panax quinquefolius) but not in Asian ginseng (Panax ginseng), although it has similar properties to the Asian ginseng compound ginsenoside Rf. The molecule is a triterpenoid saponin member of the dammarane family and contains a four-ring rigid skeleton. Compounds in the ginsenoside family are found almost exclusively in plants of the genus Panax. A wide variety of difficult-to-characterize in vitro effects have been reported for the compounds in isolation. Pseudoginsenoside F11 and its derivatives are sometimes referred to as having an ocotillol-type skeleton structure.

Studies in mice have identified antagonistic effects on the actions of other well-characterized drugs, such as scopolamine, morphine, and methamphetamine.
