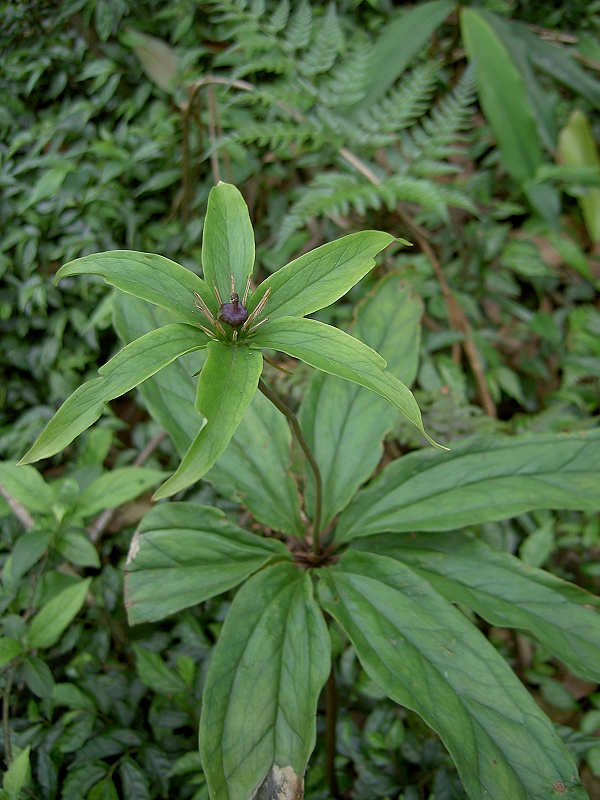

Scientific classification
- Kingdom: Plantae
- Clade: Tracheophytes
- Clade: Angiosperms
- Clade: Monocots
- Order: Liliales
- Family: Melanthiaceae
- Genus: Paris
- Species: P. polyphylla

Binomial name
- Paris polyphylla Sm.

Synonyms
- Synonymy: Daiswa polyphylla (Sm.) Raf.; Paris daiswus Buch.-Ham. ex D.Don; Paris debeauxii H.Lév.; Paris biondii Pamp.; Paris taitungensis S.S.Ying; Paris kwantungensis R.H.Miao; Paris chinensis Franch., syn of var. chinensis; Daiswa chinensis (Franch.) Takht., syn of var. chinensis; Paris formosana Hayata, syn of var. chinensis; Paris brachysepala Pamp., syn of var. chinensis; Paris bockiana Diels, syn of var. stenophylla; Paris lancifolia Hayata, syn of var. stenophylla; Paris hamifer H.Lév., syn of var. stenophylla; Paris arisanensis Hayata, syn of var. stenophylla; Daiswa bockiana (Diels) Takht., syn of var. stenophylla; Daiswa lancifolia (Hayata) Takht., syn of var. stenophylla; Paris yunnanensis Franch., syn of var. yunnanensis; Daiswa yunnanensis (Franch.) Takht., syn of var. yunnanensis; Paris christii H.Lév., syn of var. yunnanensis; Paris franchetiana H.Lév., syn of var. yunnanensis; Paris mercieri H.Lév., syn of var. yunnanensis; Paris cavaleriei H.Lév. & Vaniot, syn of var. yunnanensis; Paris gigas H.Lév. & Vaniot, syn of var. yunnanensis; Paris aprica H.Lév., syn of var. yunnanensis; Paris pinfaensis H.Lév., syn of var. yunnanensis; Paris atrata H.Lév., syn of var. yunnanensis; Daiswa birmanica Takht., syn of var. yunnanensis; Paris birmanica (Takht.) H.Li & Noltie, syn of var. yunnanensis

= Paris polyphylla =

Species of flowering plant

Paris polyphylla is a species of flowering plant native to China, the Indian subcontinent, and Indochina. It produces spider-like flowers that throw out long, thread-like, yellowish green petals throughout most of the warm summer months and into the autumn. In the fall, the flowers are followed by small, scarlet berries. It is a perennial, which slowly spreads, is fully hardy in Britain, and survives in leafy, moist soil in either complete or partial shade.

This plant usually grows up to 90 cm (3 ft) high and spreads out about 30 cm (1 ft) wide. Its leaves grow in a single whorl below a flower growing in two whorls. According to Fayaz, there can be as many as twenty-two leaves in the whorl, a number exceeded only by some Equisetum species. This same source states that the tepals can number up to fourteen.

It is used as an ornamental plant for woodland gardens or for planting under deciduous trees.

== Etymology ==
The generic name Paris is derived from the word pars, or equal, which refers to the symmetry of the plant and the multiples of four in which its foliage, flowers, and fruits grow. The specific epithet, polyphylla, means 'with many leaves'. It is also referred to as Ch'i Yeh I Chih Hua in China, meaning "seven-leaves-one-flower". Its Nepali name is Satuwa, and it is referred to as the "Love Apple" in English.

== Taxonomy ==
The genus Paris has in the past been placed in a number of different families, including a broadly defined Liliaceae and the former family Trilliaceae. In the APG III system, it is placed in the family Melanthiaceae, where it is related to the genus Trillium.

As of May 2012 the World Checklist of Selected Plant Families (WCSP) recognizes several varieties:

- Paris polyphylla var. alba – Guizhou, Hubei, Yunnan
- Paris polyphylla var. chinensis – China (Anhui, Fujian, Guangdong, Guangxi, Guizhou, Hubei, Hunan, Jiangsu, Jiangxi, Sichuan, Yunnan) Taiwan, Laos, Myanmar, Thailand, Vietnam
- Paris polyphylla var. latifolia – Anhui, Henan, Hubei, Jiangxi, Shaanxi, Shanxi
- Paris polyphylla var. nana – Sichuan
- Paris polyphylla var. panxiensis – Sichuan
- Paris polyphylla var. polyphylla – China, Himalayas, northern Indochina
- Paris polyphylla var. stenophyla – China, Bhutan, India (Assam, Sikkim), Myanmar, Nepal
- Paris polyphylla var. yunnanensis – China (Guizhou, Sichuan, Tibet, Yunnan), India (Assam), Myanmar

The Flora of China recognizes five additional varieties, three of which are placed in different species by the WCSP:

- P. polyphylla var. appendiculata = P. thibetica
- P. polyphylla var. brachystemon = P. polyphylla var. stenophyla
- P. polyphylla var. kwantungensis = P. polyphylla var. polyphylla
- P. polyphylla var. minor = P. delavayi
- P. polyphylla var. pseudothibetica = P. delavayi

== Ecology ==
=== Habitat ===
Paris polyphylla prefers to grow in forests, bamboo forests, thickets, grassy or rocky slopes and stream sides. It likes moist, damp, and shady places (such as under deciduous trees). It is said to grow at altitudes up to 3300 meters and thrives well in places with moist and humus rich soil under canopy of forest in full shade to partial shade.

Soil nutrients like organic matter, nitrogen and phosphorus were found in higher levels in areas where the plant was absent. However, the levels of phosphorus tended to be found in higher levels in areas were the plant grew.

=== Conservation and cultivation ===
Paris polyphylla Sm. (Satuwa) is one of the medicinal plants listed as vulnerable by the IUCN. Seed viability was found to be low and the seeds did not germinate in laboratory conditions even under different chemical treatments. There seems to be a need for raising awareness amongst people who live in environments in which Paris polyphylla propagates. Scientists must make known the sustainable use of the rhizome and its cultivation practice for the conservation of this plant. If some part of the rhizome containing the bud is left underground, it is thought that the plant would become more sustainable and would help in conserving its population in the future.

In a study done in Nepal, it was observed that overharvesting, unscientific collection of rhizomes, harvesting of plants before seed maturity, low viable seed production and long dormancy of seeds are the major threats to the plant's propagation.

Paris polyphylla is considered to be a traded plant and it might have become less abundant in the past decade and this could be due to deforestation.

=== Garden care ===
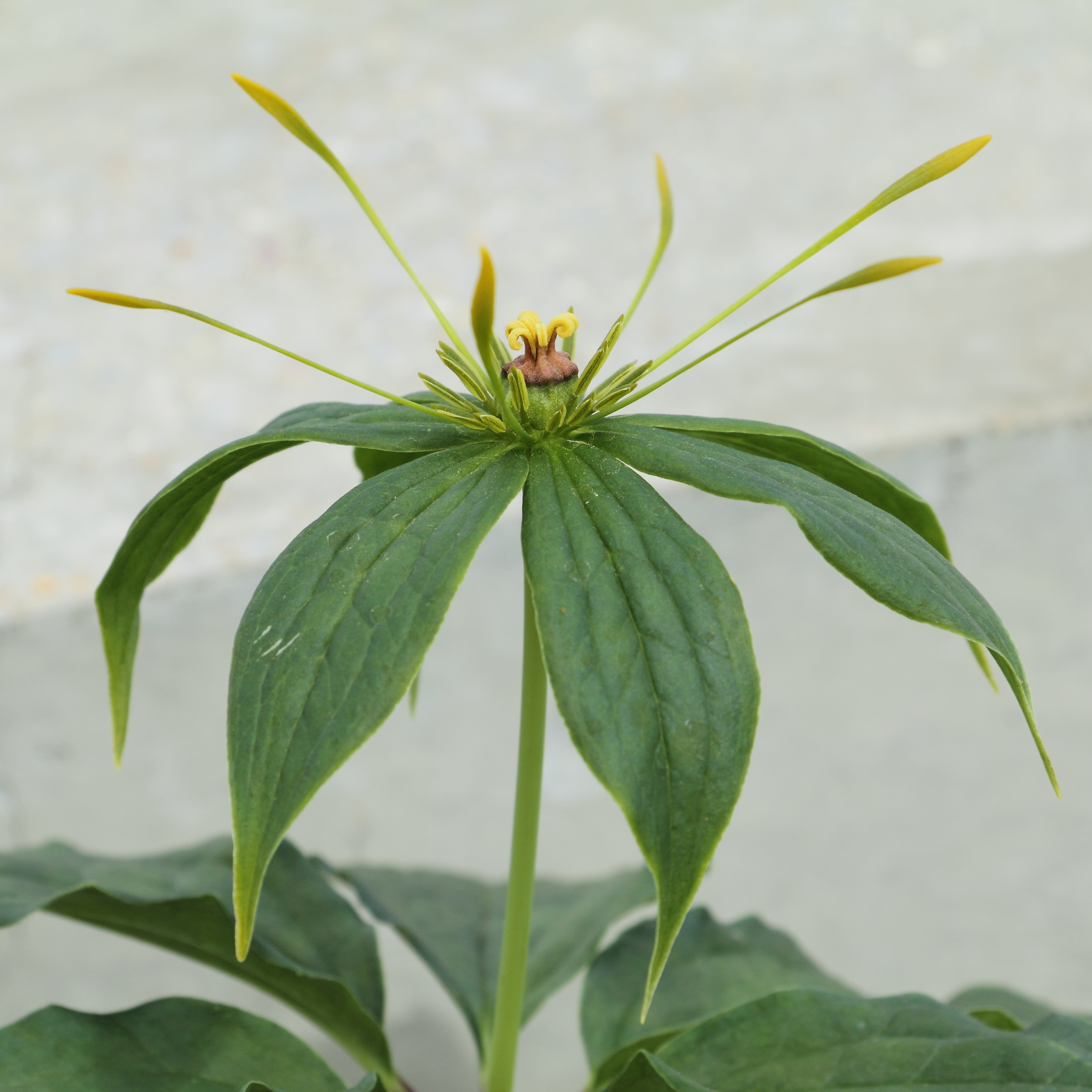
Paris polyphylla var. chinensis

Paris polyphylla plants are supposed to be planted with the pointy shoot at one end of the rhizome facing upwards. The rhizome is then supposed to be covered with around 5 cm (2 in) of humus-rich soil which should not be allowed to dry out during the summer months. In the autumn, a generous layer of mulch should be added and the plants should be left undisturbed after that so that they can increase in number year after year. Caution should be taken since if eaten raw, the leaves of P. polyphylla could be toxic, even though it can be used in many medicinal remedies.

=== Reproduction ===
In the different varieties of Paris polyphylla, there are as many stamens (usually eight) as there are outer tepals, or there could be more. Stamens have short filaments. The filaments are about 10 mm in size, while the anthers are about 12 mm. The ovary is subglobose, ribbed, one-loculed and sometimes tuberculate. The style is short with an enlarged base and purple to white in color. The capsule, which is a kind of dry fruit produced by many flowering plants, is globose and sometimes tuberculate. The plant was found to reproduce mainly by vegetative propagation in the field.

It has been observed that Paris polyphylla seeds produce primary root about seven months after sowing and then leaves about four months later in the second year. The seeds of this plant can remain dormant and this is thought to be because of changes of several endohormones, development of inhibiting substances, and the increase in material accumulation during the embryo's physiological ripening period. A single offspring is grown from a single mother plant and this led to a rapid decline in its numbers.

== Morphology ==
Plants of Paris polyphylla usually grow about 10–100 cm tall from a rhizome 1–2.5 cm thick. The leaves, which are in a whorl at the top of the stem are sessile, petiolate, lanceolate, to ovate or elliptic. The ovary is in the superior position, with numerous ovules. The fruit is a berry or berrylike capsule, in which the seeds are enclosed in a red succulent aril when ripe. The species is extremely polymorphic. A table of some characteristics of some varieties of Paris polyphylla follows.

Variety	Description
P. polyphylla var. alba	Style and apical part of ovary white
P. polyphylla var. chinensis	Anthers about twice as long as filaments
P. polyphylla var. kwantungensis (may be included in P. polyphylla var. polyphylla)	Filaments can grow to about 10 mm; stigma lobes
P. polyphylla var. latifolia	Ovary and capsule tuberculate Ovary and capsule smooth
P. polyphylla var. minor	Filaments 1–2 mm; anthers around 6 mm
P. polyphylla var. nana	Plants about 10 cm tall; free portion of anther connective inconspicuous
P. polyphylla var. polyphylla	Leaf blade oblong, elliptic, or obovate-lanceolate, 2.5-5.0 cm wide
P. polyphylla var. stenophylla	Leaf blade lanceolate to linear-lanceolate; 1.5-2.5 cm wide
P. polyphylla var. yunnanensis	Inner tepals are 3-5mm wide; distally widened sometimes; narrowly spatulate

=== Leaf structures ===
Leaves are found in a whorl of 4 to 9 leaves and they are petioled (4–6 cm), oblong, or lanceolate, acuminate. The base of the leaf is rounded to cuneate in shape. In variety polyphylla, the leaves are 2.5–5.0 cm wide. The dull-green leaves contain three primary veins and spread out in a horizontal whorl at the top of the stem. The leaves are known to have a narcotic odor.

=== Stem and roots ===
Rhizomes, which are stems of plants that usually grow underground and send out roots and shoots from their nodes, grow in a creeping manner. The stem grows about a foot high and it is simple, erect, smooth, round and naked, except at the top. It is relatively thin.

=== Flowers and fruits ===
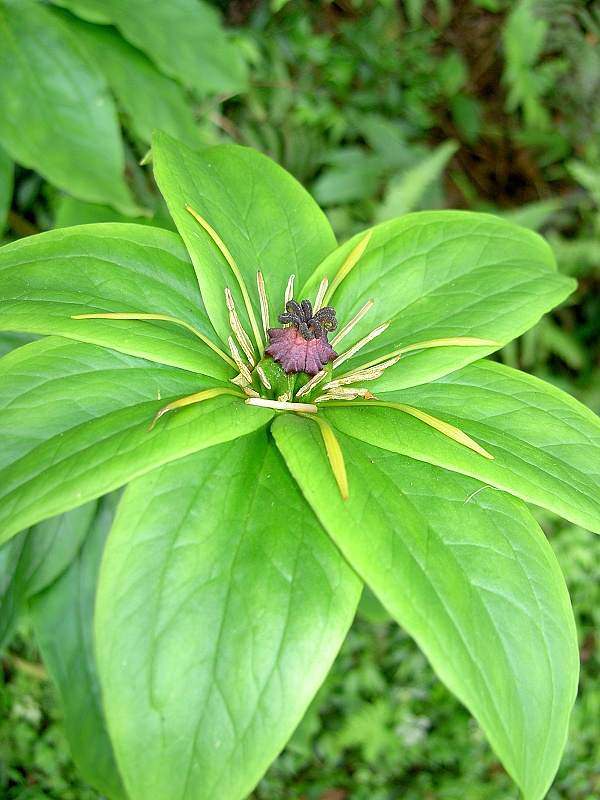
The tepals of Paris polyphylla

The tepals, which are elements of the perianth that includes the petals and the sepals, are usually 3–5 mm in length, widen distally, and are narrowly spatulate. This is true of the variety yunnanensis. The outer tepals are green or yellow-green, narrowly ovate-lanceolate to lanceolate, while the inner tepals are usually yellow-green, narrowly linear, and are shorter or longer than outer ones (about 1.5 mm long). In the variety polyphylla, the inner tepals are 1–2 mm wide and are slightly longer than the outer ones. In this variety, the bisexual flower is solitary and is produced on an erect angular peduncle and it is about 2.5 cm long. The calyx consists of four lanceolate green leaves, while the corolla consists of four linear acute ones, of a similar color. Both the calyx and the corolla remain on the plant until the fruit ripens. The fruits are purplish-black four-celled berries, which contain, in each cell, six or eight seeds in a double series. The seeds are surrounded by a red, succulent aril, which will grow in the Spring.

=== Paris polyphylla var. brachystemon ===
The specimens referred to as var. brachystemon (or var. stenophylla) are usually smaller in their plant structures. Their leaves are narrower, attenuate at the base, and they have a very short petiole. They are often dark green and whitish along the veins and underneath they are dark purplish in color. Some specimens closely resemble P. marmorata, but their anthers are oblong and 3 mm long, while some other specimens have longer anthers, longer sepals and petals, and more distinct petioles which show intermediate characteristics between P. marmorata and P. polyphylla.

== Genetics ==
Both diploids (2n = 10 + 0 − 2B) and tetraploids (2n = 20 + 0 − 2B) have been found in Paris polyphylla. The diploid variety has been reported in Simla and northern Thailand. P. formosana from Formosa which is considered as conspecific with P. polyphylla is also diploid.

== In folk medicine of Nepal ==
Paris polyphylla has been used by local inhabitants of Nepal traditionally since ancient times. They use it primarily for fevers and headaches, burns, wounds, and many livestock disease mainly to neutralize poisons.

People harvest the rhizome of the Paris polyphylla at fruiting season (October), just before the plant dies because the plant is abundant at this time. However, the local people, especially the Gurungs, believe that the plant harvested on Tuesdays of mid April (i.e. last Tuesday of Chaitra month) will be more effective as a medicine than those harvested at any other season.

There used to be a large scale collection and trading of the rhizomes; they were traded to Pokhara city or Kathmandu. However, no trade of Paris polyphylla occurs at present because it is banned for commercial collection as it falls under the Annapurna Conservation Area.

== See also ==
- Paris japonica
- Paris quadrifolia
