= BPY =

BPY may refer to:

- 2,2'-Bipyridine
- The ISO/FDIS 639-3 code for Bishnupriya Manipuri language
- Beta-amyrin synthase, an enzyme
