= PNY (disambiguation) =

PNY is an American manufacturer of computer components.

PNY or pny may also refer to:

- PNY, an alternative name of the enzyme Beta-amyrin synthase
- PNY, the IATA airport code for the Pondicherry Airport
- pny, the ISO 639-3 code for the Pinyin language
