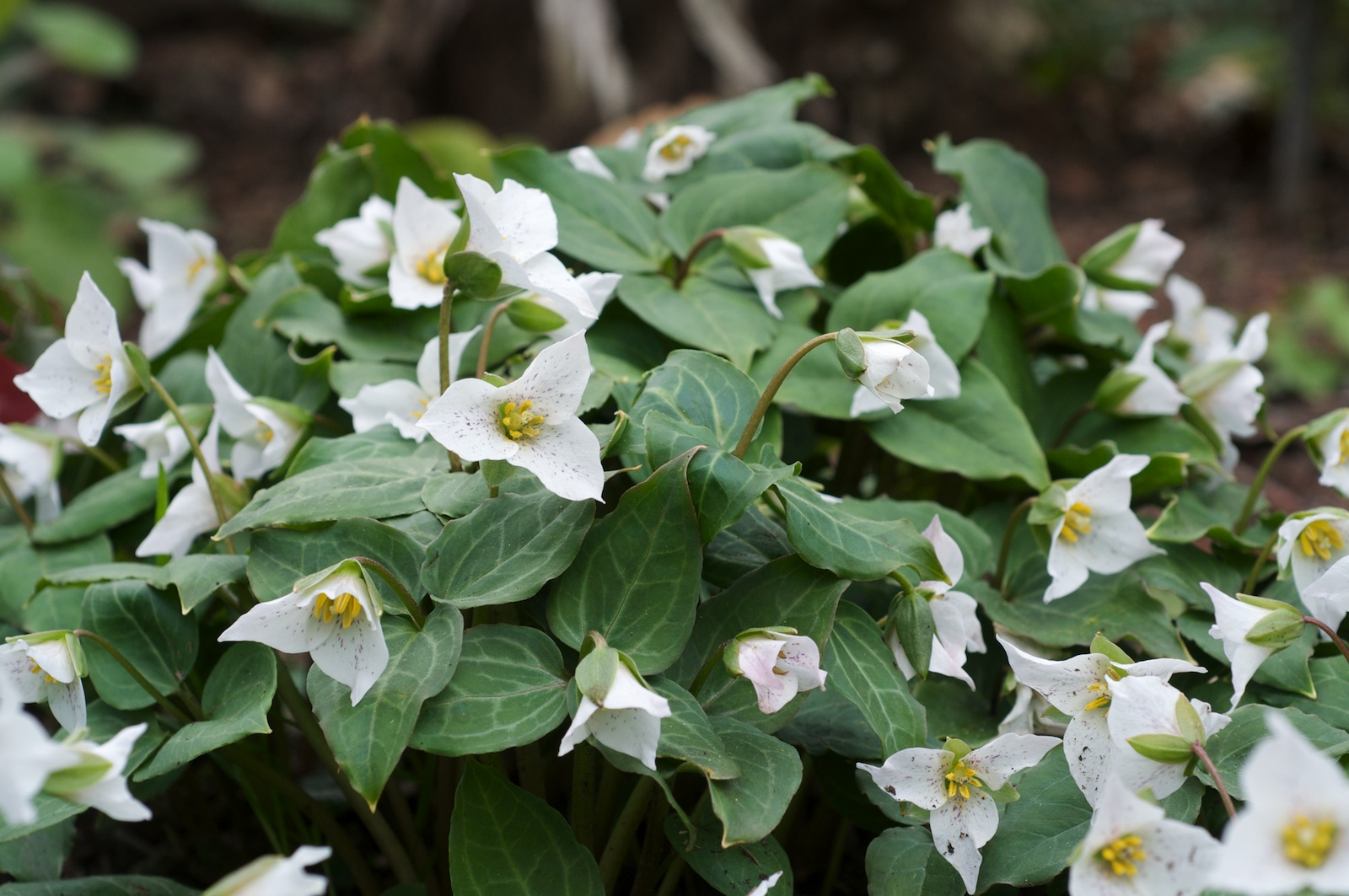
- Pseudotrillium rivale

Conservation status
- Vulnerable (NatureServe)

Scientific classification
- Kingdom: Plantae
- Clade: Tracheophytes
- Clade: Angiosperms
- Clade: Monocots
- Order: Liliales
- Family: Melanthiaceae
- Tribe: Parideae
- Genus: Pseudotrillium; S.B.Farmer
- Species: P. rivale

Binomial name
- Pseudotrillium rivale (S.Watson) S.B.Farmer

Synonyms
- Trillium rivale S.Watson

= Pseudotrillium =

Genus of flowering plants

Pseudotrillium is a monotypic genus in the bunchflower family Melanthiaceae. Its sole species, the flowering plant Pseudotrillium rivale, is commonly known as the brook wakerobin. It is endemic to the Siskiyou Mountains of southern Oregon and northern California. The Latin specific epithet rivale means "growing by streams", a reference to a preferred habitat.

== Description ==
Pseudotrillium rivale is a perennial, herbaceous, flowering plant that persists by means of an underground rhizome. In general appearance, it is similar to a Trillium (and at one time, it belonged to that genus). It has a whorl of three bracts (leaves) and a single trimerous flower with three sepals, three petals, two whorls of three stamens each, and three carpels (fused into a single ovary with three stigmas). It differs from Trillium in that it has spotted petals, leathery leaves with a cordate base, and a continuously elongating pedicel. At the onset of anthesis, the pedicel rises above the leaves, but once the flower is pollinated, the pedicel elongates and declines below the leaves.

Pseudotrillium rivale grows up to 20 cm (7.9 in) tall. The lance-shaped leaves are up to 11 cm (4.3 in) long with leaf stalks (called petioles) 1 to 3 cm (0.4 to 1.2 in) in length. The leaves are glossy blue-green with conspicuous silvery veins. The plant has a nodding, non-fragrant flower on a pedicel 2.5 to 11 cm (1.0 to 4.3 in) long. The flower has green sepals and pink-blushed white petals up to 3 cm (1.2 in) long and 2 cm (0.8 in) wide.

== Taxonomy ==
Pseudotrillium rivale was first described as Trillium rivale by American botanist Sereno Watson in 1885. Its type specimen was collected in 1880 at Big Flat in the Siskiyou Mountains, thirty miles east of Crescent City, California. Watson compared the new species to the eastern Trillium nivale, "which it much resembles in habit." Presumably he was referring to the tendency of the pedicel to decline below the leaves after pollination, a common habit of both species.

Based on morphology and molecular phylogenetic evidence, Trillium rivale was segregated into a monotypic genus by Susan B. Farmer in 2002. For this purpose, Farmer simultaneously described the taxa Pseudotrillium and Pseudotrillium rivale. As of March 2023, the name Pseudotrillium rivale (S.Watson) S.B.Farmer is widely recognized.

Pseudotrillium is a member of tribe Parideae. It is sister to the remainder of Parideae, a clade that includes Paris and Trillium. Based on molecular phylogenetic studies, Pseudotrillium rivale is the first diverging (basal) branch of Parideae, a result that is well supported. Historically, studies that omit this taxon have given strikingly different results, suggesting that "Pseudotrillium could hold the key to phylogenetic studies" of Parideae.

== Distribution ==
Pseudotrillium rivale is endemic to the Siskiyou Mountains of southern Oregon (Josephine, Coos, Douglas, and Curry counties) and northern California (Siskiyou and Del Norte counties), usually on soils of ultramafic origin, such as serpentine. California plants, growing in a dense damp woods, are larger than Oregon plants in all respects with a strong tendency to produce colored flowers. In contrast, Oregon plants found in dry open woods are tiny plants with freckled white flowers.

== Ecology ==
Pseudotrillium rivale flowers April to June, with northern California plants flowering somewhat later than those in Oregon. At higher elevations, the onset of flowering may be delayed until early May. After flowering, the entire plant may enlarge and become more robust and turgid with very glossy leaves. Initially the pedicel is of moderate length but it soon begins to lengthen and twist in a most unusual way. If fertilization is successful, the pedicel arches downward so that the fruit comes in contact with the soil. By mid-July, the entire plant withers and goes dormant.

== Uses ==
Under its former name, Trillium rivale, this plant has gained the Royal Horticultural Society's Award of Garden Merit. Hardy down to −10 °C (14 °F), it requires a sheltered position in partial or full shade.

== Bibliography ==
- Case, Frederick W. Jr. [in Spanish]; Case, Roberta B. (1997). Trilliums. Portland, Oregon: Timber Press. ISBN 978-0-88192-374-2.
- Lampley, Jayne A. (2021). A systematic and biogeographic study of Trillium (Melanthiaceae) (PhD). University of Tennessee.
