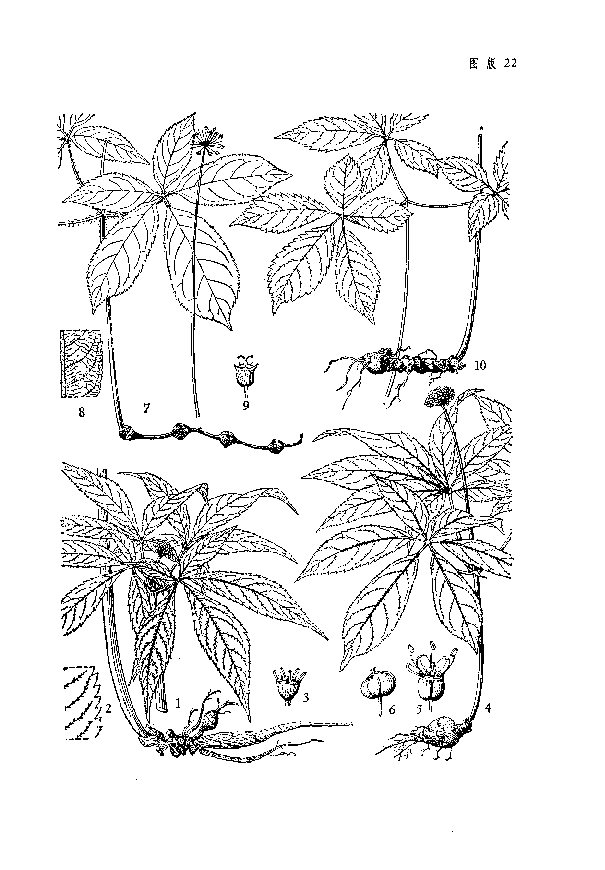
- Botanical illustration

Scientific classification
- Kingdom: Plantae
- Clade: Tracheophytes
- Clade: Angiosperms
- Clade: Eudicots
- Clade: Asterids
- Order: Apiales
- Family: Araliaceae
- Genus: Panax
- Species: P. notoginseng

Binomial name
- Panax notoginseng (Burkill) F.H.Chen

= Panax notoginseng =

Notoginseng

Species of flowering plant

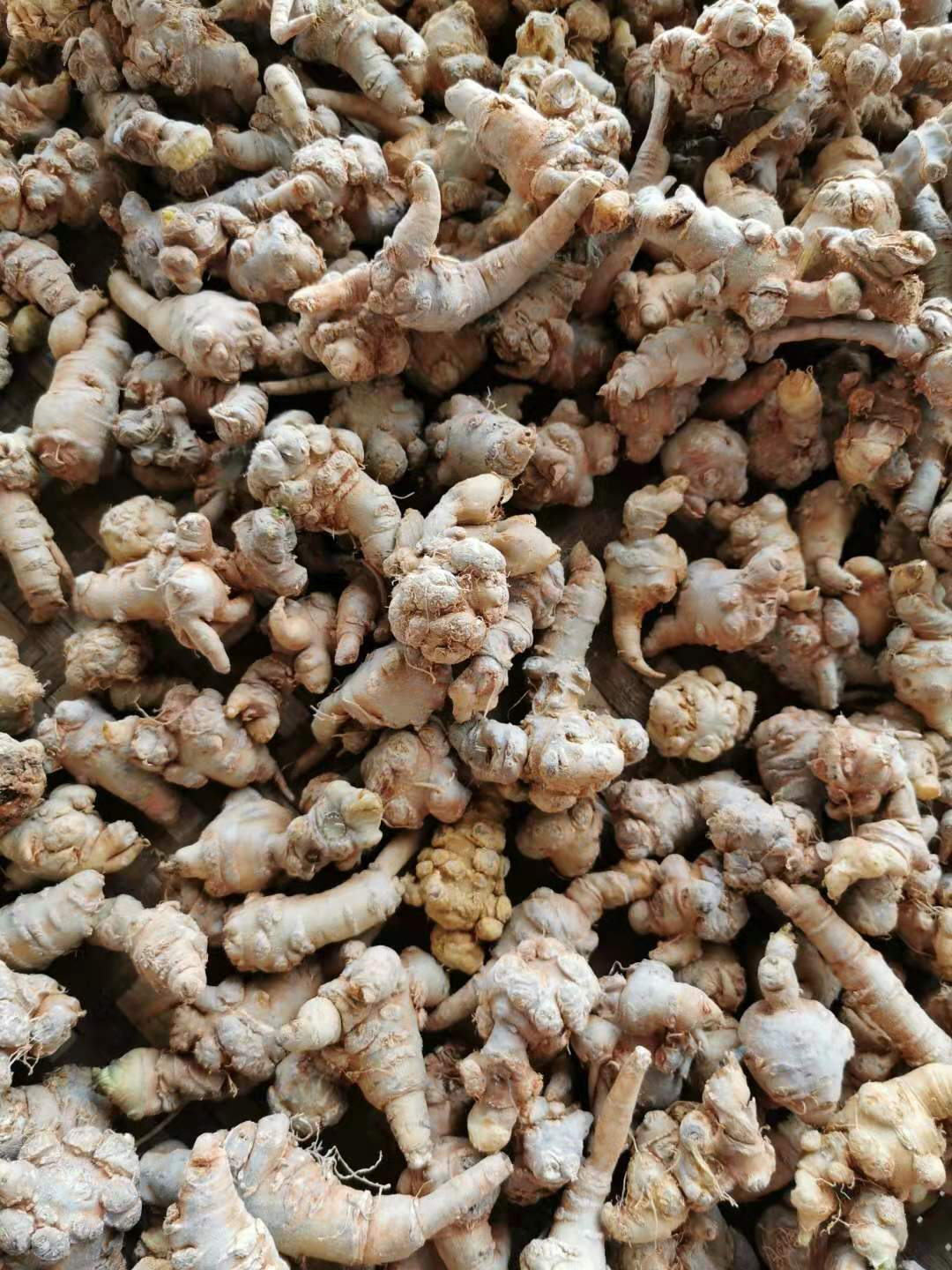
Roots

Panax notoginseng is a species of the genus Panax, and it is commonly referred to in English as Chinese ginseng or notoginseng. In Chinese it is called tiánqī (田七), tienchi ginseng, sānqī (三七) or sanchi, three-seven root, and mountain plant. P. notoginseng belongs to the same scientific genus as Panax ginseng. In Latin, the word panax means "cure-all", and the family of ginseng plants is one of the best-known herbs.

Panax notoginseng grows naturally in China. The herb is a perennial with dark green leaves branching from a stem with a red cluster of berries in the middle. It is both cultivated and gathered from wild forests, with wild plants being the most valuable. The Chinese refer to it as three-seven root because the plant has three petioles with seven leaflets each. It is also said that the root should be harvested between three and seven years after planting it.

== Chinese medicine ==
In traditional Chinese medicine, P. notoginseng is classified as warm in nature. The taste is sweet and slightly bitter. A decoction of 5-10 g is a typical dose. It can also be ground to a powder for swallowing directly or taken mixed with water. The dose in that case is usually 1-3 g.

== Chemical components ==
P. notoginseng contains dammarane-type ginsenosides as major constituents. Dammarane-type ginsenosides includes 2 classifications: the 20(S)-protopanaxadiol (ppd) and 20(S)-protopanaxatriol (ppt) classifications. P. notoginseng contains high levels of Rb1, Rd (ppd classification) and Rg1 (ppt classification) ginsenosides. Rb1, Rd and Rg1 content of P. notoginseng is found to be higher than that of P. ginseng and P. quinquefolius in one study.

== See also ==
- Panax pseudoginseng
