= Horse Wood, Mileham =

UK Site of Special Scientific Interest

Coordinates: 52.731°N 0.844°E

- Site of Special Scientific Interest
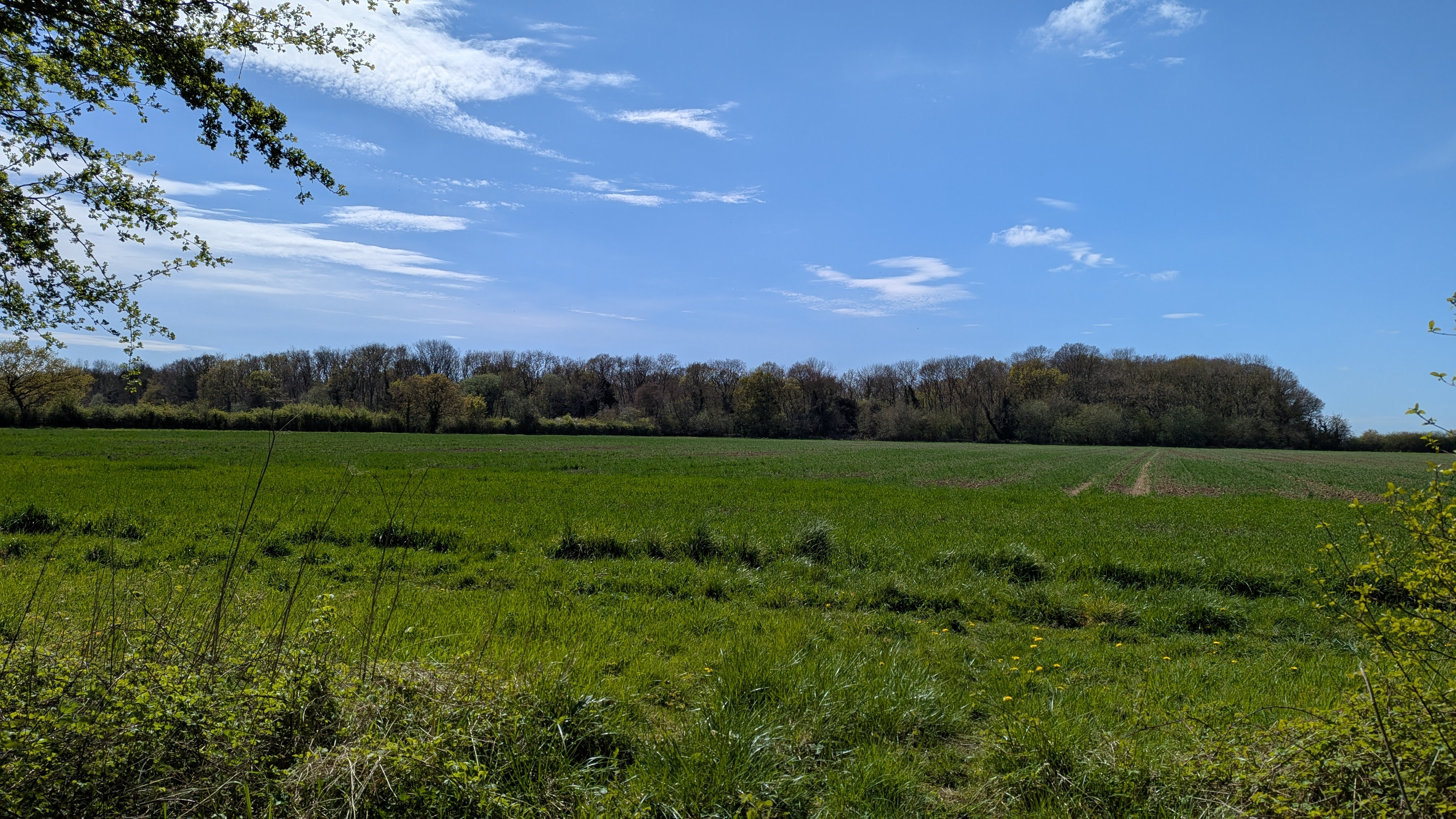
- Horse Wood, Mileham
- Location of Horse Wood, Mileham.
- Area of search: Norfolk
- Grid reference: TF 921 186
- Interest: Biological
- Area: 7.1 hectares (18 acres)
- Notification date: 1985
- Location map: Magic Map

Horse Wood, Mileham is a 7.1-hectare (18-acre) biological Site of Special Scientific Interest north-west of Dereham in Norfolk, England.

It is an ancient coppice with standards wood on boulder clay, and the ground flora is diverse with several rare species. There are wide and wet rides which have plants such as herb paris, valerian and water mint.
