= Ginsenoside Rb1 =

Ginsenoside Rb_{1}
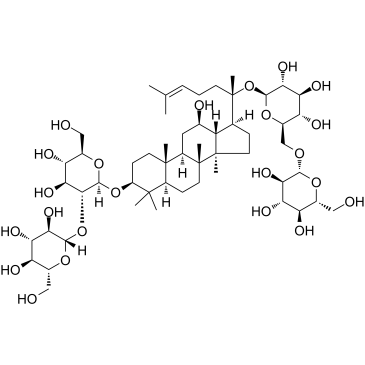

Names
- IUPAC name 20-[β-D-Glucopyranosyl-(1→6)-β-D-glucopyranosyloxy]-12β-hydroxydammar-24-en-3β-yl β-D-glucopyranosyl-(1→2)-β-D-glucopyranoside
- Systematic IUPAC name (1^{2}S,1^{3}R,1^{4}S,1^{5}S,1^{6}R,3^{2}R,3^{3}R,3^{4}S,3^{5}S,3^{6}R,5^{1}S,5^{3a}R,5^{3b}R,5^{5a}R,5^{7}S,5^{9a}R,5^{9b}R,5^{11}R,5^{11a}R,6S,8^{2}S,8^{3}R,8^{4}S,8^{5}S,8^{6}R,11^{2}R,11^{3}R,11^{4}S,11^{5}R,11^{6}R)-1^{6},3^{6},11^{6}-Tris(hydroxymethyl)-5^{3a},5^{3b},5^{6},5^{6},5^{9a},6-hexamethyl-6-(4-methylpent-3-en-1-yl)hexadecahydro-5^{1}H-2,4,7,10-tetraoxa-1,11(2),3(3,2),8(2,6)-tetrakis(oxana)-5(7,1)-cyclopenta[a]phenanthrenaundecaphane-1^{3},1^{4},1^{5},3^{4},3^{5},5^{11},8^{3},8^{4},8^{5},11^{3},11^{4},11^{5}-dodecol
- Other names: Ginsenoside-Rb1; GRb 1; GSRb1; Panax saponin E; Panaxsaponin E; Panaxoside Rb1; Pseudoginsenoside D; Gynosaponin C; Gypenoside III; Sanchinoside E1; Sanchinoside R1; Sanchinoside Rb1; Arasaponin E1; Notoginsenoside Rb1

Identifiers
CAS Number	41753-43-9
3D model (JSmol)	Interactive image
ChEBI	CHEBI:CHEBI:67989
ChemSpider	8073937
DrugBank	DB06749
ECHA InfoCard	100.050.466
EC Number	255-532-8
KEGG	C20713
PubChem CID	9898279
UNII	7413S0WMH6
CompTox Dashboard (EPA)	DTXSID401316929
- InChI: InChI=1S/C54H92O23/c1-23(2)10-9-14-54(8,77-48-44(69)40(65)37(62)29(74-48)22-70-46-42(67)38(63)34(59)26(19-55)71-46)24-11-16-53(7)33(24)25(58)18-31-51(5)15-13-32(50(3,4)30(51)12-17-52(31,53)6)75-49-45(41(66)36(61)28(21-57)73-49)76-47-43(68)39(64)35(60)27(20-56)72-47/h10,24-49,55-69H,9,11-22H2,1-8H3/t24-,25+,26+,27+,28+,29+,30-,31+,32-,33-,34+,35+,36+,37+,38-,39-,40-,41-,42+,43+,44+,45+,46+,47-,48-,49-,51-,52+,53+,54-/m0/s1 Key: GZYPWOGIYAIIPV-JBDTYSNRSA-N
- SMILES: CC(=CCC[C@@](C)([C@H]1CC[C@@]2([C@@H]1[C@@H](C[C@H]3[C@]2(CC[C@@H]4[C@@]3(CC[C@@H](C4(C)C)O[C@H]5[C@@H]([C@H]([C@@H]([C@H](O5)CO)O)O)O[C@H]6[C@@H]([C@H]([C@@H]([C@H](O6)CO)O)O)O)C)C)O)C)O[C@H]7[C@@H]([C@H]([C@@H]([C@H](O7)CO[C@H]8[C@@H]([C@H]([C@@H]([C@H](O8)CO)O)O)O)O)O)O)C

Properties
Chemical formula	C_{54}H_{92}O_{23}
Molar mass	1109.307 g·mol^{−1}

Hazards
- GHS labelling
Pictograms	(GHS07: Exclamation mark)
Signal word	Warning
Hazard statements	H302, H312, H332
Precautionary statements	P261, P264, P270, P271, P280, P301+P312, P302+P352, P304+P312, P304+P340, P312, P322, P330, P363, P501
- Except where otherwise noted, data are given for materials in their standard state (at 25 °C [77 °F], 100 kPa). Infobox references

Ginsenoside Rb_{1} (or Ginsenoside Rb1 or GRb_{1} or GRb1) is a chemical compound belonging to the ginsenoside family.

Like other ginsenosides, it is found in the plant genus Panax (ginseng), and has a variety of potential health effects including anticarcinogenic, immunomodulatory, anti‐inflammatory, antiallergic, antiatherosclerotic, antihypertensive, and antidiabetic effects as well as antistress activity and effects on the central nervous system.

== Pharmacological effects ==
A 1998 study by Seoul National University reported that GRb_{1} and GRg_{3} (ginsenosides Rb_{1} and Rg_{3}) significantly attenuated glutamate-induced neurotoxicity by inhibiting the overproduction of nitric oxide synthase among some other findings regarding their neuroprotective properties.

In 2002, the Laboratory for Cancer Research in Rutgers University showed that GRb_{1} and GRg_{1} have neuroprotective effect for spinal cord neurons, while ginsenoside Re did not exhibit any activity. GRb_{1} and GRg_{1} are proposed to represent potentially effective therapeutic agents for spinal cord injuries.

The protection that GRg_{1} (ginsenoside Rg_{1}) and GRb_{1} offer against Alzheimer’s disease symptoms in mice was first published by researchers in 2015. The GRg_{1} affected three metabolic pathways: the metabolism of lecithin, amino acids and sphingolipids, while GRb_{1} treatment affected lecithin and amino acid metabolism.

It was reported in 2017 that GRb_{1} improved cardiac function and remodelling in heart failure in mice. The treatment of H-ginsenoside Rb_{1} potentially attenuated cardiac hypertrophy and myocardial fibrosis.

== Proposed biosynthesis ==
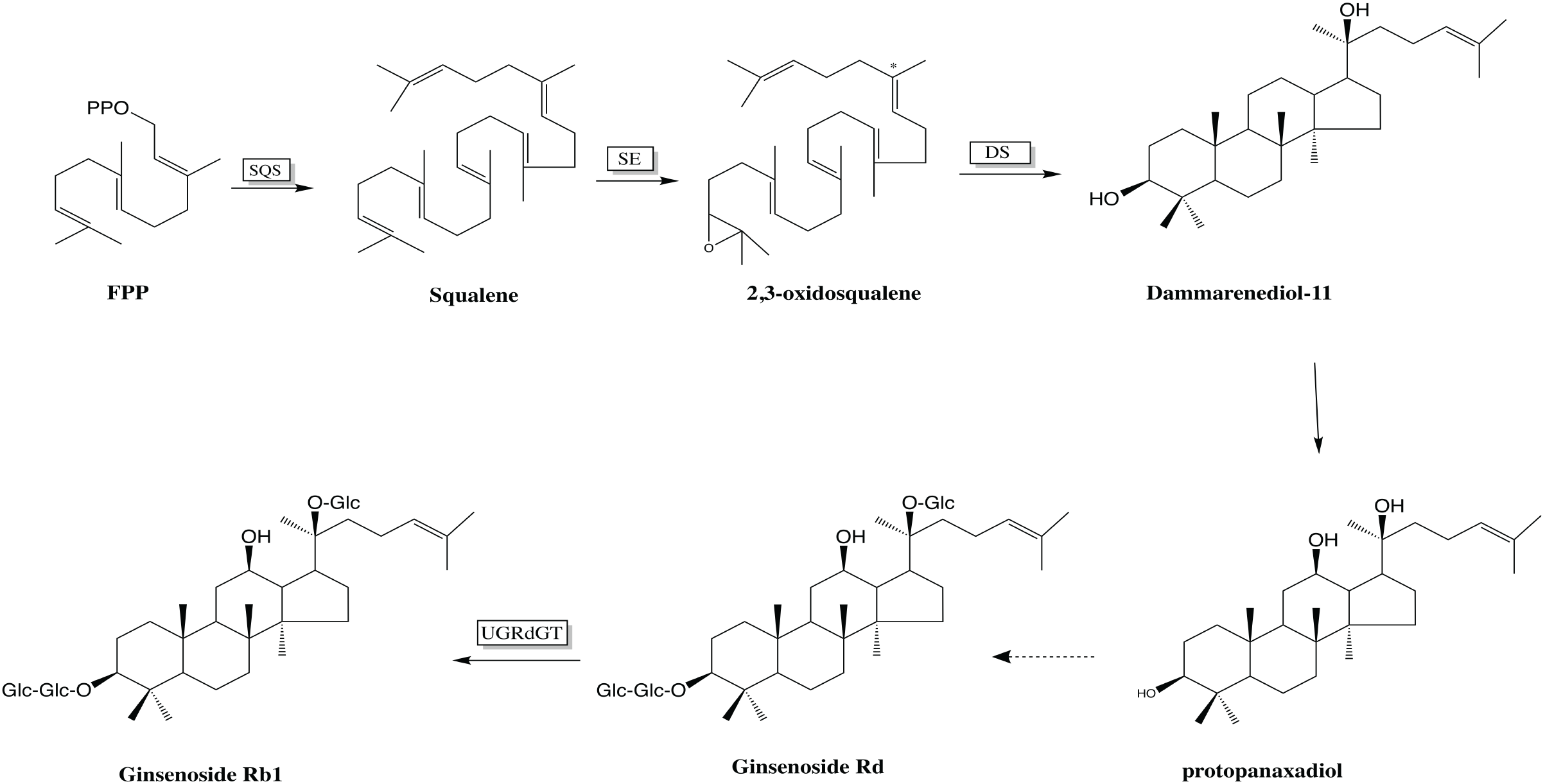
The proposed biosynthesis of ginsenoside Rb_{1} in Panax ginseng.

The biosynthesis of GRb_{1} in Panax ginseng starts from farnesyl diphosphate (FPP), which is converted to squalene with squalene synthase (SQS), then to 2,3-oxidosqualene with squalene epoxidase (SE).

The 2,3-oxidasqualene is then converted to dammarenediol-II by cyclization, with dammarenediol-II synthase (DS) as the catalyst. The dammarenediol-II is converted to protopanaxadiol and then to ginsenoside Rd.

Finally, GRb_{1} is synthesized from ginsenoside Rd, catalysed by UDPG:ginsenoside Rd glucosyltransferase (UGRdGT), a biosynthetic enzyme of GRb_{1} first discovered in 2005.
