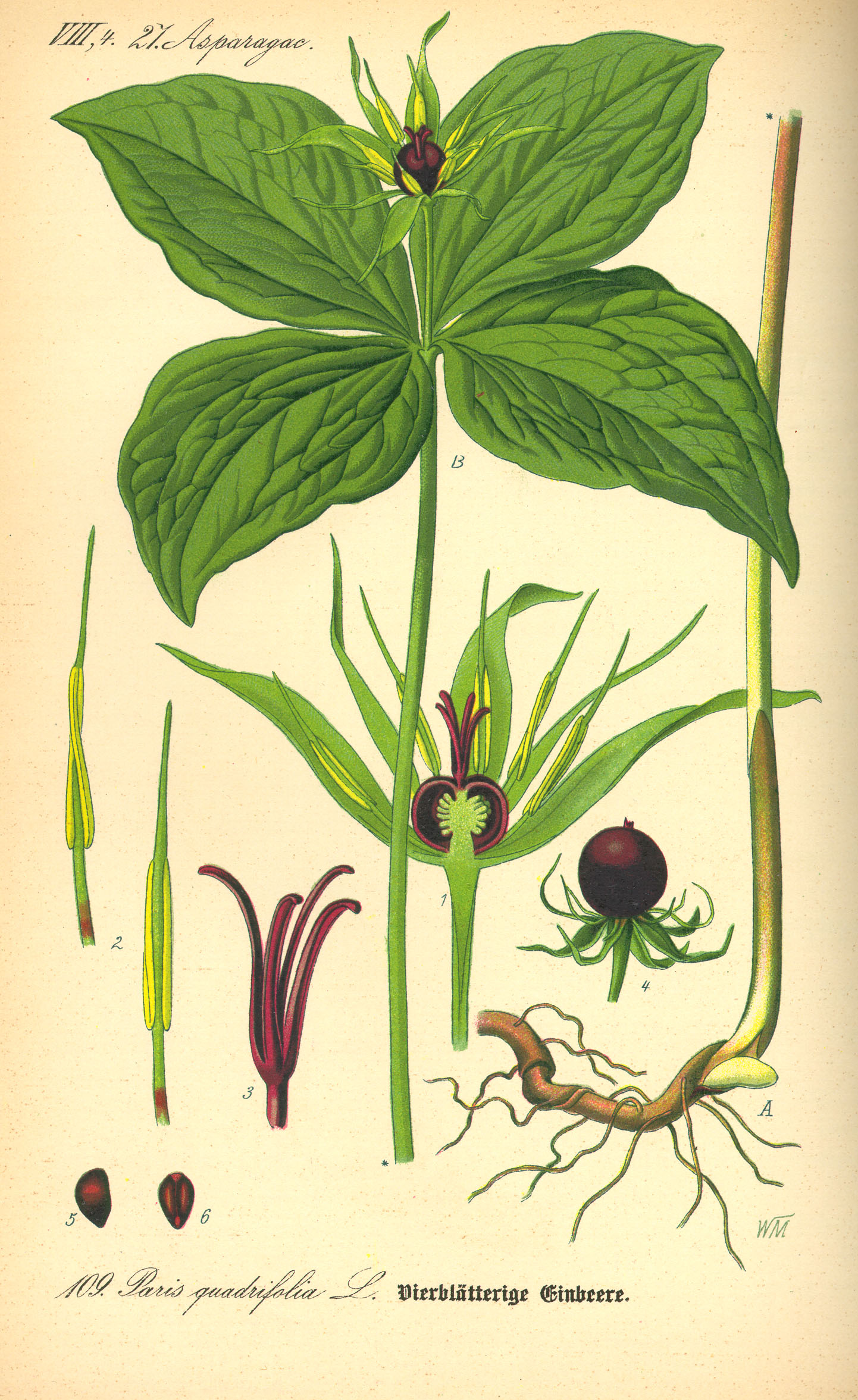
- Paris quadrifolia

Scientific classification
- Kingdom: Plantae
- Clade: Embryophytes
- Clade: Tracheophytes
- Clade: Spermatophytes
- Clade: Angiosperms
- Clade: Monocots
- Order: Liliales
- Family: Melanthiaceae
- Tribe: Parideae; Bartl.

= Parideae =

Tribe of flowering plants

Parideae is a tribe of flowering plants in the family Melanthiaceae. This group was previously treated as a separate family, Trilliceae.

== Taxonomy ==
Parideae was named by Friedrich Gottlieb Bartling in 1830. At the time, Bartling placed four genera in tribe Parideae: Myrsiphyllum Willd., Medeola L., Trillium L., and Paris L. As of March 2023, Myrsiphyllum is a synonym for Asparagus L. and Medeola is a member of tribe Medeoleae in the family Liliaceae. The type genus for tribe Parideae is Paris.

== Subdivisions ==
Some authorities recognize six genera within tribe Parideae:

- Daiswa Raf.
- Kinugasa Tatew. & Sutô
- Paris L. sensu stricto
- Pseudotrillium S.B.Farmer
- Trillidium Kunth
- Trillium L. sensu stricto

As of March 2025, Plants of the World Online considers Daiswa and Kinugasa to be synonyms of Paris, and Trillidium to be a synonym of Trillium.

== Bibliography ==
- Farmer, Susan B.; Schilling, Edward E. (October 2002). "Phylogenetic Analyses of Trilliaceae based on Morphological and Molecular Data" (PDF). Systematic Botany. 27 (4): 674–692. JSTOR 3093915.
