= Panaxatriol =

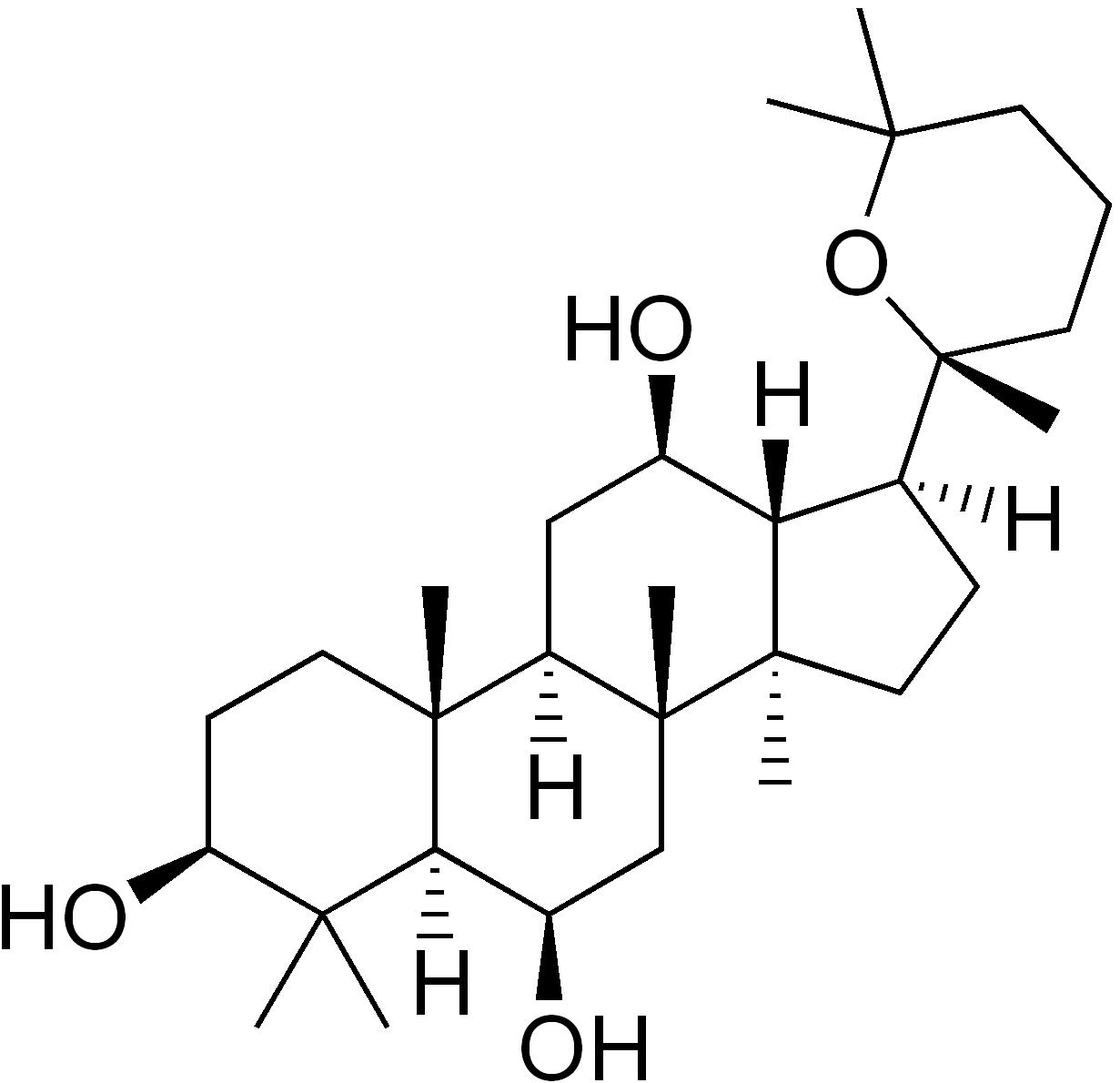

Names
- IUPAC name (20R)-20,25-Epoxydammarane-3β,6β,12β-triol
- Systematic IUPAC name (1S,3aR,3bR,5R,5aR,7S,9aR,9bR,11R,11aR)-3a,3b,6,6,9a-Pentamethyl-1-[(2R)-2,6,6-trimethyloxan-2-yl]hexadecahydro-1H-cyclopenta[a]phenanthrene-5,7,11-triol

Identifiers
CAS Number	32791-84-7
3D model (JSmol)	Interactive image
ChemSpider	66270
ECHA InfoCard	100.208.677
PubChem CID	73599
UNII	9F5B25FDDG
CompTox Dashboard (EPA)	DTXSID60954454
- InChI: InChI=1S/C30H52O4/c1-25(2)12-9-13-30(8,34-25)18-10-15-28(6)23(18)19(31)16-21-27(5)14-11-22(33)26(3,4)24(27)20(32)17-29(21,28)7/h18-24,31-33H,9-17H2,1-8H3/t18-,19+,20+,21+,22-,23-,24-,27+,28+,29+,30+/m0/s1 Key: QFJUYMMIBFBOJY-UXZRXANASA-N; InChI=1/C30H52O4/c1-25(2)12-9-13-30(8,34-25)18-10-15-28(6)23(18)19(31)16-21-27(5)14-11-22(33)26(3,4)24(27)20(32)17-29(21,28)7/h18-24,31-33H,9-17H2,1-8H3/t18-,19+,20+,21+,22-,23-,24-,27+,28+,29+,30+/m0/s1 Key: QFJUYMMIBFBOJY-UXZRXANABD
- SMILES: C[C@@]1(CCCC(O1)(C)C)[C@H]2CC[C@@]3([C@@H]2[C@@H](C[C@H]4[C@]3(C[C@H]([C@@H]5[C@@]4(CC[C@@H](C5(C)C)O)C)O)C)O)C

Properties
Chemical formula	C_{30}H_{52}O_{4}
Molar mass	476.742 g·mol^{−1}
- Except where otherwise noted, data are given for materials in their standard state (at 25 °C [77 °F], 100 kPa). verify (what is ?) Infobox references

Panaxatriol is an organic compound that is an aglycone of ginsenosides, a group of steroid glycosides. It is a dammarane-type tetracyclic triterpene sapogenin found in ginseng (Panax ginseng) and in notoginseng (Panax pseudoginseng). It is formed by the dehydration of protopanaxatriol.

== See also ==
- Protopanaxadiol
