= PEN1 =

PEN1 may refer to:

- Public Enemy No. 1 (street gang)
- Arabidiol synthase, an enzyme
