= Yunnan Baiyao Group =

Chinese pharmaceutical company

Yunnan Baiyao Group Co., Ltd
- Traded as: SZSE: 000538; CSI A100
- Industry: Pharmaceutical
- Headquarters: Kunming, China
- Revenue: RMB 22.6 billion (2016)
- Website: Website

Yunnan Baiyao Group Co., Ltd is a Chinese pharmaceutical company that develops and manufactures pharmaceutical products (mainly traditional Chinese medicine) and the wholesale and retail of pharmaceutical products.

The Government Pension Fund of Norway has excluded the company from investments since 21 December 2021, since the company "uses and sells body parts from pangolins which is a globally endangered species".

As of 2024, state and individual investors hold 29% of the shares and private companies hold 35%. The three largest shareholders hold 58 per cent of the company's shares.

== Corporate affairs ==
As of December 31, 2007, the company had 12 subsidiaries, engaged in the pharmaceutical industry, and four major associates, involved in securities, investment and biotechnological research.

== Products ==
Its core product range includes the Yunnan Bai Yao series and the Natural Vegetable series. The company is also involved in the operation of hotels and department stores. For the fiscal year of 2007, YBG obtained approximately 99% of its total revenue from the sale of pharmaceutical products.

== Collaboration with Huawei ==
On 25 July 2022, Yunnan Baiyao Group signed a cooperation agreement with Huawei for research and development of artificial intelligence drugs.

== Violations of fundamental norms ==
On 21 December 2021, the Government Pension Fund of Norway, the world's largest sovereign wealth fund, divested from the company. The reason for the divestment and exclusion of the company is "due to unacceptable risk that the company contributes to serious environmental damage". More specifically, the company "uses and sells body parts from pangolins which is a globally endangered species".

== See also ==
- Pharmaceutical industry in China
- Biotechnology industry in China
