= Shanghai Innovative Research Center of Traditional Chinese Medicine =

Chinese research institute

- Industry: Healthcare, Pharmaceutical, Information Services
- Founded: 2000
- Headquarters: Shanghai, China
- Products: SAPHRON TCM Database, Yuxintine
- Number of employees: 60
- Website: www.sirc-tcm.sh.cn (English version unmaintained)

Shanghai Innovative Research Center of Traditional Chinese Medicine (SIRC-TCM; Chinese: 上海中药创新研究中心), also known as National Innovation Center of TCM Modernization in Shanghai (国家中药现代化(上海)创新中心), is a Chinese research institute focusing on herbal medicine discovery and natural product development. SIRC-TCM was founded in 2000 and is headquartered in Shanghai, China.

== Products ==
- SAPHRON TCM Database (赛方中医药数据库)
- Youxinding (Yoxintine, S111), a formulation of 20(S)-protopanaxadiol (Note: The abstract of the phase II study made a typographical error in naming the substance. The correct name is given by the related studies found by the Synapse new drug database.) in trial (phase II complete) for depression. As of May 2024, phase III trials are reported to be in progress.
- Gengshu'an Granules (更舒安颗粒), TCM formulation. Clinical trial for menopause symptoms approved by Chinese authorities, status otherwise unknown.
- Herbal dietary supplements LP01, DP04, CS05, CM12, QT01, AP01, Feng Yuan Capsule (丰源胶囊)
- TCM-derived pure compounds
