= Ginsenoside =

Class of steroids

The chemical structure of the ginsenoside Rg1, a member of the dammarane family of molecules.

Ginsenosides or panaxosides are a class of natural product steroid glycosides and triterpene saponins. Compounds in this family are found almost exclusively in the plant genus Panax (ginseng), which has a long history of use in traditional medicine that has led to the study of pharmacological effects of ginseng compounds. As a class, ginsenosides exhibit a large variety of subtle and difficult-to-characterize biological effects when studied in isolation.

Ginsenosides can be isolated from various parts of the plant, though typically from the roots, and can be purified by column chromatography. The chemical profiles of Panax species are distinct; although Asian ginseng, Panax ginseng, has been most widely studied due to its use in traditional Chinese medicine, there are ginsenosides unique to American ginseng (Panax quinquefolius) and Japanese ginseng (Panax japonicus). Ginsenoside content also varies significantly due to environmental effects. The leaves and stems have emerged as a more abundant and easier-to-extract source of ginsenosides. Ginsenosides have also been found in jiaogulan, making jiaogulan the first plant outside of Araliaceae to contain ginsenosides.

== Nomenclature ==
Ginsenosides are named according to their retention factor in thin layer chromatography (TLC). The letter or number after R is a serial indication of the retention factor, with '0' being most polar, followed by 'a' for the second-most polar, to 'h' being a fairly non-polar ginsenoside. Some of these groups turn out to consist of several molecules are further broken down with numbers: for example, Ra1 is more polar than Ra2. Terms such as "20-gluco-f" may be used to indicate further modification.

A different nomenclature is applied to so-called pseudoginsenosides and notoginsenosides. The difference in name reflects more about the circumstances of their discovery than about their chemical nature.

== Classification and structure ==
They can be broadly divided into two groups based on the carbon skeletons of their aglycones: the four-ring dammarane family, which contains the majority of known ginsenosides, and the oleanane family. The dammaranes further subdivided into 2 main groups, the protopanaxadiols (PPDs) and protopanaxatriols (PPTs), with other smaller groups such as the ocotillol-type pseudoginsenoside F11 and its derivatives.

To each ginsenoside is bound at least 2 or 3 hydroxyl groups at the carbon-3 and -20 positions or the carbon-3, -6, and -20 positions respectively. In protopanaxadiols, sugar groups attach to the 3-position of the carbon skeleton, while in comparison sugar groups attach to the carbon-6 position in protopanaxatriols. Well known protopanaxadiols include Rb1, Rb2, Rc, Rd, Rg3, Rh2, and Rh3. Well known protopanaxatriols include Re, Rg1, Rg2, and Rh1.

Ginsenosides that are a member of the oleanane family are pentacyclic, composed of a five ring carbon skeleton. R0 (also written Ro) is an example.

== Biosynthesis ==
The biosynthetic pathway of ginsenosides start in a way common to most steroids, from squalene to 2,3-oxidosqualene via the action of squalene epoxidase, at which point dammaranes can be synthesized through dammarenediol synthase and oleananes through beta-amyrin synthase. As of 2021, the full conversion pathway to protopanaxadiol, protopanaxatriol, and oleanolic acid are known with each step having been assigned at least one gene. Ootillol synthesis remains unclear: 2,3-oxidosqualene is believed to first be converted into 2,3,22,23-dioxidosqualene. An unknown oxidosqualene cyclase produces 3-epicabraleadiol, which is the immediate precursor to ootillol.

In the proposed pathway, squalene is synthesized from the assembly of two farnesyl diphosphate (FPP) molecules. Each molecule of FPP is in turn the product of two molecules of dimethylallyl diphosphate and two molecules of isopentenyl diphosphate (IPP). IPP is produced by the mevalonic pathway in the cytosol of a ginseng plant cell and by the methylerythritol phosphate pathway in the plant's plastid.

Many UGT enzymes found in the genome of various Panax species are known to be responsible for attaching sugars onto the sterol skeleton, producing ginsenosides. A handful of reactions still don't have an identified UGT. Enzymes responsible for attaching other side chains such as acidic groups and acyls are not yet identified.

=== Function for the plant ===
Ginsenosides likely serve as mechanisms for plant defense. Exposing in vitro cultures of ginseng cells to the plant defense signal methyl jasmonate causes increased production of ginsenosides. Exposing adventitious roots to fungal suspension homogenate of the ginseng blight Alternaria panax increases ginsenoside production.

Ginsenosides have been found to have both antimicrobial and antifungal properties. Ginsenoside molecules are naturally bitter-tasting and discourage insects and other animals from consuming the plant. It's also been proposed that ginsenosides may interfere with insect growth by mimicking ecdysteroids, though in Drosophilia fruit flies this mimicking activity actually increases fertility.

== Chemical reactions ==
Steaming ginseng causes ginsenosides to lose their sugar and malonyl side chains, converting more polar molecules into the rarer (in nature), less-polar ones. This change may be responsible for the different effects attributed to red ginseng vs. white ginseng. The same is true of the pulp of the ginseng fruit. Similarly, heat and acid treatment of the stem and leaves can produce less-polar ginsenosides. In general, the less-polar molecules are believed to be easier to be absorbed and to bind onto cell membranes. Some reports claim a stronger biological activity in vitro.

=== Metabolism ===
Ginseng is generally consumed orally as a dietary supplement, and thus its component ginsenosides may be metabolized by gut flora to less-polar molecules. For example, ginsenosides Rb1 and Rb2 are converted to 20-b-O-glucopyranosyl-20(S)-protopanaxadiol or 20(S)-protopanaxadiol by human gut bacteria. This process is known to vary significantly between individuals. In some cases the metabolites of ginsenosides may be the biologically active compounds.

== Biological effects ==
Most studies of the biological effects of ginsenosides have been in cell culture or animal models and thus their relevance to human biology is unknown. Effects on the cardiovascular system, central nervous system and immune system have been reported, primarily in rodents. Antiproliferative effects have also been described.

Many studies suggest that ginsenosides have antioxidant properties. Ginsenosides have been observed to increase internal antioxidant enzymes and act as a free-radical scavenger. Ginsenosides Rg3 and Rh2 have been observed in cell models as having an inhibitory effect on the cell growth of various cancer cells while studies in animal models have suggested that ginsenosides have neuroprotective properties and could be useful in treating neurodegenerative disease such as Alzheimer's and Parkinson's diseases.

Two broad mechanisms of action have been suggested for ginsenoside activity, based on their similarity to steroid hormones. They are amphiphilic and may interact with and change the properties of cell membranes. Some ginsenosides have also been shown to be partial agonists of steroid hormone receptors. It is not known how these mechanisms yield the reported biological effects of ginsenosides. The molecules as a class have low bioavailability due to both metabolism and poor intestinal absorption.

== Sources ==
Although traditionally sourced from the root following folk medicine use, ginsenosides have been isolated from other parts of the plant. The concentration in the stems and leaves of Asian ginseng is 3-6%, compared to just 1-3% in the root. Compared to the root, ginseng fruit pulp contains 7 times the amount of ginsenoside Re and 4 times the amount of total ginsenosides.

Cell and tissue culture has also produced significant amounts of ginsenoside, especially when key biosynthetic genes are overexpressed.

== See also ==
- Gintonin
- Pseudoginsenoside F11
