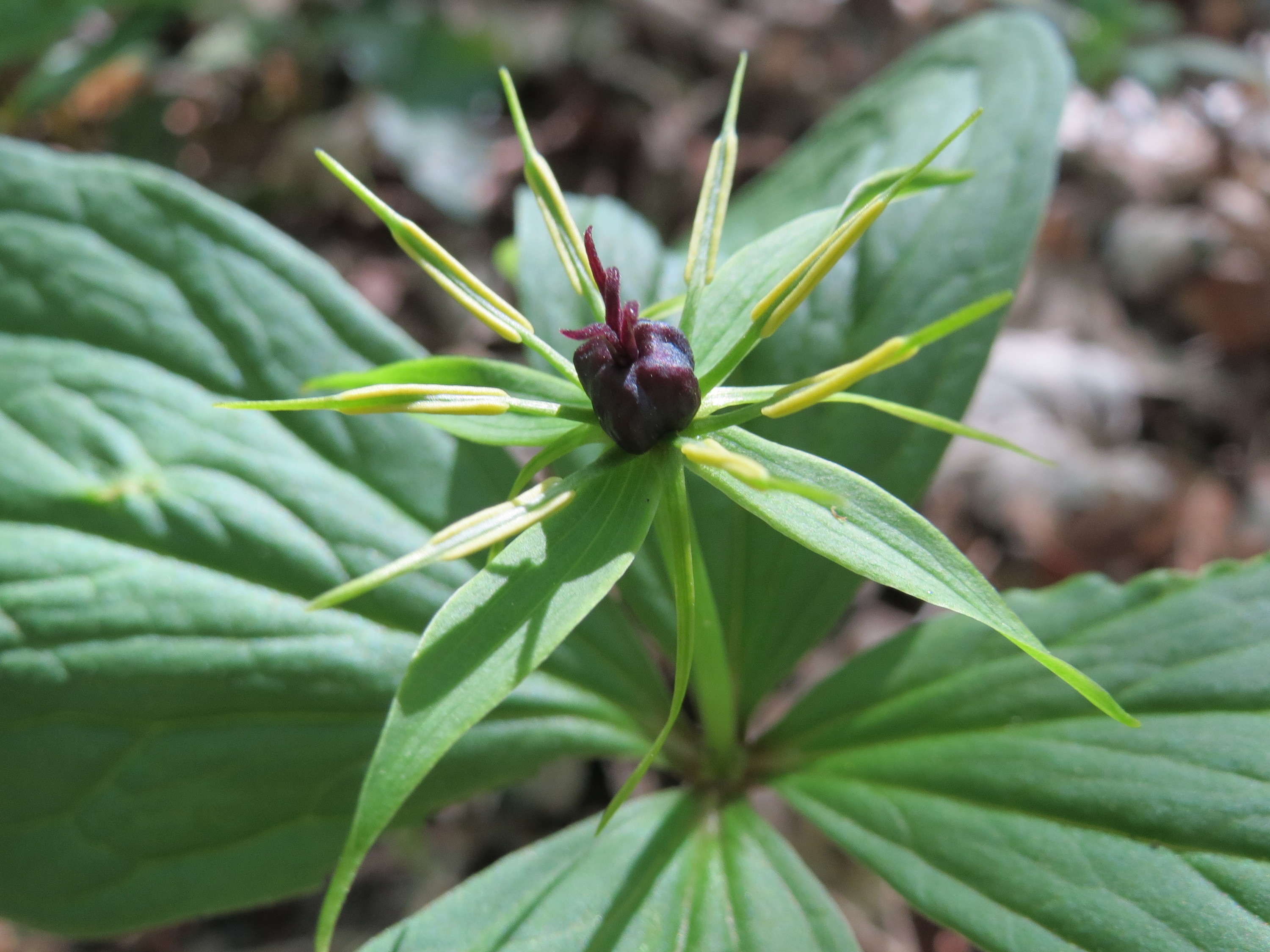
- Paris quadrifolia

Scientific classification
- Kingdom: Plantae
- Clade: Tracheophytes
- Clade: Angiosperms
- Clade: Monocots
- Order: Liliales
- Family: Melanthiaceae
- Tribe: Parideae
- Genus: Paris; L.

Species
- See text

Synonyms
- Alopicarpus Neck.; Demidovia Hoffm.; Daiswa Raf.; Cartalinia Szov. ex Kunth; Euthyra Salisb.; Kinugasa Tatew. & Sutô

= Paris (plant) =

Genus of flowering plants

Paris is a genus of flowering plants described by Linnaeus in 1753. It is widespread across Europe and Asia, with a center of diversity in China.

It consists of less than two dozen herbaceous plants: the best known species is Paris quadrifolia. Some Paris species are used in traditional Chinese medicine for their analgesic and anticoagulant properties, most notably as an ingredient of Yunnan Baiyao. Intense ethnopharmaceutical interest has significantly reduced their numbers.

These plants are closely related to Trillium, with the distinction traditionally being that Trillium contains species which have trimerous (three-petaled) flowers, and Paris contains species which have 4- to 11-merous flowers. A recent analysis places the genera Daiswa and Kinugasa in Paris, though the actual circumscription of the genus is debated.

== Etymology ==
From Latin herba Paris (Herba Paris), Paris herba, from Latin herba and Latin par (“equal”), in reference to the regularity of its leaves, petals, etc. It is neither related to the city Paris nor the Paris of Greek mythology.

== Species ==
The genus consists of the following species:

- Paris axialis – Sichuan, Yunnan
- Paris bashanensis – Sichuan, Hubei
- Paris caobangensis – Vietnam
- Paris cronquistii – Guangxi, Guizhou, Sichuan, Yunnan
- Paris daliensis – Yunnan, Guizhou
- Paris delavayi – Vietnam, Guizhou, Hubei, Hunan, Jiangxi, Sichuan, Yunnan
- Paris dulongensis – Yunnan
- Paris dunniana – Yunnan, Guizhou, Hainan
- Paris fargesii – Arunachal Pradesh, Assam, Bhutan, E Himalayas, N Myanmar, N Vietnam, Guangdong, Guangxi, Guizhou, Hubei, Hunan, Jiangxi, Sichuan, Yunnan
- Paris forrestii – Tibet, Myanmar, Yunnan
- Paris guizhouensis – Guizhou
- Paris incompleta – Turkey, N + S Caucasus
- Paris japonica – Honshu
- Paris luquanensis – Yunnan
- Paris mairei – Guizhou, W Sichuan, N Yunnan
- Paris marmorata – Nepal, Sikkim, Bhutan, Sichuan, Tibet, Yunnan, Assam
- Paris polyandra – Sichuan
- Paris polyphylla – S China, E Himalayas, N Indochina
- Paris quadrifolia – Europe + Asia from Spain + Iceland to Heilongjiang
- Paris rugosa – Yunnan
- Paris stigmatosa – Yunnan
- Paris tetraphylla – Japan
- Paris thibetica – N Myanmar, Assam, Bhutan, Gansu, Guizhou, Sichuan, Tibet, Yunnan
- Paris undulata – Sichuan
- Paris vaniotii – Guizhou, Hunan, Yunnan, N Myanmar
- Paris verticillata – Siberia, Russian Far East, China, Mongolia, Korea, Japan
- Paris vietnamensis – Yunnan, Guangxi, Vietnam

== Bibliography ==
- Yeşil, Yeter; Özhatay, Fatma Neriman (2014-08-15). "Morphological, anatomical and karyological investigations on the genus Paris in Turkey". Biological Diversity and Conservation. 7 (2): 57–69. eISSN 1308-8084.
  - P. quadrifolia and P. incomplete.
- Media related to Paris at Wikimedia Commons
- Data related to Paris at Wikispecies
