= Protopanaxatriol =

Ginseng plant extract

Names
- IUPAC name (20R)-Dammar-24-ene-3β,6α,12β,20-tetrol
- Systematic IUPAC name (1S,3aR,3bR,5S,5aR,7S,9aR,9bR,11R,11aR)-1-[(2R)-2-Hydroxy-6-methylhept-5-en-2-yl]-3a,3b,6,6,9a-pentamethylhexadecahydro-1H-cyclopenta[a]phenanthrene-5,7,11-triol

Identifiers
CAS Number	34080-08-5
3D model (JSmol)	Interactive image
ChemSpider	8023566
KEGG	C20716
PubChem CID	9847853
UNII	ZMK19P3WMP
- InChI: InChI=1S/C30H52O4/c1-18(2)10-9-13-30(8,34)19-11-15-28(6)24(19)20(31)16-22-27(5)14-12-23(33)26(3,4)25(27)21(32)17-29(22,28)7/h10,19-25,31-34H,9,11-17H2,1-8H3/t19-,20+,21-,22+,23-,24-,25-,27+,28+,29+,30+/m0/s1 Key: SHCBCKBYTHZQGZ-DLHMIPLTSA-N; InChI=1/C30H52O4/c1-18(2)10-9-13-30(8,34)19-11-15-28(6)24(19)20(31)16-22-27(5)14-12-23(33)26(3,4)25(27)21(32)17-29(22,28)7/h10,19-25,31-34H,9,11-17H2,1-8H3/t19-,20+,21-,22+,23-,24-,25-,27+,28+,29+,30+/m0/s1 Key: SHCBCKBYTHZQGZ-DLHMIPLTBT
- SMILES: O[C@H]4[C@@H]1[C@H](CC[C@]1([C@]2([C@@H]([C@]3(C)[C@@H]([C@@H](O)C2)C(C)(C)[C@@H](O)CC3)C4)C)C)[C@@](O)(C)CC\C=C(/C)C

Properties
Chemical formula	C_{30}H_{52}O_{4}
Molar mass	476.742 g·mol^{−1}
- Except where otherwise noted, data are given for materials in their standard state (at 25 °C [77 °F], 100 kPa). verify (what is ?) Infobox references

Protopanaxatriol (PPT) is an organic compound that is an aglycone of ginsenosides, a group of steroid glycosides. It is a dammarane-type tetracyclic triterpene sapogenins found in ginseng (Panax ginseng) and in notoginseng (Panax pseudoginseng).

In rats, the oral bioavailability is about 3.7% and the half-life is 0.80 hours (when given as a PPD-PPT mixture). PPT is unstable in acid, showing 40% degradation after 4 hours at 37°C both in pH 1.2 buffer solution and rat stomach contents. It is extensively metabolized in mice.

== See also ==
- Panaxatriol
- Protopanaxadiol
