= Lupan-3beta,20-diol synthase =

Lupan-3β,20-diol synthase

Identifiers
- EC no.: 4.2.1.128

Databases
- IntEnz: IntEnz view
- BRENDA: BRENDA entry
- ExPASy: NiceZyme view
- KEGG: KEGG entry
- MetaCyc: metabolic pathway
- PRIAM: profile
- PDB structures: RCSB PDB PDBe PDBsum
Search
- PMC: articles
- PubMed: articles
- NCBI: proteins

Lupan-3β,20-diol synthase (EC 4.2.1.128, LUP1 (gene)) is an enzyme with systematic name (3S)-2,3-epoxy-2,3-dihydrosqualene hydro-lyase (lupan-3beta,20-diol forming). This enzyme catalyses the following chemical reaction

lupan-3β,20-diol $\rightleftharpoons$ (3S)-2,3-epoxy-2,3-dihydrosqualene + H_{2}O

The reaction occurs in the reverse direction.
