= Arabidiol synthase =

Identifiers
- EC no.: 4.2.1.124

Databases
- IntEnz: IntEnz view
- BRENDA: BRENDA entry
- ExPASy: NiceZyme view
- KEGG: KEGG entry
- MetaCyc: metabolic pathway
- PRIAM: profile
- PDB structures: RCSB PDB PDBe PDBsum
Search
- PMC: articles
- PubMed: articles
- NCBI: proteins

Arabidiol synthase (EC 4.2.1.124, PEN1 (gene), (S)-squalene-2,3-epoxide hydro-lyase (arabidiol forming)) is an enzyme with systematic name (3S)-2,3-epoxy-2,3-dihydrosqualene hydro-lyase (arabidiol forming). This enzyme catalyses the following chemical reaction

arabidiol $\rightleftharpoons$ (3S)-2,3-epoxy-2,3-dihydrosqualene + H_{2}O

The reaction occurs in the reverse direction.
