= Beta-amyrin synthase =

Enzyme

β-Amyrin synthase

Identifiers
- EC no.: 5.4.99.39

Databases
- IntEnz: IntEnz view
- BRENDA: BRENDA entry
- ExPASy: NiceZyme view
- KEGG: KEGG entry
- MetaCyc: metabolic pathway
- PRIAM: profile
- PDB structures: RCSB PDB PDBe PDBsum
Search
- PMC: articles
- PubMed: articles
- NCBI: proteins

β-amyrin synthase (EC 5.4.99.39, 2,3-oxidosqualene beta-amyrin cyclase, AsbAS1, BPY, EtAS, GgbAS1, LjAMY1, MtAMY1, PNY, BgbAS) is an enzyme with systematic name (3S)-2,3-epoxy-2,3-dihydrosqualene mutase (cyclizing, beta-amyrin-forming). This enzyme catalyses the following chemical reaction

(3S)-2,3-epoxy-2,3-dihydrosqualene $\rightleftharpoons$ beta-amyrin

Some organism possess a monofunctional beta-amyrin synthase.
