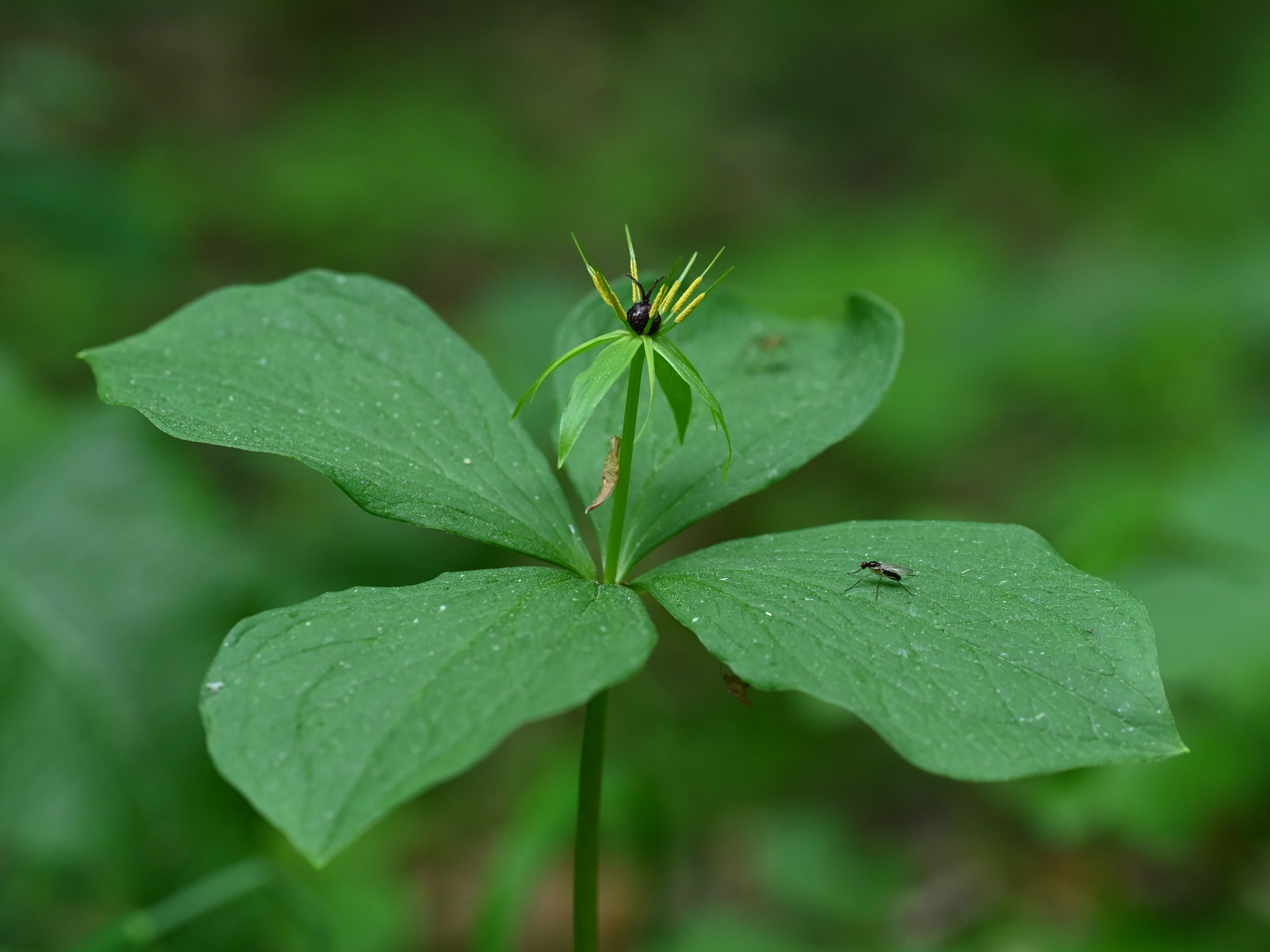
- Paris quadrifolia in Ciemnik, Poland

Conservation status
- Least Concern (IUCN 3.1)

Scientific classification
- Kingdom: Plantae
- Clade: Tracheophytes
- Clade: Angiosperms
- Clade: Monocots
- Order: Liliales
- Family: Melanthiaceae
- Genus: Paris
- Species: P. quadrifolia

Binomial name
- Paris quadrifolia L.

Synonyms
- Paris pentafolia P.Renault; Paris trifolia P.Renault; Paris quadrifolia var. angustiovata D.Z.Ma & H.L.Liu

= Paris quadrifolia =

Flowering plant, family Melanthiaceae

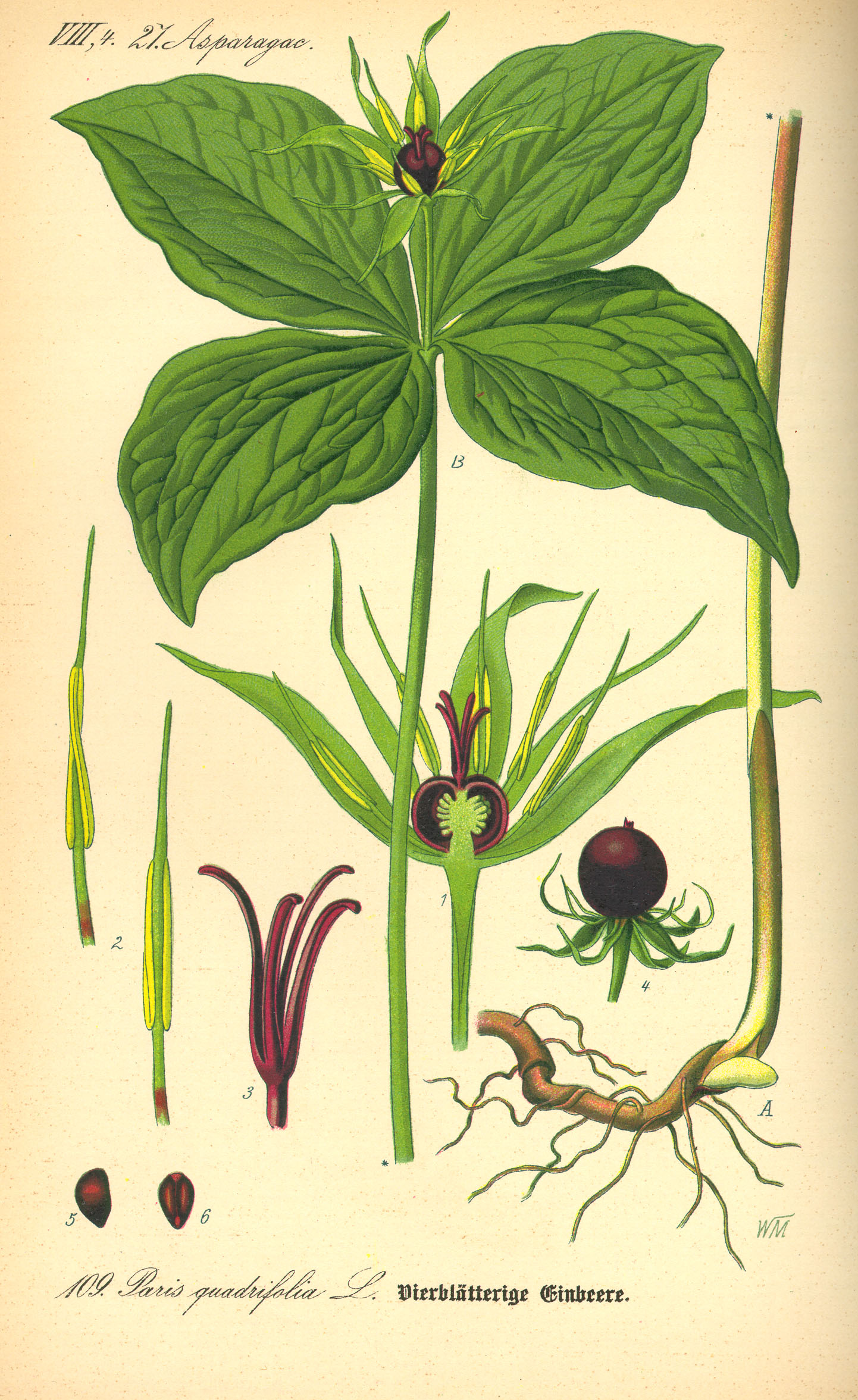
1885 illustration

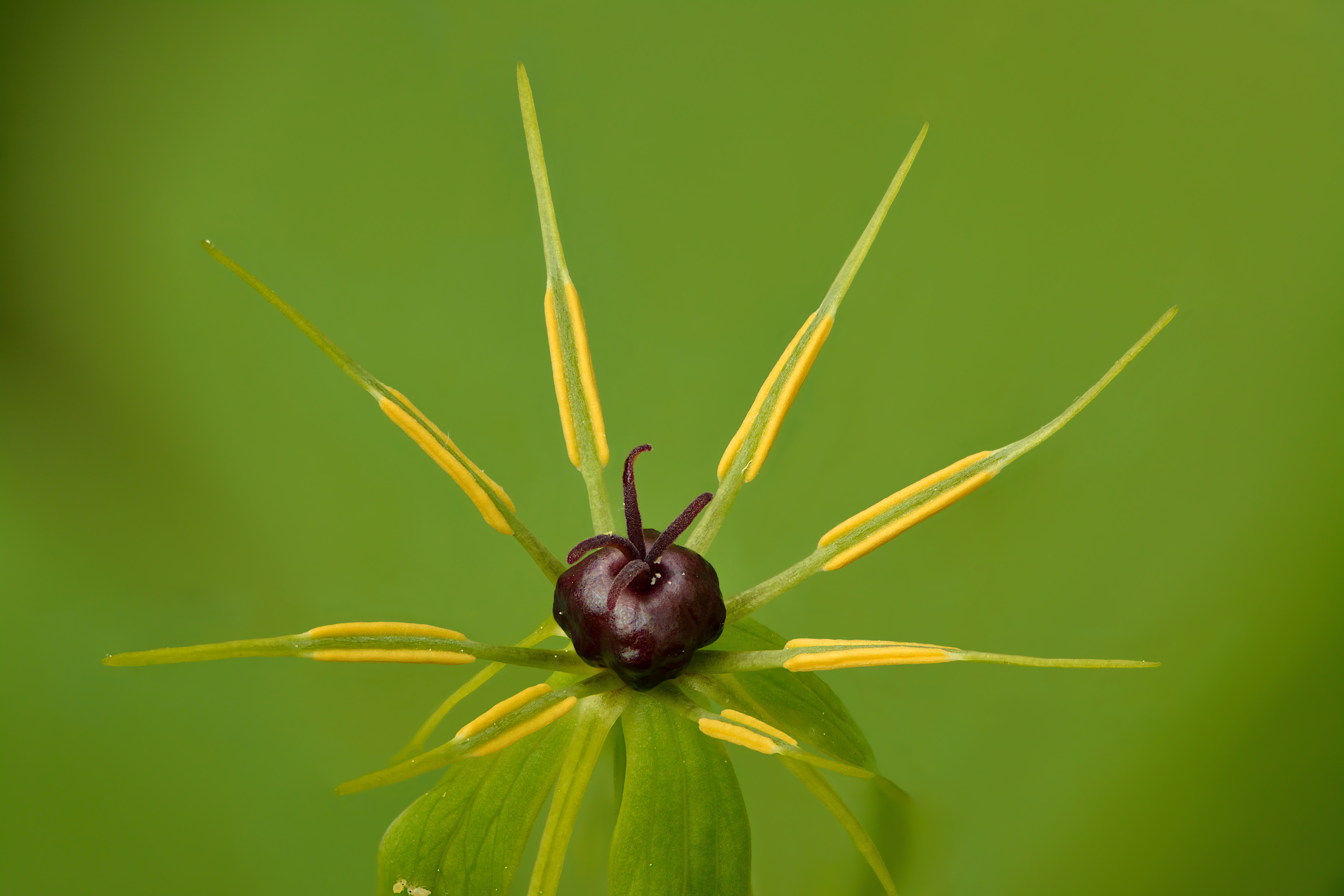
Flower

Paris quadrifolia, the herb Paris or true lover's knot, is a species of flowering plant in the family Melanthiaceae. It occurs in temperate and cool areas throughout Eurasia, from Spain to Yakutia, and from Iceland to Mongolia. It prefers calcareous soils and lives in damp and shady places, especially old established woods and stream banks.

P. quadrifolia is in decline in Europe due to loss of habitat. In Iceland, for example, it is on the red list.

== Description ==
P. quadrifolia is a perennial herbaceous plant that is 25 to 40 cm (10 to 15.5 in) tall. It may have 3–8 leaves but typically there are four leaves arranged as opposing pairs. The flowers are wispy and inconspicuous.

The plant flowers during the months of June and July. It has a solitary flower with four narrow greenish filiform (threadlike) petals, four green petaloid sepals, eight golden yellow stamens, and a round purple to red ovary. The flower is borne above a single whorl of four leaves.

Each plant produces at most one blueberry-like berry, which persists for an average of 46.2 days, and bears an average of 33.6 seeds per fruit. Fruits average 89.6% water, and their dry weight includes 14.5% carbohydrates and 2.6% lipids. The berry is poisonous, because it contains solanine, as are other plant tissues. Poisonings are rare because the plant's solitary berry has a repulsive taste that makes it difficult to mistake for a bilberry.

Raphides occur in at least the perianth, the stem, the smaller cells of the rhizome, and in abundance in the root. Its raphis-cells are elongated, pointed at the ends, and much longer than the contained raphides.

== Taxonomy ==
It was described by Carl Linnaeus in 1753.

== Ecology ==
In some patches studied by Ehrlén and Eriksson 1993, the small rodents Clethrionomys glareolus and Apodemus sp. removed up to 80% of the fruits. They are granivorous, consuming most of the seeds but only a small proportion of the fruit's pulp. As some seeds normally escape predation, they also act as seed dispersers.

=== Etymology ===
The specific epithet quadrifolia means four-leaved.

== Conservation ==
It is categorised as a species of Least Concern (LC) according to the IUCN red list.

== Gallery ==
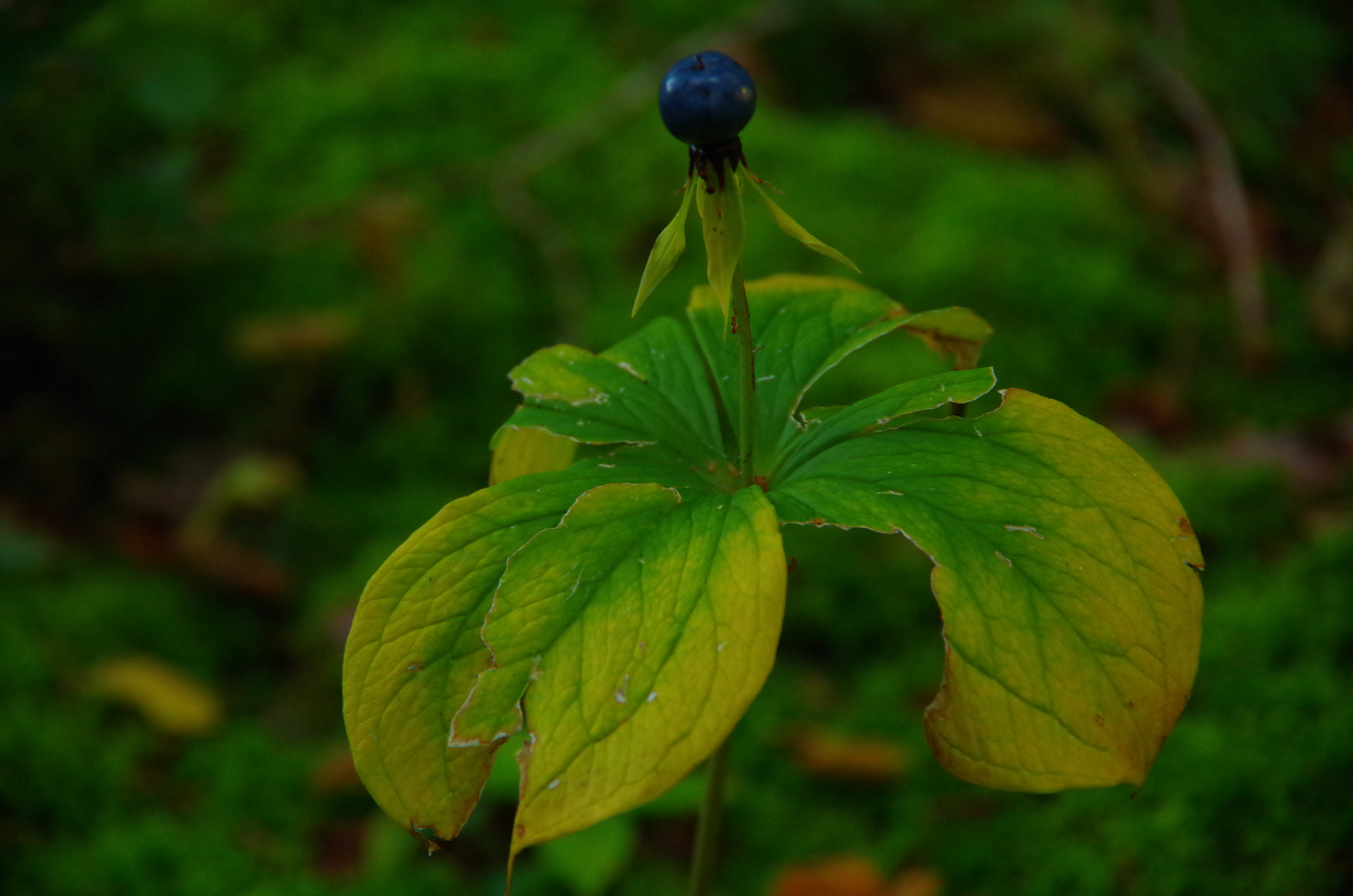
Herb Paris with Fruit

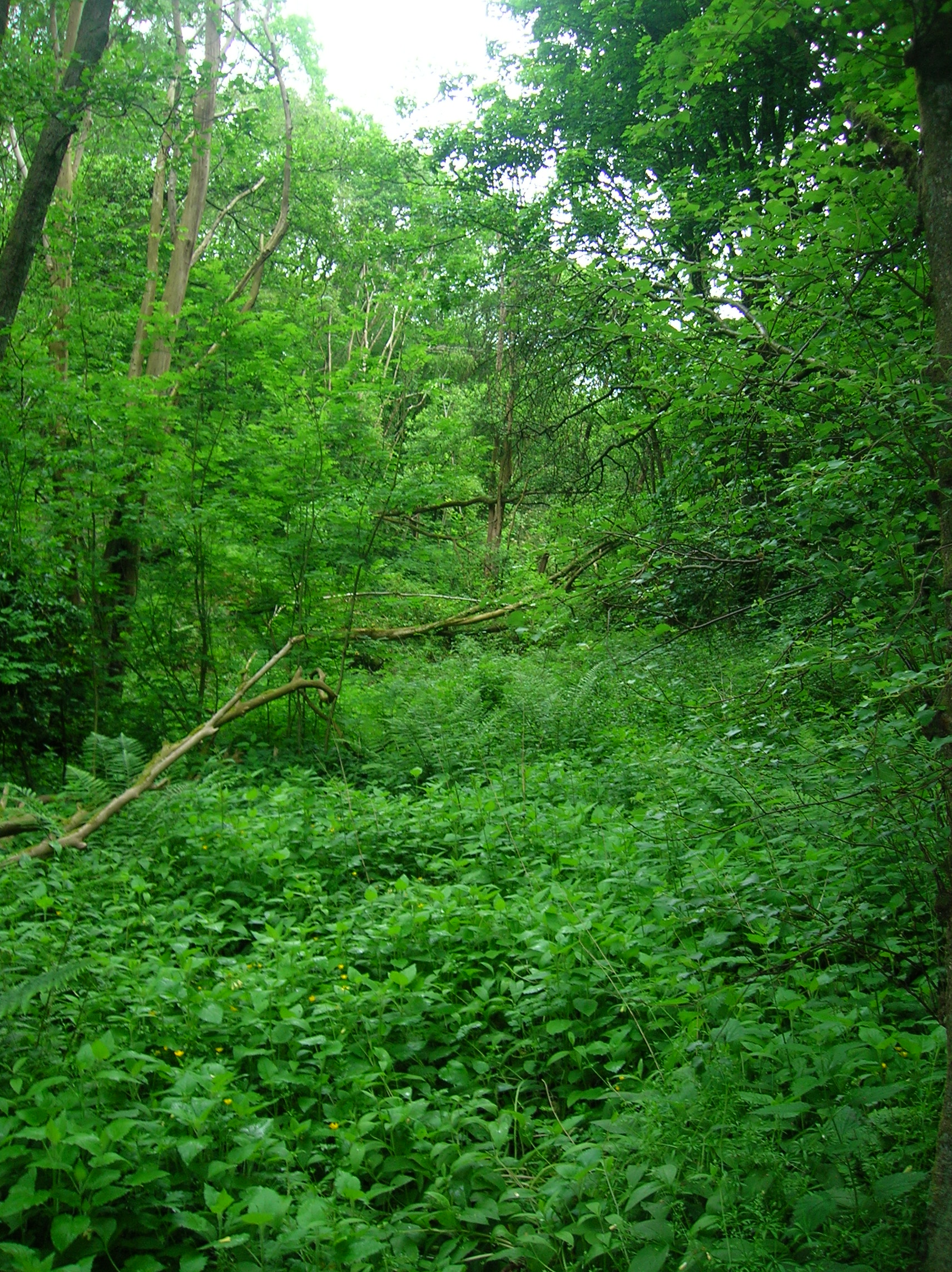
Typical Herb Paris woodland habitat in Ayrshire, Scotland.

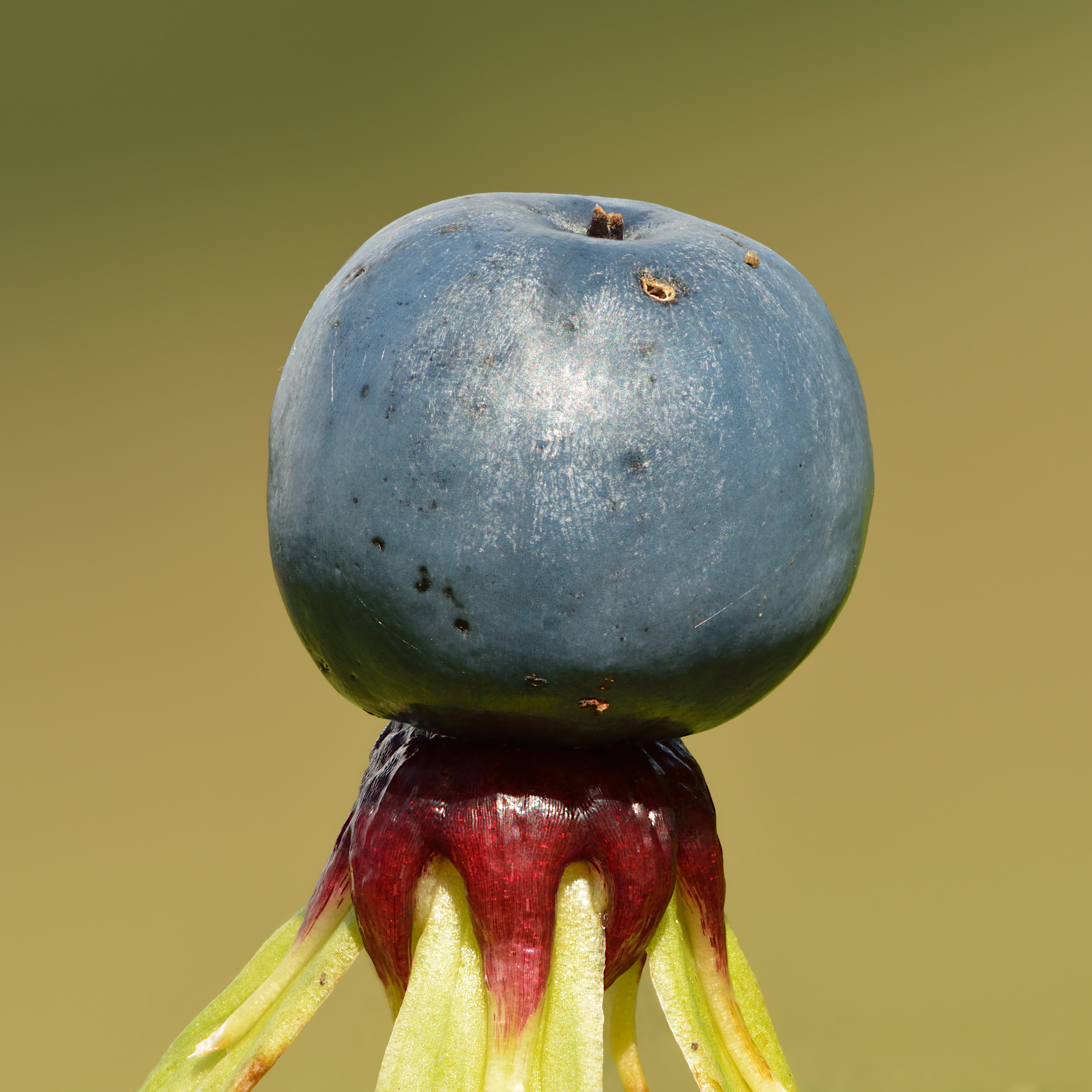
Fruit

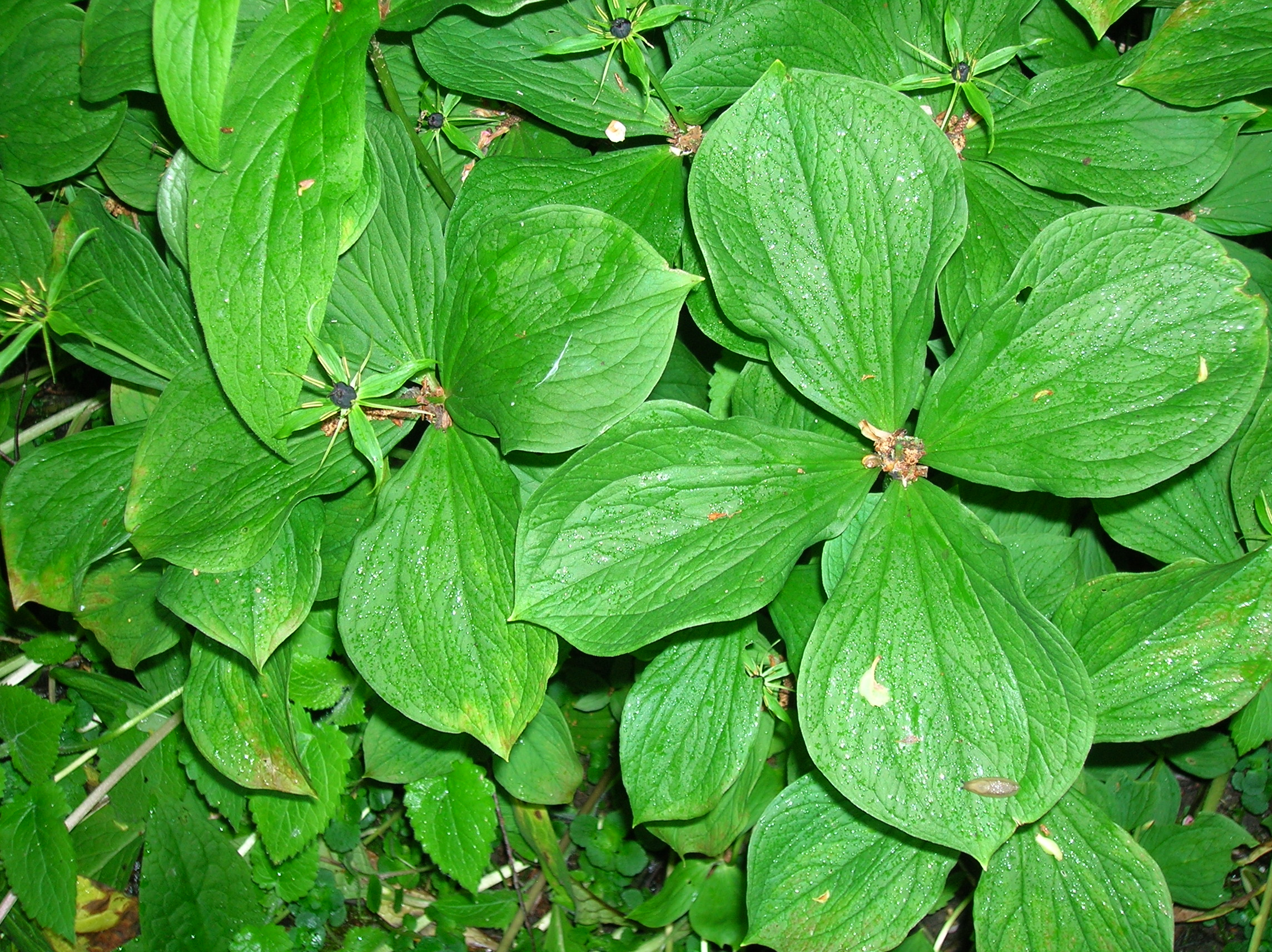
Details of the leaves.

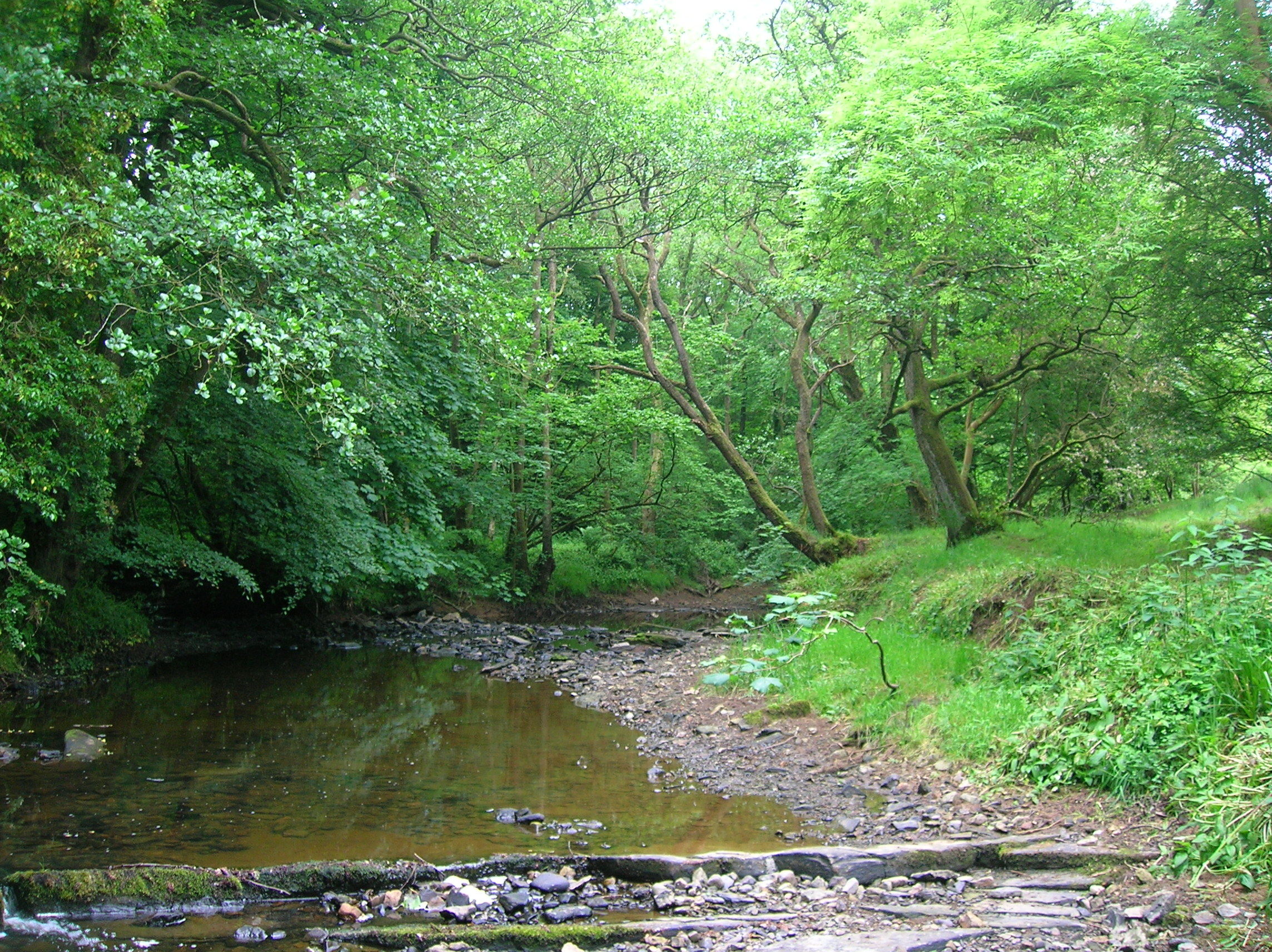
Typical limestone (cornstone) based woodlands rich in Herb Paris colonies.

== Bibliography ==
- Yeşil, Yeter; Özhatay, Fatma Neriman (2014-08-15). "Morphological, anatomical and karyological investigations on the genus Paris in Turkey". Biological Diversity and Conservation. 7 (2): 57–69. eISSN 1308-8084.
- Ehrlén, Johan; Eriksson, Ove (1993). "Toxicity in Fleshy Fruits: A Non-Adaptive Trait?". Oikos. 66 (1): 107–113. Bibcode:1993Oikos..66..107E. doi:10.2307/3545202. ISSN 0030-1299. JSTOR 3545202.
- Ehrlén, Johan; Eriksson, Ove (1991). "Phenological variation in fruit characteristics in vertebrate-dispersed plants". Oecologia. 86 (4): 463–470. Bibcode:1991Oecol..86..463E. doi:10.1007/BF00318311. ISSN 0029-8549. PMID 28313326.
- Gulliver, George (1869). "On Raphides, Sphæraphides, and Crystal Prisms: Especially as to how and where they may be easiest found and discriminated". Quarterly Journal of Microscopical Science. New Series. 9 (35): 232–241. doi:10.1242/jcs.S2-9.35.232a.
