= Dammarenediol II synthase =

Identifiers
- EC no.: 4.2.1.125
- CAS no.: 189354-84-5

Databases
- IntEnz: IntEnz view
- BRENDA: BRENDA entry
- ExPASy: NiceZyme view
- KEGG: KEGG entry
- MetaCyc: metabolic pathway
- PRIAM: profile
- PDB structures: RCSB PDB PDBe PDBsum
Search
- PMC: articles
- PubMed: articles
- NCBI: proteins

Dammarenediol II synthase (EC 4.2.1.125, dammarenediol synthase, 2,3-oxidosqualene (20S)-dammarenediol cyclase, DDS, (S)-squalene-2,3-epoxide hydro-lyase (dammarenediol-II forming)) is an enzyme with systematic name (3S)-2,3-epoxy-2,3-dihydrosqualene hydro-lyase (dammarenediol-II forming). This enzyme catalyses the following chemical reaction

dammarenediol II $\rightleftharpoons$ (3S)-2,3-epoxy-2,3-dihydrosqualene + H_{2}O

The reaction occurs in the reverse direction.
