= Protopanaxadiol =

Ginseng plant extract

Names
- IUPAC name Dammar-24-ene-3β,12β,20-triol
- Systematic IUPAC name (1S,3aR,3bR,5aR,7S,9aR,9bR,11R,11aR)-1-[(2S)-2-Hydroxy-6-methylhept-5-en-2-yl]-3a,3b,6,6,9a-pentamethylhexadecahydro-1H-cyclopenta[a]phenanthene-7,11-diol

Identifiers
CAS Number	7755-01-3
3D model (JSmol)	Interactive image
Abbreviations	PPD
ChEBI	CHEBI:76237
ChEMBL	ChEMBL375563
ChemSpider	8095918
KEGG	C20715
PubChem CID	9920281
UNII	P6717R7BP8
CompTox Dashboard (EPA)	DTXSID10952905
- InChI: InChI=1S/C30H52O3/c1-19(2)10-9-14-30(8,33)20-11-16-29(7)25(20)21(31)18-23-27(5)15-13-24(32)26(3,4)22(27)12-17-28(23,29)6/h10,20-25,31-33H,9,11-18H2,1-8H3/t20-,21+,22-,23+,24-,25-,27-,28+,29+,30+/m0/s1 Key: PYXFVCFISTUSOO-VUFVRDRTSA-N; InChI=1/C30H52O3/c1-19(2)10-9-14-30(8,33)20-11-16-29(7)25(20)21(31)18-23-27(5)15-13-24(32)26(3,4)22(27)12-17-28(23,29)6/h10,20-25,31-33H,9,11-18H2,1-8H3/t20-,21+,22-,23+,24-,25-,27-,28+,29+,30+/m0/s1 Key: PYXFVCFISTUSOO-VUFVRDRTBZ
- SMILES: CC(=CCC[C@@](C)([C@H]1CC[C@@]2([C@@H]1[C@@H](C[C@H]3[C@]2(CC[C@@H]4[C@@]3(CC[C@@H](C4(C)C)O)C)C)O)C)O)C

Properties
Chemical formula	C_{30}H_{52}O_{3}
Molar mass	460.743 g·mol^{−1}
- Except where otherwise noted, data are given for materials in their standard state (at 25 °C [77 °F], 100 kPa). verify (what is ?) Infobox references

Protopanaxadiol (PPD) is an organic compound that is an aglycone of ginsenosides, a group of steroid glycosides. It is a dammarane-type tetracyclic terpene sapogenin found in ginseng (Panax ginseng) and in notoginseng (Panax pseudoginseng) (as the 20(S) enantiomer).

The health effect of protopanaxadiol inside the human body is still unclear. One study suggests it has rapid, non-genomic effects on endothelial cells, binding to the glucocorticoid and oestrogen beta receptors. The study also showed an increase in intracellular calcium ion concentration.

Shanghai Innovative Research Center of Traditional Chinese Medicine (SIRC-TCM) is trying to develop an antidepressant based on this substance under the brand name Yoxintine. The drug has finished phase II trials as of May 2023. Results were published in November 2024.

A pharmacokinetic study done on phase IIa human volunteers reports the relationship between oral dose and blood plasma concentration, but no data is given for oral bioavailbility, half life, or volume of distribution. In rats, the oral bioavailbility is about 48% and the half-life is 6.25 hours when given as an extract containing both PPD and PPT. When given alone, reported bioavailbility values are lower, at 20.7–36.8%.

== See also ==
- Protopanaxatriol
