= Dammarane =

Names
- IUPAC name Dammarane
- Systematic IUPAC name (1R,3aR,3bR,5aS,9aS,9bR,11aR)-1-[(2R)-6-Methylheptan-2-yl]-3a,3b,6,6,9a-pentamethylhexadecahydro-1H-cyclopenta[a]phenanthrene

Identifiers
CAS Number	545-22-2
3D model (JSmol)	Interactive image
ChEBI	CHEBI:CHEBI:36488
ChemSpider	7827637
KEGG	C22609
MeSH	C102963
PubChem CID	9548714
CompTox Dashboard (EPA)	DTXSID20969680
- InChI: InChI=1S/C30H54/c1-21(2)11-9-12-22(3)23-15-19-29(7)24(23)13-14-26-28(6)18-10-17-27(4,5)25(28)16-20-30(26,29)8/h21-26H,9-20H2,1-8H3/t22-,23-,24-,25+,26-,28+,29-,30-/m1/s1 Key: OORMXZNMRWBSTK-LGFJJATJSA-N; InChI=1/C30H54/c1-21(2)11-9-12-22(3)23-15-19-29(7)24(23)13-14-26-28(6)18-10-17-27(4,5)25(28)16-20-30(26,29)8/h21-26H,9-20H2,1-8H3/t22-,23-,24-,25+,26-,28+,29-,30-/m1/s1 Key: OORMXZNMRWBSTK-LGFJJATJBV
- SMILES: C[C@H](CCCC(C)C)[C@H]1CC[C@@]2([C@@H]1CC[C@H]3[C@]2(CC[C@@H]4[C@@]3(CCCC4(C)C)C)C)C

Properties
Chemical formula	C_{30}H_{54}
Molar mass	414.75 g/mol
- Except where otherwise noted, data are given for materials in their standard state (at 25 °C [77 °F], 100 kPa). verify (what is ?) Infobox references

Dammarane is a tetracyclic triterpene found in sapogenins (forming triterpenoid saponins) like those of ginseng (ginsenosides: panaxatriol and protopanaxadiol). Compounds of the series were first isolated from and named after dammar resin, a natural resin from the tropical trees of the dipterocarp family.
