= Isoarborinol =

Chemical compound

Names
- IUPAC name 5⍺-Arborin-9(11)-en-3β-ol
- Systematic IUPAC name (3S,3aS,5aS,5bS,7aR,9S,11aS,13aR,13bS)-3a,5a,8,8,11a,13a-Hexamethyl-3-(propan-2-yl)-2,3,3a,4,5,5a,5b,6,7,7a,8,9,10,11,11a,13,13a,13b-octadecahydro-1H-cyclopenta[a]chrysen-9-ol
- Other names 3β-Arborinol, Arborinol B, Sorghumol

Identifiers
CAS Number	5532-41-2
3D model (JSmol)	Interactive image
ChEBI	CHEBI:80835
ChemSpider	16737410
KEGG	C16973
PubChem CID	12305182
UNII	74JE8XL7LQ
CompTox Dashboard (EPA)	DTXSID201170654
- InChI: InChI=1S/C30H50O/c1-19(2)20-9-12-24-28(20,6)17-18-29(7)22-10-11-23-26(3,4)25(31)14-15-27(23,5)21(22)13-16-30(24,29)8/h13,19-20,22-25,31H,9-12,14-18H2,1-8H3/t20-,22+,23-,24-,25-,27+,28-,29-,30+/m0/s1 Key: VWYANPOOORUCFJ-MBVQSDBHSA-N
- SMILES: CC(C)[C@@H]1CC[C@H]2[C@]1(CC[C@@]3([C@@]2(CC=C4[C@H]3CC[C@@H]5[C@@]4(CC[C@@H](C5(C)C)O)C)C)C)C

Properties
Chemical formula	C_{30}H_{50}O
Molar mass	426.729 g·mol^{−1}
Appearance	Solid powder
- Except where otherwise noted, data are given for materials in their standard state (at 25 °C [77 °F], 100 kPa). Infobox references

Isoarborinol is a triterpenoid ubiquitously produced by angiosperms and is thus considered a biomarker for higher plants. Though no isoarborinol-producing microbe has been identified, isoarborinol is also considered a possible biomarker for marine bacteria, as its diagenetic end product, arborane, has been found in ancient marine sediments that predate the rise of plants. Importantly, isoarborinol may represent the phylogenetic link between hopanols and sterols.

== Chemistry ==
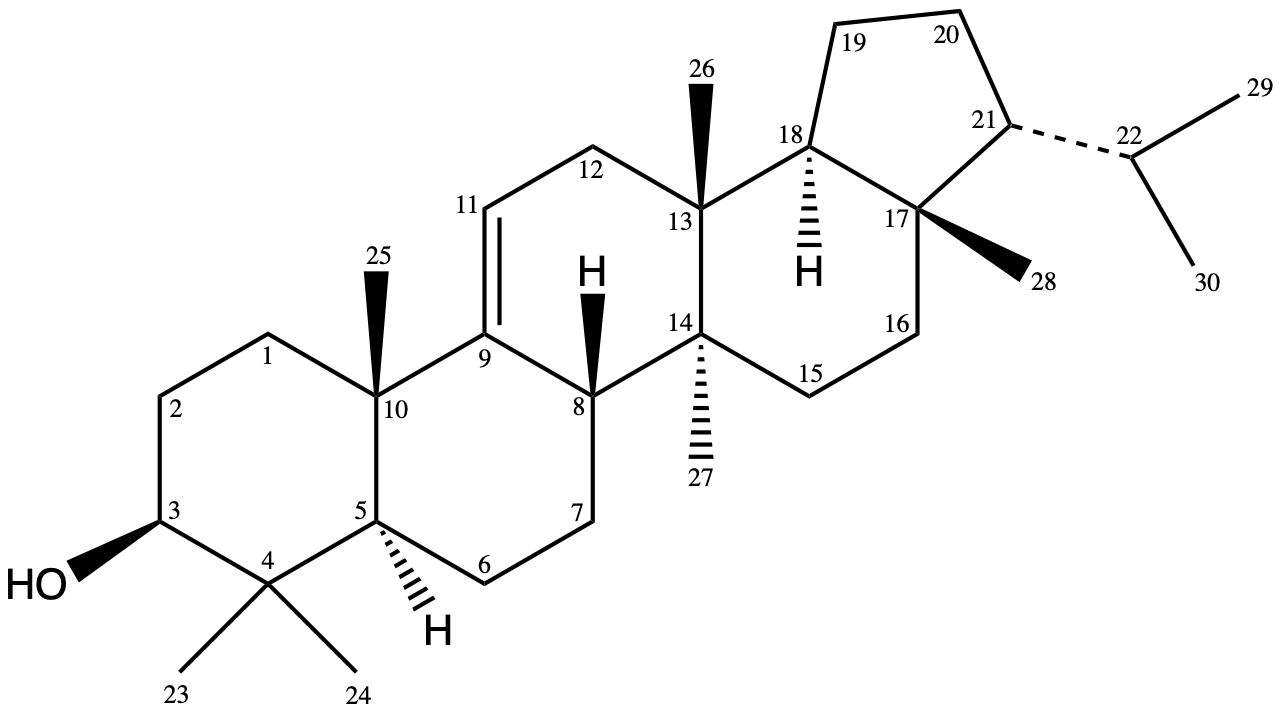
Isoarborinol with carbon numbering

Isoarborinol is a pentacyclic triterpenoid, a class of 30-carbon isoprenoid compounds commonly found in higher plants. It is primarily a hydrocarbon molecule composed of four cyclohexane rings, one cyclopentane ring, six methyl groups, one alcohol group and one isopropyl group. It is structurally similar to plant cyclics in the lupenoid series (including lupeol, betulin and lupane), primarily differing in the position of the isobutyl functional group (located on C_{21} of the cyclopental ring for isoarborinol, and on C_{19} for the lupenoids). Isoarborinol likely serves as a fluidity-buffering component of biological membranes, similar to sterols and hopanols.

== Distribution ==
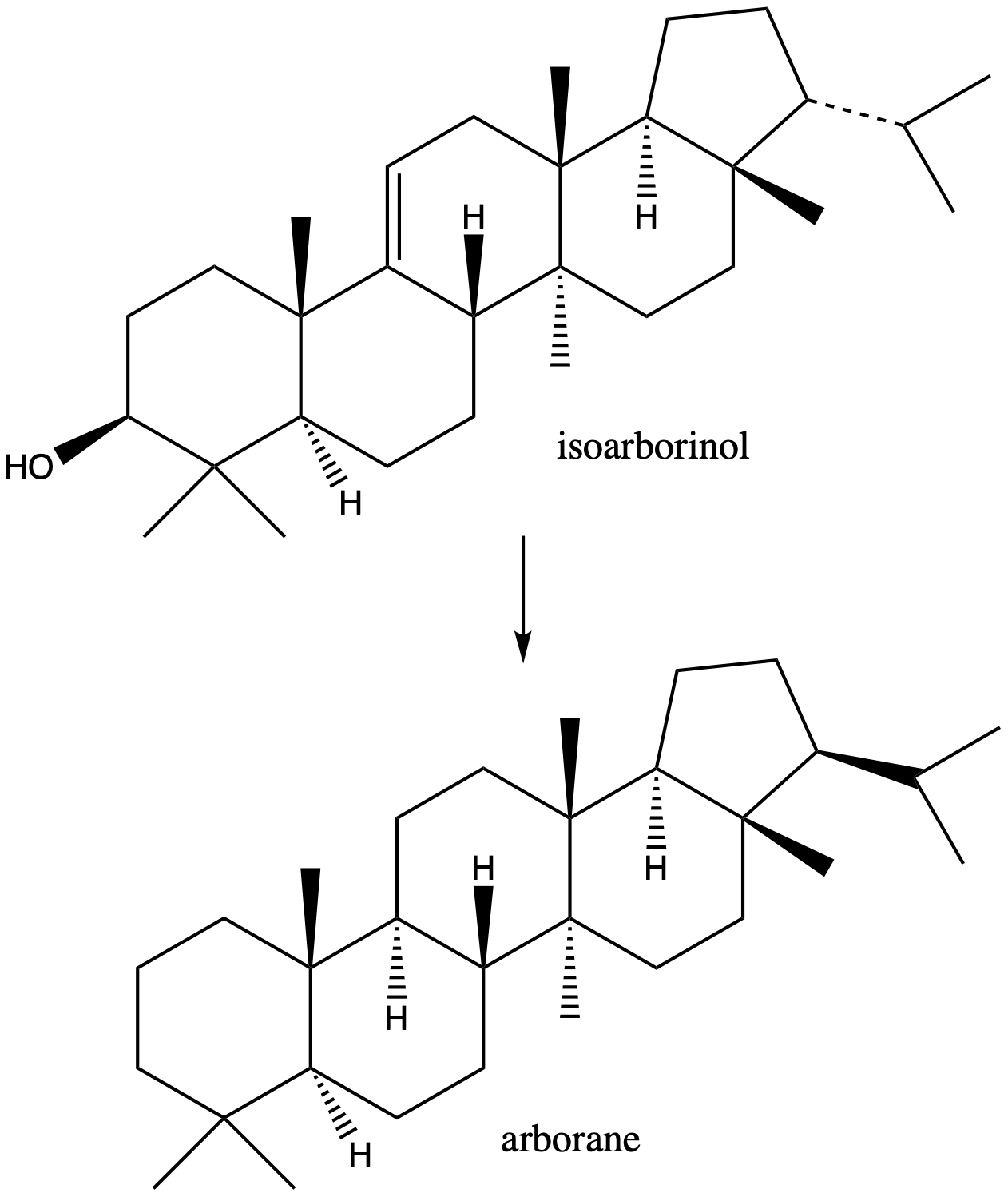
During diagenesis, isoarborinol loses its hydroxyl group and becomes saturated. Arborane is the diagenetic end product of isoarborinol that gets preserved in the geologic record.

The known distribution of isoarborinol in extant organisms is predominantly limited to a few angiosperms (e.g., the family Gramineae), which led many to view isoarborinol as a biomarker for higher plants. In the 1990s, a series of papers published by Verena Hauke and colleagues presented compelling evidence for the existence of isoarborinol during the Permian and Triassic periods based on detection of arborane (the diagenetic product of isoarborinol) in ancient sediments. These geological periods significantly predate the late-Jurassic first appearance of angiosperms, precluding the possibility that isoarborinol was produced by higher plants. Furthermore, the arborane compounds detected had carbon isotopic signatures inconsistent with plant origin, and arborane was additionally isolated from lacustrine sediments that lacked angiosperms. Taken together, these observations support a microbial origin for isoarborinol, though no isoarborinol-producing microbe has yet been found. However, the marine heterotrophic bacterium Eudoraea adriatica was discovered to make adriaticol and eudoraenol, two isomers of isoarborinol, suggesting that an extant isoarborinol producer may exist.

== Evolutionary significance ==
Structures of precursors and final products of hopanol, isoarborinol and two sterols (cycloartenol and lanosterol).

The enzyme responsible for making isoarborinol may represent the evolutionary link between the hopanol-producing enzymes in bacteria and the sterol-producing enzymes in eukaryotes. These enzymes are part of the class of terpene cyclases, which cyclize either squalene or oxidosqualene into four- or five-membered ring compounds through pathways that proceed through different structural conformations (all-chair or chair-boat-chair). Each terpene cyclase uses a different combination of these aspects to produce the final polycyclic triterpenoid compound, leading to great variety in the pathways of polycyclic triterpenoid production.

Squalene-hopene cyclase (SHC) synthesizes hopanols and is generally assumed to have evolved before the sterol-producing enzyme oxidosqualene cyclase (OSC). Whereas SHC folds squalene into a five-membered ring via an all-chair conformation intermediate, OSC folds oxidosqualene into a four-membered ring via a chair-boat-chair conformation. Isoarborinol cyclase uses a combination of these aspects, cyclizing oxidosqualene into a five-membered ring via a chair-boat-chair conformation. Given the apparent intermediate nature of its pathway (between those used by SHC and OSC), isoarborinol cyclase has been proposed to represent the enzymatic intermediate of the evolutionary transition from SHC to OSC. However, phylogenetic analyses of the evolutionary relationships between terpene cyclases suggest that SHC and OSC diverged from a common ancestor, which renders the evolutionary significance of isoarborinol cyclase unclear. Though no extant microbe is known to produce isoarborinol, the discovery of eudoraenol synthase (which produces isoarborinol-like lipids through a similar pathway used by isoarborinol cyclase) in E. adriatica opens the door for future investigations into the mechanisms of polycyclic triterpenoid biomarker synthesis and the phylogenetic relationships between the enzymes involved.

== Measurement ==
In extant organisms, isoarborinol can be found in its intact form with its polar hydroxyl group. In sediments, isoarborinol is diagenetically converted to its fully saturated form, arborane. Thus, techniques designed to extract and analyze isoarborinol must consider the chemistry of the molecule being interrogated. Common approaches to analyzing biomarker compounds include identifying their structures, quantifying their abundances and measuring the isotopic compositions of their various elements (carbon, nitrogen, sulfur, etc.).

=== Extraction and purification ===
Isoarborinol can be extracted from biological material via Bligh and Dyer, while arborane can be extracted from sedimentary rocks via solvent extraction. Column chromatography (often high-performance liquid chromatography (HPLC)) is used to partition the lipids into different phases (e.g., saturates, aromatics and polars) based on their polarities. Isoarborinol will elute with the polar fraction and its alcohol group must often be derivatized (e.g., with TMS, TFA or methanol) before it can be analyzed. Arborane will elute with the aromatic fraction and does not need to be derivatized before analysis.

=== Analysis ===
Isoarborinol and arborane can be analyzed via gas chromatography-mass spectrometry (GC/MS), during which compounds elute based on their partitioning properties between the mobile and stationary phases of the GC column, then are subsequently fragmented and ionized, and the resulting charged fragments are separated based on their mass-to-charge ratios (m/z). Together, information about the relative retention times and mass spectra patterns of molecules are used to identify compounds of interest. For isoarborinol derivatized with TMS, a characteristic mass fragment peak is found at m/z = 241. Alternatively, isoarborinol and/or arborane can also be analyzed via liquid chromatography-mass spectrometry (LC/MS) or characterized by nuclear magnetic resonance (NMR). The carbon and hydrogen isotopic ratios in isoarborinol/arborane can be measured via gas chromatography coupled to isotope ratio mass spectrometry.
