= C30H52 =

The molecular formula C_{30}H_{52} may refer to:

- Arborane
- Cycloartane
- Dammarene
- Fernane
- Friedelane
- Gammacerane
- Gorgostane
- Hopane
- Lupane (compound)
- Neohopane
- Oleanane
- Ursane
