= Lanosterol synthase =

Mammalian protein found in Homo sapiens

lanosterol synthase

Identifiers
- EC no.: 5.4.99.7
- CAS no.: 9032-71-7

Databases
- BRENDA: enzyme data
- ExPASy: NiceZyme view
- KEGG: enzyme entry
- MetaCyc: metabolic pathway
- Rhea: reactions
- PDB structures: RCSB PDB PDBe PDBsum
- Gene Ontology: AmiGO / QuickGO
Search
- PMC: articles
- PubMed: articles
- NCBI: proteins

LSS
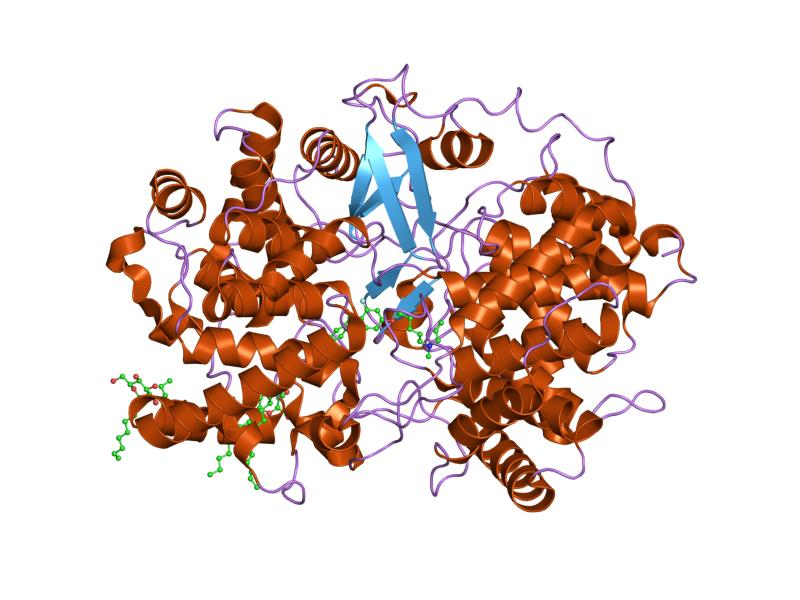

Identifiers
- Aliases: LSS, OSC, CTRCT44, lanosterol synthase (2,3-oxidosqualene-lanosterol cyclase), lanosterol synthase, HYPT14, APMR4
- External IDs: OMIM: 600909; MGI: 1336155; GeneCards: LSS
Available structures
PDB	Ortholog search: PDBe RCSB
PDB	List of PDB id codes 1W6J, 1W6K
Enzyme activity
EC #	BRENDA	ExPASy	KEGG	MetaCyc
5.4.99.7	↗	↗	↗	↗

Gene location (Human)
Chr.	Chromosome 21 (human)
Band	21q22.3	Start	46,188,141 bp
Band	21q22.3	End	46,228,824 bp

Gene location (Mouse)
Chr.	Chromosome 10 (mouse)
Band	10 C1|10 39.1 cM	Start	76,367,422 bp
Band	10 C1|10 39.1 cM	End	76,392,972 bp
RNA expression pattern
Bgee	Human / Mouse (ortholog); Top expressed in: gastric mucosa; C1 segment; skin of leg; right ovary; skin of abdomen; corpus callosum; pituitary gland; right hemisphere of cerebellum; ventricular zone; left ovary / Top expressed in: lip; epithelium of small intestine; skin of external ear; Ileal epithelium; Paneth cell; hair follicle; gastrula; transitional epithelium of urinary bladder; sciatic nerve; ciliary body; More reference expression data
BioGPS	n/a
Gene ontology
Molecular function	isomerase activity; intramolecular transferase activity; lanosterol synthase activity; beta-amyrin synthase activity
Cellular component	lipid droplet; endoplasmic reticulum membrane; endoplasmic reticulum; membrane
Biological process	regulation of protein stability; lipid metabolism; steroid biosynthetic process; cholesterol biosynthetic process; regulation of cholesterol biosynthetic process; triterpenoid biosynthetic process
Sources:Amigo / QuickGO
Orthologs
Databases	NCBI: entry; OMA: entry
Species	Human	Mouse
Entrez	4047	16987
Ensembl	ENSG00000160285; ENSG00000281289	ENSMUSG00000033105
UniProt	P48449	Q8BLN5
RefSeq (mRNA)	NM_001001438; NM_001145436; NM_001145437; NM_002340	NM_146006
RefSeq (protein)	NP_001001438; NP_001138908; NP_001138909; NP_002331	NP_666118
Location (UCSC)	Chr 21: 46.19 – 46.23 Mb	Chr 10: 76.37 – 76.39 Mb
PubMed search
- Wikidata
View/Edit Human	View/Edit Mouse

Lanosterol synthase (EC 5.4.99.7) is an oxidosqualene cyclase (OSC) enzyme that converts (S)-2,3-oxidosqualene to a protosterol cation and finally to lanosterol. Lanosterol is a key four-ringed intermediate in cholesterol biosynthesis. In humans, lanosterol synthase is encoded by the LSS gene.

In eukaryotes, lanosterol synthase is an integral monotopic protein associated with the cytosolic side of the endoplasmic reticulum. Some evidence suggests that the enzyme is a soluble, non-membrane bound protein in the few prokaryotes that produce it.

Due to the enzyme's role in cholesterol biosynthesis, there is interest in lanosterol synthase inhibitors as potential cholesterol-reducing drugs, to complement existing statins.

== Structure ==
Lanosterol synthase is a two-domain monomeric protein composed of two connected (α/α) barrel domains and three smaller β-structures. The enzyme active site is in the center of the protein, closed off by a constricted channel. Passage of the (S)-2,3-epoxysqualene substrate through the channel requires a change in protein conformation. In eukaryotes, a hydrophobic surface (6% of the total enzyme surface area) is the ER membrane-binding region.

The enzyme contains five fingerprint regions containing Gln-Trp motifs, which are also present in the highly analogous bacterial enzyme squalene-hopene cyclase. Residues of these fingerprint regions contain stacked sidechains which are thought to contribute to enzyme stability during the highly exergonic cyclization reactions catalyzed by the enzyme.

== Function ==
=== Lanosterol synthesis ===
Lanosterol synthase catalyzes the conversion of (S)-2,3-epoxysqualene to lanosterol, a key four-ringed intermediate in cholesterol biosynthesis. Thus, it in turn provides the precursor to estrogens, androgens, progestogens, glucocorticoids, mineralocorticoids, and neurosteroids. In eukaryotes the enzyme is bound to the cytosolic side of the endoplasmic reticulum membrane. While cholesterol synthesis is mostly associated with eukaryotes, few prokaryotes have been found to express lanosterol synthase; it has been found as a soluble protein in Methylococcus capsulatus.

=== Epoxylanosterol synthesis ===
Lanosterol synthase also catalyzes the cyclization of 2,3;22,23-diepoxysqualene to 24(S),25-epoxylanosterol, which is later converted to 24(S),25-epoxycholesterol. Since the enzyme affinity for this second substrate is greater than for the monoepoxy (S)-2,3-epoxysqualene, under partial inhibition conversion of 2,3;22,23-diepoxysqualene to 24(S),25-epoxylanosterol is favored over lanosterol synthesis. This has relevance for disease prevention and treatment.

== Mechanism ==
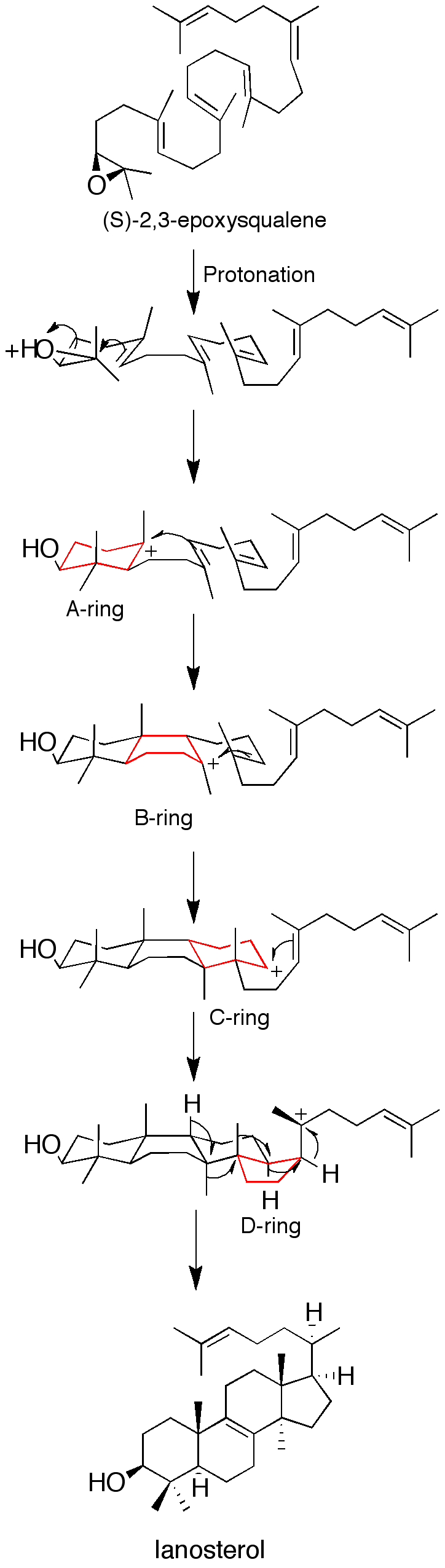
Figure 1: Lanosterol synthase mechanism. The discrete carbocation intermediates show the non-concerted nature of the mechanism.

Though some data on the mechanism has been obtained by the use of suicide inhibitors, mutagenesis studies, and homology modeling, it is still not fully understood how the enzyme catalyzes the formation of lanosterol.

=== Ring opening ===
Before the acquisition of the protein's X-ray crystal structure, site-directed mutagenesis was used to determine residues key to the enzyme's catalytic activity. It was determined that an aspartic acid residue (D455) and two histidine residues (H146 and H234) were essential to enzyme function. Corey et al. hypothesized that the aspartic acid acts by protonating the substrate's epoxide ring, thus increasing its susceptibility to intramolecular attack by the nearest double bond, with H146 possibly intensifying the proton donor ability of the aspartic acid through hydrogen bonding. After acquisition of the X-ray crystal structure of the enzyme, the role of D455 as a proton donor to the substrate's epoxide was confirmed, though it was found that D455 is more likely stabilized by hydrogen bonding from two cysteine residues (C456 and C533) than from the earlier suggested histidine.

=== Ring formation ===
Epoxide protonation activates the substrate, setting off a cascade of ring forming reactions. Four rings in total (A through D) are formed, producing the cholesterol backbone. Though the idea of a concerted formation of all four rings had been entertained in the past, kinetic studies with (S)-2,3-oxidosqualene analogs showed that product formation is achieved through discrete carbocation intermediates (see Figure 1). Isolation of monocyclic and bicyclic products from lanosterol synthase mutants has further weakened the hypothesis of a concerted mechanism. Evidence suggests that epoxide ring opening and A ring formation is concerted, though.

== Clinical significance ==
=== Enzyme inhibitors as cholesterol-lowering drugs ===
Interest has grown in lanosterol synthase inhibitors as drugs to lower blood cholesterol and treat atherosclerosis. The widely popular statin drugs currently used to lower LDL (low-density lipoprotein) cholesterol function by inhibiting HMG-CoA reductase activity. Because this enzyme catalyzes the formation of precursors far upstream of (S)-2,3-epoxysqualene and cholesterol, statins may negatively influence amounts of intermediates required for other biosynthetic pathways (e.g. synthesis of isoprenoids, coenzyme Q). Thus, lanosterol synthase, which is more closely tied to cholesterol biosynthesis than HMG-CoA reductase, is an attractive drug target.

Lanosterol synthase inhibitors are thought to lower LDL and VLDL cholesterol by a dual control mechanism. Studies in which lanosterol synthase is partially inhibited have shown both a direct decrease in lanosterol formation and a decrease in HMG-CoA reductase activity. The oxysterol 24(S),25-epoxylanosterol, which is preferentially formed over lanosterol during partial lanosterol synthase inhibition, is believed to be responsible for this inhibition of HMG-CoA reductase activity.

== Evolution ==
It is believed that oxidosqualene cyclases (OSCs, the class to which lanosterol cyclase belongs) evolved from bacterial squalene-hopene cyclase (SHC), which is involved with the formation of hopanoids. Phylogenetic trees constructed from the amino acid sequences of OSCs in diverse organisms suggest a single common ancestor, and that the synthesis pathway evolved only once. The discovery of steranes including cholestane in 2.7-billion year-old shales from Pilbara Craton, Australia, suggests that eukaryotes with OSCs and complex steroid machinery were present early in earth's history.
