= Tetrahymanol =

Names
- IUPAC name Gammaceran-3β-ol
- Systematic IUPAC name (3S,4aR,6aR,6bR,8aS,12aS,12bR,14aR,14bR)-4,4,6a,6b,9,9,12a,14b-Octamethyldocosahydropicen-3-ol

Identifiers
CAS Number	2130-17-8
3D model (JSmol)	Interactive image
ChEBI	CHEBI:9493
ChEMBL	ChEMBL485801
ChemSpider	147779
KEGG	C06083
PubChem CID	168951
CompTox Dashboard (EPA)	DTXSID60943803
- InChI: InChI=1S/C30H52O/c1-25(2)15-9-16-27(5)20(25)12-18-29(7)22(27)10-11-23-28(6)17-14-24(31)26(3,4)21(28)13-19-30(23,29)8/h20-24,31H,9-19H2,1-8H3/t20-,21-,22+,23+,24-,27-,28-,29+,30+/m0/s1 Key: BFNSRKHIVITRJP-VJBYBJRLSA-N; InChI=1S/C30H52O/c1-25(2)15-9-16-27(5)20(25)12-18-29(7)22(27)10-11-23-28(6)17-14-24(31)26(3,4)21(28)13-19-30(23,29)8/h20-24,31H,9-19H2,1-8H3/t20-,21-,22+,23+,24-,27-,28-,29+,30+/m0/s1 Key: BFNSRKHIVITRJP-VJBYBJRLSA-N
- SMILES: C[C@]12CCCC([C@@H]1CC[C@@]3([C@@H]2CC[C@H]4[C@]3(CC[C@@H]5[C@@]4(CC[C@@H](C5(C)C)O)C)C)C)(C)C

Properties
Chemical formula	C_{30}H_{52}O
Molar mass	428.745 g·mol^{−1}
- Except where otherwise noted, data are given for materials in their standard state (at 25 °C [77 °F], 100 kPa). Infobox references

Tetrahymanol is a gammacerane-type membrane lipid first found in the marine ciliate Tetrahymena pyriformis. It was later found in other ciliates, fungi, ferns, and bacteria. After being deposited in sediments that compress into sedimentary rocks over millions of years, tetrahymanol is dehydroxylated into gammacerane. Gammacerane has been interpreted as a proxy for ancient water column stratification.

== Chemistry ==
=== Structure ===
Tetrahymanol is a pentacyclic triterpenoid molecule. The triterpenoids are a class of molecules found in both bacteria and eukaryotes, which largely make hopanols and sterols, respectively. The structures of these three classes of molecules are shown below. Cholesterol and diploptene are used as model sterol and hopanol structures, respectively. While diploptene and tetrahymanol broadly have similar structures, the fifth ring on tetrahymanol is a cyclohexane rather than a cyclopentane. All three of these molecular classes have structures that lend themselves to membrane rigidity and other, still unknown, physiological functions. The similarity of tetrahymanol to the other classes of triterpenoid molecules allows it to substitute for hopanols and sterols in cell membranes.

The tetrahymanol structure can have multiple stereoisomers. Its chiral methyl and hydrogen substituents can switch enantiomers during diagenesis, giving the molecule different properties with each isomer. When gammacerane, the diagenetic product of tetrahymanol, is analyzed, its isomers can be separated and provide information about the origin and thermal maturity of the sample.

=== Biosynthesis ===
The molecular structures of cholesterol (left), tetrahymanol (center), and diploptene (right)

All triterpenoids are synthesized via the cyclization of the C_{30} isoprenoid chain, squalene. Eukaryotes use oxidosqualene cyclase and several other enzymes to create the tetracyclic skeleton found in steroids, a process that requires molecular oxygen. Bacteria use a similar enzyme (shc) to create the pentacyclic hopanoid precursor, diploptene; however, this biosynthesis does not require oxygen. It was recently discovered that tetrahymanol-producing bacteria form diploptene using shc then elongate the final cyclopentane into a fifth ring using tetrahymanol synthase (ths). It is unknown whether bacteria modify diploptene into other hopene molecules before creating tetrahymanol. It has also been found with a methylation at the C-3 site.

Eukaryotes that live in anaerobic environments cannot synthesize their own sterols because of a lack of molecular oxygen. These organisms can gain sterols through predation. However, there can be times of sterol starvation. Tetrahymanol biosynthesis does not require oxygen, and can substitute readily for sterols. It is hypothesized that ciliates synthesize tetrahymanol in response to lack of oxygen and exogenous sterols. The gene for tetrahymanol synthase was found in the genomes of many genera of alpha-, delta-, and gammaproteobacteria, including Rhodopseudomonas, Bradyrhizobium and Methylomicrobium.

== Use as a lipid biomarker ==
Tetrahymanol has been found in many marine ciliates at relatively high concentrations, suggesting it may be a useful biomarker in the Earth's rock record. During diagenesis, the alcohol functional group is lost and tetrahymanol becomes gammacerane. Like other saturated triterpenoid skeletons, gammacerane is a highly stable molecule that can preserved in rocks on geological timescales. The oldest gammacerane biomarker was found in a rock 850 million years old.

Based on microbial physiology studies, gammacerane was suggested as a potential biomarker for ocean stratification. When water columns stratify, anoxic conditions can form in the bottom waters. Ciliates living in these conditions must adapt to produce lipids that do not require molecular oxygen for their biosynthesis. A direct correlation between sterol availability and tetrahymanol synthesis in ciliates has been shown, leading to the hypothesis that gammacerane in sediments is a biomarker for ocean stratification.

This hypothesis was later met with skepticism. While tetrahymanol had mostly been observed in ciliates, several bacteria were then shown to synthesize the lipid and many bacteria across multiple phyla had the gene for tetrahymanol synthase. This evidence has been used to question the potential of gammacerane as a biomarker for water column stratification. For instance, aerobic methanotrophic bacteria were shown to synthesize tetrahymanol. Thus it is not solely a response to anoxic environments. Also, alphaproteobacteria present a potentially large source of the lipid in the rock record. It has been suggested that these organisms may be synthesizing gammacerane in response to other shifting parameters during water column stratification, as most of the bacteria that contain the ths gene thrive in dynamic environments.

== Measurement ==
=== Gas chromatography ===
After extracting rocks or live samples with organic solvents, tetrahymanol, gammacerane, and other lipids can be separated using gas chromatography. This technique separates molecules based on their polarity and size, which both inversely affect boiling point. As a compound's boiling point increases, it spends more time as a condensed liquid in the bonded liquid stationary phase of the GC column. More volatile compounds will partition into the gaseous mobile phase and have a short elution time. Before injection onto the chromatographic column, the alcohol substituent on tetrahymanol is acetylated with acetic anhydride, allowing it to volatilize and enter the GC.

=== Liquid chromatography ===
Similar to gas chromatography, liquid chromatography is used to separate molecules before detection; however, LC has a liquid mobile phase. After growing modern microbes that synthesize tetrahymanol, many of the biomolecules are too polar to separate on GC, so LC is used to characterize the abundance of different lipids. There are two main types of LC: normal and reversed phase. In the former, the stationary phase is polar and the mobile phase becomes increasingly non-polar as the separation proceeds. Reversed phase chromatography is the inverse of this set up, non-polar stationary phase with polar mobile phase.

=== Mass spectrometry ===
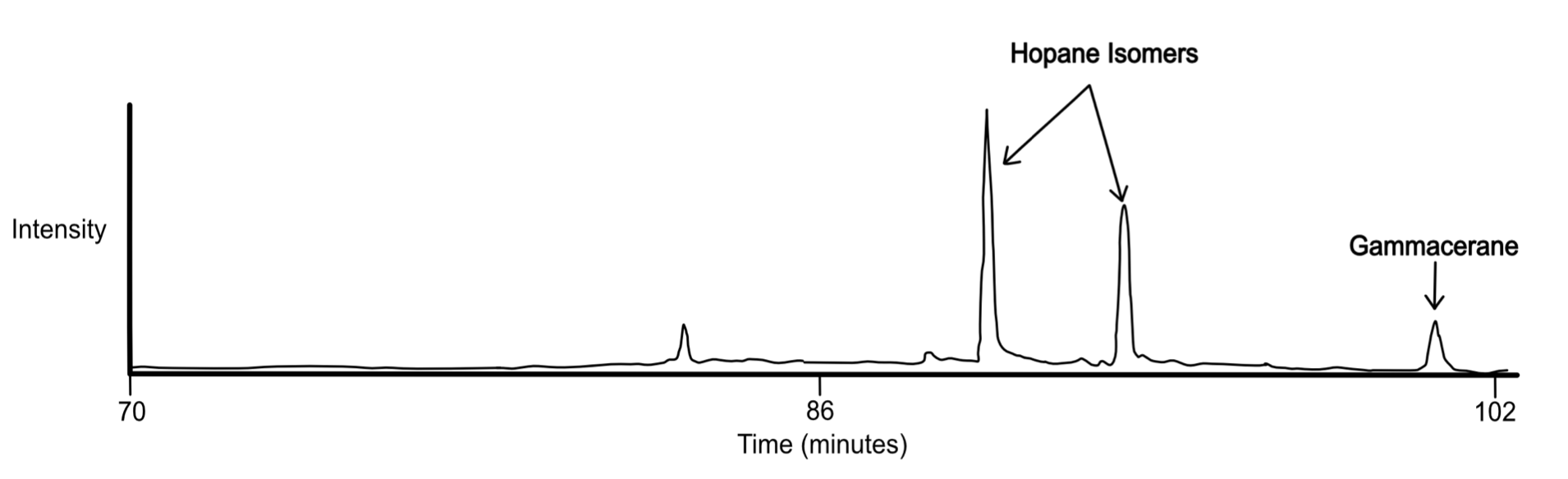
A MS/MS chromatogram of the 412 --> 191 m/z transition that highlights two hopane isomers that have a molecular ion of 412 and gammacerane. Figure adapted from Summons, 1988.

After the lipids are separated on the GC or LC column they are detected using mass spectrometry (MS). Mass spectrometry characterizes the mass of a given molecule by first fragmenting and ionizing the molecule into smaller carbocations known as daughter ions. Each molecule has a diagnostic fragmentation pattern in a given ion source. Classes of molecules often have a characteristic fragment ion that can be used to search for those molecules in a total ion current. This is known as a selected ion chromatogram (SIC). SICs are used in single quadrupole mass spectrometers. When two quadrupoles are attached in tandem mass spectrometry (MS/MS), two mass fragments can be isolated simultaneously. MS/MS experiments allow the total ion current to be filtered by both the molecular ion and the characteristic fragment ion of a given molecule. The molecular ion of gammacerane with an electron impact source is 412 m/z. Like other pentacyclic triterpenoids, it has a characteristic 191 m/z mass fragment. The combination of 412 m/z and 191 m/z is known as the 412-->191 m/z transition and can be used to search a chromatogram specifically for gammacerane.

== Case study ==
In 1988, Summons et al. studied the Proterozoic Kwagunt Formation of the Chuar Group in Grand Canyon, Arizona. This sedimentary rock is 850 million years old. After performing an extraction of the rocks with organic solvents, Summons characterized the abundance of various lipid biomarkers using GC-MS/MS, as described above. Using the 412-->191 m/z transition, they identified gammacerane in the extract. Summons interpreted this signal as the diagenetic product of tetrahymanol. At the time, this lipid had only been observed in protozoa, mainly ciliates. They interpreted it as a biomarker for the existence of protozoa in the Neoproterozoic. This report is still the oldest observation of gammacerane in the rock record.
