= Gammacerane =

Names
- IUPAC name Gammacerane
- Systematic IUPAC name (4aS,6aR,6bR,8aS,12aS,12bR,14aR,14bS)-4,4,6a,6b,9,9,12a,14b-Octamethyldocosahydropicene

Identifiers
CAS Number	559-65-9
3D model (JSmol)	Interactive image
Beilstein Reference	2562711
ChEBI	CHEBI:36473
ChemSpider	7827643
PubChem CID	9548720
CompTox Dashboard (EPA)	DTXSID601337270
- InChI: InChI=1S/C30H52/c1-25(2)15-9-17-27(5)21(25)13-19-29(7)23(27)11-12-24-28(6)18-10-16-26(3,4)22(28)14-20-30(24,29)8/h21-24H,9-20H2,1-8H3/t21-,22-,23+,24+,27-,28-,29+,30+/m0/s1 Key: QDUDLLAGYKHBNK-QPYQYMOUSA-N; InChI=1S/C30H52/c1-25(2)15-9-17-27(5)21(25)13-19-29(7)23(27)11-12-24-28(6)18-10-16-26(3,4)22(28)14-20-30(24,29)8/h21-24H,9-20H2,1-8H3/t21-,22-,23+,24+,27-,28-,29+,30+/m0/s1 Key: QDUDLLAGYKHBNK-QPYQYMOUSA-N
- SMILES: [H][C@@]12CC[C@]3(C)[C@]([H])(CC[C@]4([H])[C@@]5(C)CCCC(C)(C)[C@]5([H])CC[C@@]34C)[C@@]1(C)CCCC2(C)C

Properties
Chemical formula	C_{30}H_{52}
Molar mass	412.746 g·mol^{−1}
- Except where otherwise noted, data are given for materials in their standard state (at 25 °C [77 °F], 100 kPa). Infobox references

Gammacerane is a pentacyclic triterpene compound with the formula C_{30}H_{52} and five six-membered rings. Its derivatives include tetrahymanol（gammaceran-3β-ol）and so on. After millions of years of diagenesis, these derivatives became gammacerane can be used as biomarkers in petroleum to study the origin of petroleum.

== See also ==
- Hopane
- Lupane
- Moretane
