= Squalene—-hopanol cyclase =

Squalene—hopanol cyclase

Identifiers
- EC no.: 4.2.1.129

Databases
- IntEnz: IntEnz view
- BRENDA: BRENDA entry
- ExPASy: NiceZyme view
- KEGG: KEGG entry
- MetaCyc: metabolic pathway
- PRIAM: profile
- PDB structures: RCSB PDB PDBe PDBsum
Search
- PMC: articles
- PubMed: articles
- NCBI: proteins

Squalene—hopanol cyclase (EC 4.2.1.129, squalene—hopene cyclase) is an enzyme with systematic name hopan-22-ol hydro-lyase. This enzyme catalyses the following chemical reaction

hopan-22-ol $\rightleftharpoons$ squalene + H_{2}O

The enzyme produces the cyclization products hopene and hopanol.
