= Lupane =

Lupane may refer to:

- Lupane District, Zimbabwe
  - Lupane State University
- Lupane (compound) (a type of triterpene compounds)
