= C30H50 =

The molecular formula C_{30}H_{50} (molar mass: 410.72 g/mol, exact mass: 410.3913 u) may refer to:

- Squalene
- Hopene
  - diploptene (Hop-22(29)-ene)
