= BPW =

BPW may refer to:

- Business and Professional Women's Foundation
- Lupeol synthase, an enzyme
- Bristol Parkway railway station in England (station code)
