= Cycloartenol synthase =

cycloartenol synthase

Identifiers
- EC no.: 5.4.99.8
- CAS no.: 9075-25-6

Databases
- IntEnz: IntEnz view
- BRENDA: BRENDA entry
- ExPASy: NiceZyme view
- KEGG: KEGG entry
- MetaCyc: metabolic pathway
- PRIAM: profile
- PDB structures: RCSB PDB PDBe PDBsum
- Gene Ontology: AmiGO / QuickGO
Search
- PMC: articles
- PubMed: articles
- NCBI: proteins

In enzymology, a cycloartenol synthase (EC 5.4.99.8) is an enzyme that catalyzes the chemical reaction

(S)-2,3-epoxysqualene $\rightleftharpoons$ cycloartenol

Hence, this enzyme has one substrate, (S)-2,3-epoxysqualene, and one product, cycloartenol.

This enzyme is an oxidosqualene cyclase and belongs to the family of isomerases, specifically those intramolecular transferases transferring other groups. This enzyme participates in biosynthesis of steroids.

== Nomenclature ==
The systematic name of this enzyme class is:

- (S)-2,3-epoxysqualene mutase (cyclizing, cycloartenol-forming).

Other names in common use include:

- 2,3-epoxysqualene cycloartenol-cyclase
- squalene-2,3-epoxide-cycloartenol cyclase
- 2,3-epoxysqualene cycloartenol-cyclase
- 2,3-epoxysqualene-cycloartenol cyclase
- 2,3-oxidosqualene-cycloartenol cyclase
