= Bacteriohopanepolyol =

Bacteriohopanetetrol (BHT), a prototypical bacteriohopanepolyol

Bacteriohopanepolyols (BHPs), bacteriohopanoids, or bacterial pentacyclic triterpenoids are commonly found in the lipid cell membranes of bacteria. BHPs are frequently used as biomarkers in sedimentary rocks and can provide paleoecological information about ancient bacterial communities.

== Function ==
Several studies have suggested that bacteriohopanepolyols play a role in the structure of membranes due to their polycylic structures and amphiphilic properties. BHPs have been hypothesized to be an evolutionary precursor to sterols, a class of biochemical compounds which is primarily present in eukaryotic cell membranes. The presence of BHPs in membranes has been found to improve the temperature, antimicrobial resistance, and pH tolerance of bacteria.

Additionally, BHPs have been found to be an important constituent of 'lipid rafts', which are enriched in specific lipids and provide transport, protein synthesis, and signal transduction proteins. Prior to their discovery in bacteria, lipid rafts were considered a key piece of the evolution of more complex, eukaryotic cells.

== Sources ==
Bacteriohopanepolyols have been found to be present in all types of sediment since their discovery in 1979, and are produced by a wide range of bacteria including alpha-, beta-, cyano-, and gammaproteobacteria While early studies estimated that around half of all species of bacteria produce hopanoids, more recent studies estimate around 4% of bacteria have the ability to produce hopanoids.

Several studies have used culture-independent methods to survey bacterial genomes for genes which may imply the ability to produce BHPs The squalene-hopene cyclase gene (sqhC) produces an enzyme that catalyzes the cyclization of squalene, a precursor of BHPs. Among thirty sequenced bacteria, this gene was found in the genomes of all hopanoid-containing bacteria, and very few of the bacteria which do not produce hopanoids, and therefore the presence of the sqhC gene was assumed to mean that the gene was expressed. Overall, fewer than ten-percent of the marine and freshwater bacterioplankton were found to possess this gene.

== Analysis ==
Bacteriohopanepolyols are commonly identified through chemical extraction of organic matter followed by analysis on a mass spectrometer. Extraction protocols are intended to purify natural samples to allow for analysis of a simpler mixture of compounds. Differences in the efficiency of extraction methods have been found to vary for different types of BHPs.

BHPs were first analyzed using a gas chromatograph mass spectrometer (GC-MS), however the use of HPLC-MS methods have become more common in recent years due to the ability to analyze BHPs without the Rohmer preparation procedure which resulted in a loss of specificity. Despite its advantages, analysis of BHPs using HPLC-MS is complicated by a lack of sufficient standards and variations in the efficiency of acetylation among different BHPs.

== Biomarker utility ==
The polycyclic hydrocarbon skeleton of BHPs makes them resistant to degradation, and allows for them to be preserved for long periods of time in the geologic record. However, the use of BHPs as a biomarker for a specific group of bacteria is limited by the current state of knowledge regarding the identification of groups of bacteria which produce specific bacteriohopanepolyols. Some BHPs may be produced by a diverse range of organisms, such as bacteriohopane-32,33,34,35-tetrol (BHT), and the biological source of many BHPs is uncertain, complicating interpretation of BHPs.

Initially, BHPs were thought to only be present in aerobic bacteria, however they have since been found in anaerobic bacteria. BHPs have often been used as an indicator for cyanobacteria, and forty-nine out of fifty-eight cultured cyanobacteria have been found to produce BHP. In particular, 2β-methylbiohopanoids has only been found to be produced in significant quantities by cyanobacteria.

An isomer of bacteriohopanetetrol was found to be associated with anoxic and suboxic conditions in marine pelagic sediments. Bacteriohopanepolyol identification has been paired with stable carbon isotope analysis, for greater specificity. In particular, the detection of 3-methylhopanoids (hopanoids with a methyl group at the C3 position) which are highly depleted in ^{13}C are interpreted as a proxy for methanotrophy.

== See also ==
- Hopane
