= Paula V. Welander =

Geomicrobiologist

Paula Welander
- Education: University of Illinois at Urbana-Champaign
- Children: 2
- Scientific career
- Thesis: Analysis of Methylotrophic Methanogenesis in Methanosarcina Barkeri Fusaro (2007)

Paula Veronica Welander is a microbiologist and professor at Stanford University who is known for her research using lipid biomarkers to investigate how life evolved on Earth.

== Early life and career ==
Welander was born and raised in the San Fernando Valley, California. Her mother and father immigrated from Mexico to Los Angeles in the early 1970's. She received her undergraduate degree from Occidental College in Los Angeles in 1998. She has a master's degree (2003) and a Ph.D. (2007) from the University of Illinois at Urbana-Champaign. She went on to do postdoctoral studies at Massachusetts Institute of Technology in the Departments of Biology and of Earth, Atmospheric, and Planetary Sciences. Welander began her position at Stanford University in 2013, and was awarded tenure in 2019.

== Research ==
Welander's graduate research examined factors controlling the use of methane by a group of Archaea. For her postdoctoral research, she examined the production of a group of chemical compounds known as hopanoids. Welander has examined lipids in acid-loving archaea and how changes in the lipids alter a cell's ability to grow. Her research has further expanded our understanding of the organisms that produce triterpenoid lipids in aquatic environments. Her more recent research centers on lipids, known as glycerol dibiphytanyl glycerol tetraethers (GDGTs), that are found in archaeal cell walls. Collectively, her research on lipids can be used to characterize how microbial life on Earth has changed over time.

== Honors and awards ==
In 2018, Welander received the Geobiology and Geomicrobiology Division Award for Outstanding Research from the Geological Society of America. She also received a CAREER award from the National Science Foundation.

== Selected publications ==
- Sessions, Alex L.; Doughty, David M.; Welander, Paula V.; Summons, Roger E.; Newman, Dianne K. (2009-07-28). "The Continuing Puzzle of the Great Oxidation Event". Current Biology. 19 (14): R567–R574. Bibcode:2009CBio...19.R567S. doi:10.1016/j.cub.2009.05.054. hdl:1721.1/96187. ISSN 0960-9822. PMID 19640495. S2CID 7346329.
- Welander, Paula V.; Hunter, Ryan C.; Zhang, Lichun; Sessions, Alex L.; Summons, Roger E.; Newman, Dianne K. (2009). "Hopanoids Play a Role in Membrane Integrity and pH Homeostasis in Rhodopseudomonas palustris TIE-1". Journal of Bacteriology. 191 (19): 6145–6156. doi:10.1128/JB.00460-09. ISSN 0021-9193. PMC 2747905. PMID 19592593.
- Welander, Paula V.; Coleman, Maureen L.; Sessions, Alex L.; Summons, Roger E.; Newman, Dianne K. (2010-05-11). "Identification of a methylase required for 2-methylhopanoid production and implications for the interpretation of sedimentary hopanes". Proceedings of the National Academy of Sciences. 107 (19): 8537–8542. Bibcode:2010PNAS..107.8537W. doi:10.1073/pnas.0912949107. ISSN 0027-8424. PMC 2889317. PMID 20421508.
- Wei, Jeremy H.; Yin, Xinchi; Welander, Paula V. (2016). "Sterol Synthesis in Diverse Bacteria". Frontiers in Microbiology. 7: 990. doi:10.3389/fmicb.2016.00990. ISSN 1664-302X. PMC 4919349. PMID 27446030.
- Welander, Paula V.; Summons, Roger E. (2012-08-07). "Discovery, taxonomic distribution, and phenotypic characterization of a gene required for 3-methylhopanoid production". Proceedings of the National Academy of Sciences. 109 (32): 12905–12910. Bibcode:2012PNAS..10912905W. doi:10.1073/pnas.1208255109. ISSN 0027-8424. PMC 3420191. PMID 22826256.
