= Tetrahymanol synthase =

Identifiers
- EC no.: 4.2.1.123

Databases
- IntEnz: IntEnz view
- BRENDA: BRENDA entry
- ExPASy: NiceZyme view
- KEGG: KEGG entry
- MetaCyc: metabolic pathway
- PRIAM: profile
- PDB structures: RCSB PDB PDBe PDBsum
Search
- PMC: articles
- PubMed: articles
- NCBI: proteins

Tetrahymanol synthase (EC 4.2.1.123, squalene tetrahymanol cyclase) is an enzyme with systematic name squalene hydro-lyase (tetrahymanol forming). This enzyme catalyses the following chemical reaction

tetrahymanol $\rightleftharpoons$ squalene + H_{2}O

The reaction occurs in the reverse direction.

This enzyme is isolated from Tetrahymena protozoans.
