= Lupane (compound) =

Organic compound (C30H50); pentacyclic triterpene hydrocarbon

Names
- IUPAC name (1S,3aR,5aR,5bR,7aS,11aS,11bR,13aR,13bR)-3a,5a,5b,8,8,11a-Hexamethyl-1-propan-2-yl-1,2,3,4,5,6,7,7a,9,10,11,11b,12,13,13a,13b-hexadecahydrocyclopenta[a]chrysene

Identifiers
CAS Number	464-99-3
3D model (JSmol)	Interactive image
Beilstein Reference	2562721
ChEBI	CHEBI:36485
ChemSpider	2340755
PubChem CID	9548715
CompTox Dashboard (EPA)	DTXSID40963569
- InChI: InChI=1S/C30H52/c1-20(2)21-12-16-27(5)18-19-29(7)22(25(21)27)10-11-24-28(6)15-9-14-26(3,4)23(28)13-17-30(24,29)8/h20-25H,9-19H2,1-8H3/t21-,22+,23-,24+,25+,27+,28-,29+,30+/m0/s1 Key: NKMDIWKRKQFYPH-VIUFNMEASA-N
- SMILES: CC(C)[C@@H]1CC[C@]2([C@H]1[C@H]3CC[C@@H]4[C@]5(CCCC([C@@H]5CC[C@]4([C@@]3(CC2)C)C)(C)C)C)C

Properties
Chemical formula	C_{30}H_{52}
Molar mass	412.746 g·mol^{−1}
- Except where otherwise noted, data are given for materials in their standard state (at 25 °C [77 °F], 100 kPa). Infobox references

Lupane is a pentacyclic triterpene hydrocarbon, having the molecular formula C_{30}H_{52}, which serves as the core skeleton in several bioactive compounds. Such compounds include lupeol and betulinic acid which are found in some plant species. It actually features a structure composed of five fused rings––four cyclohexane rings and one cyclopentane––and is one of the major triterpene skeletons alongside hopane, oleanane, and ursane types. The compound is common in birch bark.

== Occurrence and derivatives ==
Derivatives of lupane, such as lupeol, betulin, and betulinic acid, are found in high concentrations in birch bark (Betula spp.), mango peels, olives, strawberries, and other fruits.

=== Similar derivatives ===
Similar derivatives are the following ones:

- Lupeol (C_{30}H_{50}O) – a hydroxylated lupane at position C‑3, with noted anti-inflammatory and anti‑cancer effects.
- Betulin (C_{30}H_{50}O_{2}) – a diol lupane naturally abundant in birch bark (up to 30% by dry weight) and researched for wound healing and pharmaceutical uses.
- Betulinic acid – the oxidized carboxylic acid form of betulin; one of the most extensively studied lupane-derived compounds with anticancer activity.
