= Gorgostane =

Chemical compound

Names
- IUPAC name 5ξ-Gorgostane
- Systematic IUPAC name (3aS,3bR,5Ξ,9aS,9bS,11aR)-9a,11a-Dimethyl-1-[(1S)-1-{(1R,2R)-2-methyl-2-[(2R)-3-methylbutan-2-yl]cyclopropyl}ethyl]hexadecahydro-1H-cyclopenta[a]phenanthrene

Identifiers
CAS Number	36564-41-7
3D model (JSmol)	Interactive image
ChEBI	CHEBI:24424
ChemSpider	5256778
KEGG	C19668
PubChem CID	6857440
CompTox Dashboard (EPA)	DTXSID301337033
- InChI: InChI=1S/C30H52/c1-19(2)21(4)30(7)18-27(30)20(3)24-13-14-25-23-12-11-22-10-8-9-16-28(22,5)26(23)15-17-29(24,25)6/h19-27H,8-18H2,1-7H3/t20-,21+,22?,23-,24+,25-,26-,27+,28-,29+,30+/m0/s1 Key: HMDSENZCYXUARJ-YTJYYLLXSA-N
- SMILES: C[C@@H]([C@H]1CC[C@@H]2[C@@]1(CC[C@H]3[C@H]2CCC4[C@@]3(CCCC4)C)C)[C@H]5C[C@]5(C)[C@H](C)C(C)C

Properties
Chemical formula	C_{30}H_{52}
Molar mass	412.746 g·mol^{−1}
- Except where otherwise noted, data are given for materials in their standard state (at 25 °C [77 °F], 100 kPa). Infobox references

Gorgostane is a steroid triterpene, its derivative distributed in corals, hence the name. Compared with other steroids, there is a cyclopropane ring in the 17C side-chain.
