= Lupeol =

Names
- IUPAC name (1R,3aR,5aR,5bR,7aR,9S,11aR,11bR,13aR,13bR)-3a,5a,5b,8,8,11a-hexamethyl-1-prop-1-en-2-yl-1,2,3,4,5,6,7,7a,9,10,11,11b,12,13,13a,13b-hexadecahydrocyclopenta[a]chrysen-9-ol
- Other names (3β,13ξ)-Lup-20(29)-en-3-ol; Clerodol; Monogynol B; Fagarasterol; Farganasterol

Identifiers
CAS Number	545-47-1
3D model (JSmol)	Interactive image
ChEMBL	ChEMBL289191
ChemSpider	23089061
ECHA InfoCard	100.008.082
PubChem CID	259846
UNII	O268W13H3O
- InChI: InChI=1S/C30H50O/c1-19(2)20-11-14-27(5)17-18-29(7)21(25(20)27)9-10-23-28(6)15-13-24(31)26(3,4)22(28)12-16-30(23,29)8/h20-25,31H,1,9-18H2,2-8H3/t20-,21?,22-,23+,24-,25+,27+,28-,29+,30+/m0/s1
- SMILES: CC([C@@H]1CC[C@@]2(C)[C@@]1([H])[C@@]3([H])CC[C@]4([H])[C@@]5(C)CC[C@H](O)C(C)(C)[C@]5([H])CC[C@@]4(C)[C@]3(C)CC2)=C

Properties
Chemical formula	C_{30}H_{50}O
Molar mass	426.729 g·mol^{−1}
- Except where otherwise noted, data are given for materials in their standard state (at 25 °C [77 °F], 100 kPa). Infobox references

Lupeol is a pharmacologically active pentacyclic triterpenoid. It has several potential medicinal properties, like anticancer and anti-inflammatory activity.

== Natural occurrences ==
Lupeol is found in a variety of plants, including mango, Acacia visco and Abronia villosa. It is also found in dandelion coffee. Lupeol is present as a major component in Camellia japonica leaf.

== Total synthesis ==
The first total synthesis of lupeol was reported by Gilbert Stork et al.

In 2009, Surendra and Corey reported a more efficient and enantioselective total synthesis of lupeol, starting from (1E,5E)-8-[(2S)-3,3-dimethyloxiran-2-yl]-2,6-dimethylocta-1,5-dienyl acetate by use of a polycyclization.

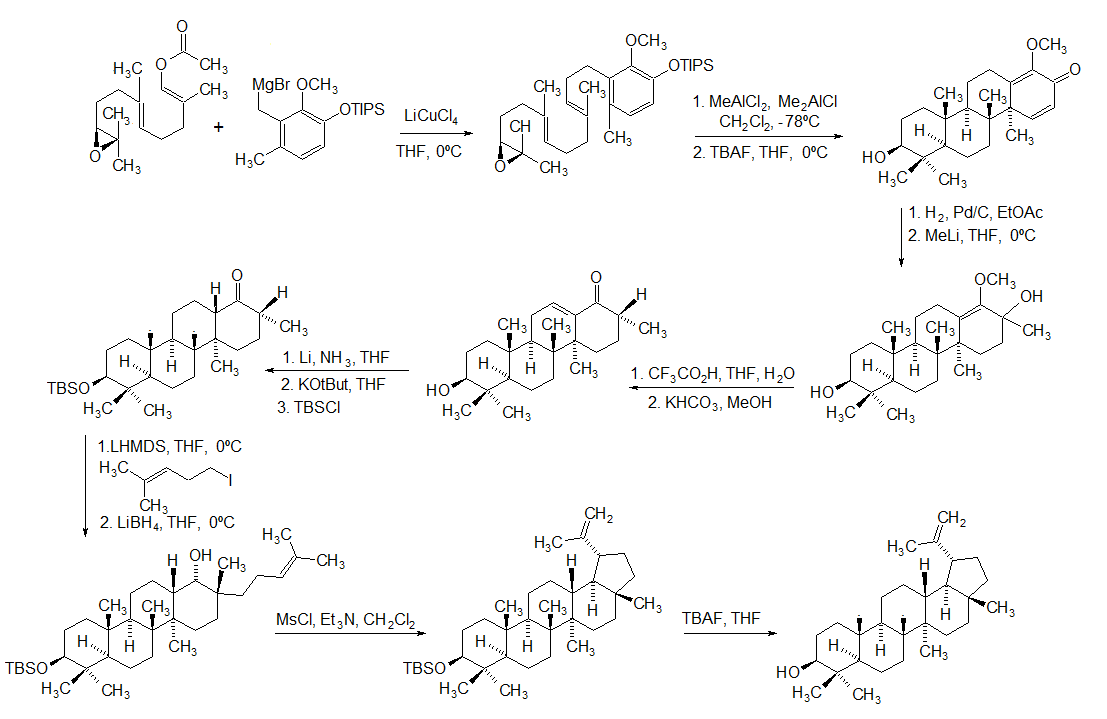

== Biosynthesis ==
Lupeol is produced by several organisms from squalene epoxide. Dammarane and baccharane skeletons are formed as intermediates. The reactions are catalyzed by the enzyme lupeol synthase. A recent study on the metabolomics of Camellia japonica leaf revealed that lupeol is produced from squalene epoxide where squalene play the role as a precursor.

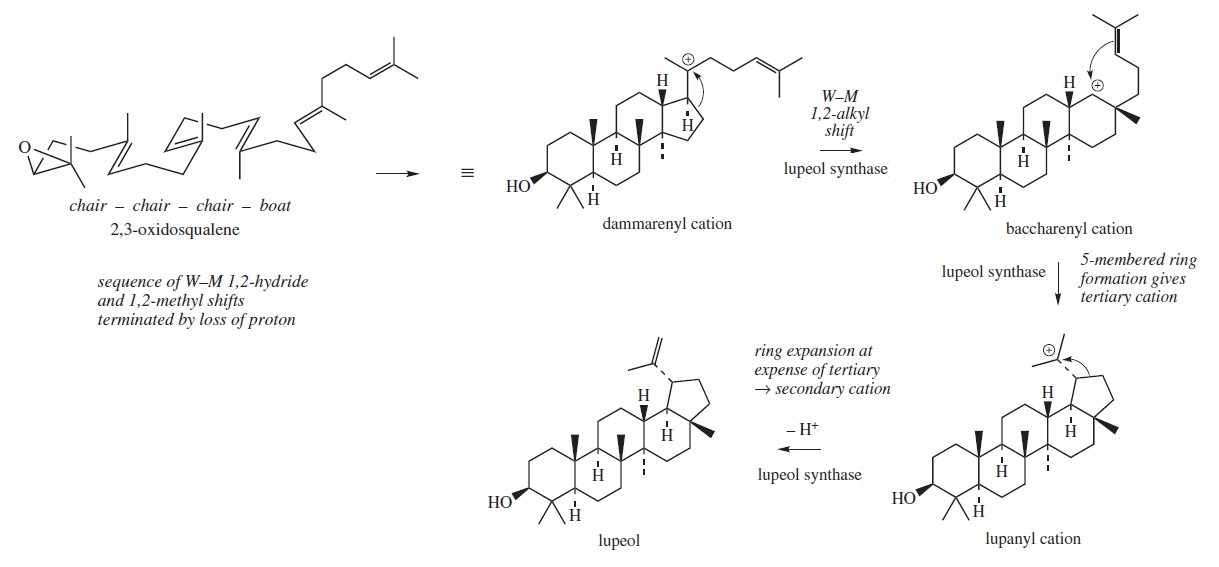

== Pharmacology ==
Lupeol has a complex pharmacology, displaying antiprotozoal, antimicrobial, antiinflammatory, antitumor and chemopreventive properties.

Animal models suggest lupeol may act as an anti-inflammatory agent. A 1998 study found lupeol to decrease paw swelling in rats by 39%, compared to 35% for the standardized control compound indomethacin.

One study has also found some activity as a dipeptidyl peptidase-4 inhibitor and prolyl oligopeptidase inhibitor at high concentrations (in the millimolar range).

It is an effective inhibitor in laboratory models of prostate and skin cancers.

As an anti-inflammatory agent, lupeol functions primarily on the interleukin system. Lupeol to decreases interleukin 4 (IL-4) production by T-helper type 2 cells.

Lupeol has been found to have a contraceptive effect due to its inhibiting effect on the calcium channel of sperm (CatSper).

Lupeol has also been shown to exert anti-angiogenic and anti-cancer effects via the downregulation of TNF-alpha and VEGFR-2.

The leaves of Camellia japonica contain lupeol.

== See also ==
- Betulin
- Betulinic acid
