= Betulin =

- Betulin

Names
- IUPAC name Lup-20(29)-ene-3β,28-diol
- Systematic IUPAC name (1R,3aS,5aR,5bR,7aR,9S,11aR,11bR,13aR,13bR)-3a-(Hydroxymethyl)-5a,5b,8,8,11a-pentamethyl-1-(prop-1-en-2-yl)icosahydro-1H-cyclopenta[a]chrysen-9-ol
- Other names Betulinol, betuline, betulol, betulinic alcohol, trochol

Identifiers
CAS Number	473-98-3
3D model (JSmol)	Interactive image; Interactive image
ChEMBL	ChEMBL23236
ChemSpider	65272
ECHA InfoCard	100.006.797
EC Number	207-475-5
KEGG	C08618
PubChem CID	72326
UNII	6W70HN7X7O
CompTox Dashboard (EPA)	DTXSID101019934
- InChI: InChI=1S/C30H50O2/c1-19(2)20-10-15-30(18-31)17-16-28(6)21(25(20)30)8-9-23-27(5)13-12-24(32)26(3,4)22(27)11-14-29(23,28)7/h20-25,31-32H,1,8-18H2,2-7H3/t20-,21+,22-,23+,24-,25+,27-,28+,29+,30+/m0/s1 Key: FVWJYYTZTCVBKE-ROUWMTJPSA-N; InChI=1/C30H50O2/c1-19(2)20-10-15-30(18-31)17-16-28(6)21(25(20)30)8-9-23-27(5)13-12-24(32)26(3,4)22(27)11-14-29(23,28)7/h20-25,31-32H,1,8-18H2,2-7H3/t20-,21+,22-,23+,24-,25+,27-,28+,29+,30+/m0/s1 Key: FVWJYYTZTCVBKE-ROUWMTJPBQ
- SMILES: O[C@H]5CC[C@@]4([C@@H]3[C@@]([C@]2([C@@H]([C@@H]1[C@](CO)(CC[C@H]1C(=C)C)CC2)CC3)C)(C)CC[C@H]4C5(C)C)C; CC(=C)[C@@H]1CC[C@]2([C@H]1[C@H]3CC[C@@H]4[C@]5(CC[C@@H](C([C@@H]5CC[C@]4([C@@]3(CC2)C)C)(C)C)O)C)CO

Properties
Chemical formula	C_{30}H_{50}O_{2}
Molar mass	442.728 g·mol^{−1}
Appearance	solid with needle-like crystals
Melting point	256 to 257 °C (493 to 495 °F; 529 to 530 K)
Solubility in water	insoluble
Solubility	slightly soluble in ethanol and benzene; soluble in diethyl ether, ethyl acetate and ligroin
- Except where otherwise noted, data are given for materials in their standard state (at 25 °C [77 °F], 100 kPa). verify (what is ?) Infobox references

Betulin is an abundant, naturally occurring triterpene. It is commonly isolated from the bark of birch trees, hence its name, from betula. It forms up to 30% of the dry weight of silver birch bark. It is also found in birch sap. Inonotus obliquus contains betulin.

The compound in the bark gives the tree its white color which appears to protect the tree from mid-winter overheating by the sun. As a result, birches are some of the northernmost occurring deciduous trees.

== History ==
Betulin was discovered in 1788 by German-Russian chemist Johann Tobias Lowitz.

== Chemistry ==
Chemically, betulin is a triterpenoid of lupane structure. It has a pentacyclic ring structure, and hydroxyl groups in positions C3 and C28.

== See also ==
- Abietic acid
- Stanol ester
- Phytosterols
