= Arborane =

Names
- Systematic IUPAC name (3S,3aS,5aS,5bR,7aS,11aR,11bS,13aR,13bS)-3a,5a,8,8,11a,13a-hexamethyl-3-propan-2-yl-1,2,3,4,5,5b,6,7,7a,9,10,11,11b,12,13,13b-hexadecahydrocyclopenta[a]chrysene

Identifiers
CAS Number	56271-20-6
3D model (JSmol)	Interactive image
PubChem CID	12305171
CompTox Dashboard (EPA)	DTXSID001336836
- InChI: InChI=1S/C30H52/c1-20(2)21-10-13-25-28(21,6)18-19-29(7)23-11-12-24-26(3,4)15-9-16-27(24,5)22(23)14-17-30(25,29)8/h20-25H,9-19H2,1-8H3/t21-,22-,23+,24-,25-,27+,28-,29-,30+/m0/s1 Key: UFBGZWVLKQSSJS-DEJKXBRXSA-N
- SMILES: CC(C)[C@@H]1CC[C@H]2[C@]1(CC[C@@]3([C@@]2(CC[C@H]4[C@H]3CC[C@@H]5[C@@]4(CCCC5(C)C)C)C)C)C

Properties
Chemical formula	C_{30}H_{52}
Molar mass	412.746 g·mol^{−1}
- Except where otherwise noted, data are given for materials in their standard state (at 25 °C [77 °F], 100 kPa). Infobox references

Arborane is a class of pentacyclic triterpene consisting of organic compounds with four 6-membered rings and one 5-membered ring. Arboranes are thought to be derived from arborinols, a class of natural cyclic triterpenoids typically produced by flowering plants. Thus arboranes are used as a biomarker for angiosperms and cordaites. Arborane is a stereoisomer of a compound called fernane, the diagenetic product of fernene and fernenol. Because aborinol and fernenol have different biological sources, the ratio of arborane/fernane in a sample can be used to reconstruct a record for the relative abundances of different plants.

== Background ==
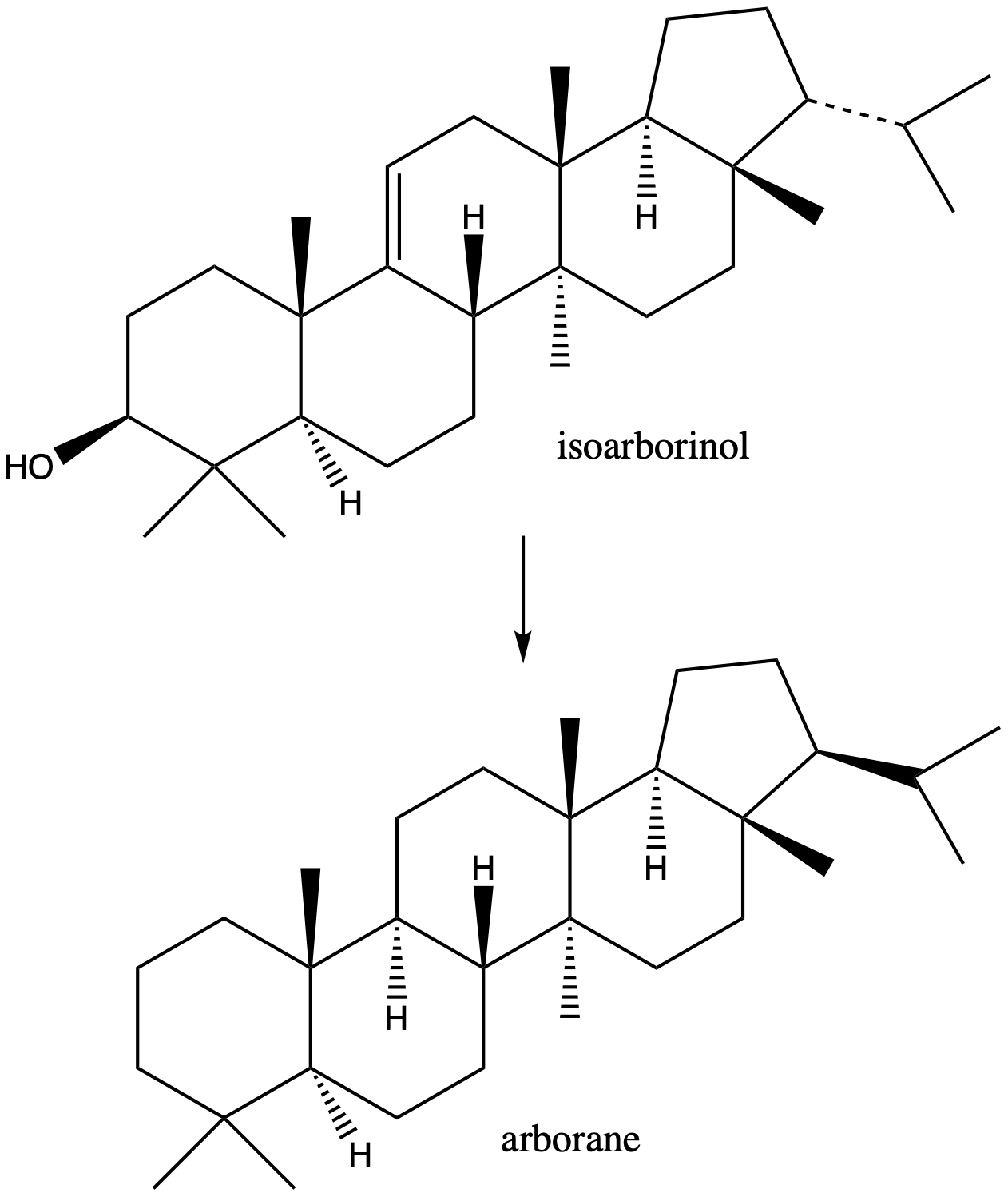
Diagenesis of isoarborinol

Arborane, the diagenetic product of arborinol and isoarborinol, is a pentacyclic triterpene. Isoarborinol was first isolated from the Messel oil shale in 1969 by Albrecht and Ourisson. The discovery of isoarborinol derivatives in sedimentary rocks that predate the first angiosperms, particularly Permian and Triassic sedimentary rocks, contradicted previous knowledge that plants were the only biological source for arborinols. This discovery suggested that a non-plant source for arborinols existed during this period. The explanation behind the appearance of a plant-derived compound in the Permian and Triassic rock record remained unknown for nearly twenty years. Understanding the biological synthesis pathways for arborinols requires a combination of molecular biology and lipid analysis of the diagenetic products in sediments.

== Biological production ==
Oxadosqualene cyclase (OSC) is an enzyme typically found in plants that is used to synthesize arborinol and isoarborinol. OSC allows for carbocation intermediates that are necessary in the cyclization of a 30-carbon acyclic isoprenoid which leads to the production of isoarborinol. OSC can produce both pentacyclic and tetracyclic organic compounds in plants, but was previously known to only produce tetracyclic compounds in bacteria. Eudoraea adriatica is the first bacterium known to synthesize arborinols. E. adriatica, which was extracted from surface waters in the Adriatic Sea, is the only known bacterium to produce these pentacyclic triterpenes. The evolutionary pathway for OSC in bacteria is still unknown; however, E. adriatic is distinct from the isoarborinol synthase used in plants. This phylogenetic difference suggests that arboranes have been produced through multiple pathways in the OSC family.

== Measurement ==
The structure of isoarborinol was first elucidated using x-ray crystallography. More recently, mass spectrometry and NMR spectroscopy are used to detect arborane and its derivatives. Arborane, along with other C-5 unsaturated compounds, has a base peak at m/z 274 and a strong peak at m/z 259. C-5 unsaturated compounds with an isopropyl group, which include both arborane and fernane, have an additional strong peak at m/z 231 that distinguish it from other C-5 unsaturated compounds. Arborane and fernane have nearly identical fragmentation patterns with slightly different abundances for certain peaks making them difficult to distinguish. One common method for differentiating the two stereoisomers is by using gas chromatography-isotopic ratio-mass spectrometry. Another common method is measuring the optical rotation values.

== Preservation ==
Arborinol is quite recalcitrant in sediment and has been detected in samples up to 50 million years old. When buried in sediment for time periods greater than 50 million years, both arborinol and isoarborinol can lose the hydroxyl functional group and convert to arborane under low temperatures via a process called diagenesis. Under harsher conditions such as high temperatures, high acidity, or highly oxidizing environments, arborane can further breakdown into a wide variety of products including MATH (5-methyl-10(4-methylpentyl) des-A-25-norarbora(ferna)-5,7,9-triene), MAPH (25-norarbora(ferna)-5,7,9-triene), DAPH 1 (24,25-dinorarbora (ferna)-1,3,5,7,9-pentaene) and DAPH 2 (iso-25-norarbora (ferna)-1,3,5,7,9-pentaene). Because arborinol is almost exclusively produced by flowering plants, arborane and its derivatives are used as a biomarker for angiosperms. These molecular fossils can provide information on the geographic distribution of plants in early Earth.

== Case Study: Saar-Nahe Basin ==
The hydrocarbon composition of thirty-seven samples of coal extracted from boreholes in the Saar-Nahe Basin in southwestern Germany were analyzed in a 1994 study. The samples are from the Upper Carboniferous (360 to 299 Mya) or Lower Permian (299 to 251 Mya) periods. Mass spectrometry and NMR were used to identify 5-methyl-10-(4-methylpentyl)-des-A-25-norarbora(ferna)-5,7,9-triene (MATH) and 25-norarbora(ferna)-5,7,9-triene as the two most abundant compounds. These two hydrocarbons are derivatives from isoarborinol and fernenes that are thought to form from a 4,5-cleavage following a methyl-shift in an arborane/fernane precursor under strongly acidic conditions. The results from this study suggest that the arborane/fernane precursors may have been produced by higher plants such as Pteridospermales and Coniferophytes.

== Case Study: European Carboniferous and Permian Coals ==
A 2012 study aimed to connect climate patterns to the organic matter compositions of various coal and lacustrine samples throughout Europe from the Carboniferous and Permian periods. Both arboranes and fernanes were found in samples from the Donets Basin (Kasimovian), the Saar Basin (Early Stephanian), the Puertollano Basin (Late Stephanian), the Autun Basin (Autunian) and the Buxieres Basin (Autunian). Neither were detected in the Visean samples from the Moscow Basin or the Moscovian samples from the Donets and Saar Basins. The arborane/fernane ratio is an indication of cordaites and possibly seed ferns; therefore, the maximum in this ratio is associated with the presence of cordaites and possibly gymnosperms. The abundances of other aromatic and aliphatic compounds from these samples along with arborane/fernane were used to propose a record for wet and dry cycles in Europe.
