= Hopane =

Names
- IUPAC name Hopane
- Systematic IUPAC name (3R,3aS,5aR,5bR,7aS,11aS,11bR,13aR,13bS)-5a,5b,8,8,11a,13b-Hexamethyl-3-(propan-2-yl)icosahydro-1H-cyclopenta[a]chrysene
- Other names A'-Neogammacerane

Identifiers
CAS Number	471-62-5
3D model (JSmol)	Interactive image
ChemSpider	9711
PubChem CID	10115
UNII	W2H93796GT
CompTox Dashboard (EPA)	DTXSID00904337
- InChI: InChI=1S/C30H52/c1-20(2)21-12-17-27(5)22(21)13-18-29(7)24(27)10-11-25-28(6)16-9-15-26(3,4)23(28)14-19-30(25,29)8/h20-25H,9-19H2,1-8H3/t21-,22+,23+,24-,25-,27+,28+,29-,30-/m1/s1 Key: ZRLNBWWGLOPJIC-PYQRSULMSA-N; InChI=1/C30H52/c1-20(2)21-12-17-27(5)22(21)13-18-29(7)24(27)10-11-25-28(6)16-9-15-26(3,4)23(28)14-19-30(25,29)8/h20-25H,9-19H2,1-8H3/t21-,22+,23+,24-,25-,27+,28+,29-,30-/m1/s1 Key: ZRLNBWWGLOPJIC-PYQRSULMBH
- SMILES: [C@@H]54[C@]([C@@H]3[C@@]([C@]1([C@@H]([C@]2(C)[C@@H](CC1)C(C)(C)CCC2)CC3)C)(C)CC4)(C)CC[C@@H]5C(C)C

Properties
Chemical formula	C_{30}H_{52}
Molar mass	412.746 g·mol^{−1}
Density	0.952 g/ml
- Except where otherwise noted, data are given for materials in their standard state (at 25 °C [77 °F], 100 kPa). Infobox references

Hopane is a natural chemical compound classified as a triterpene. It forms the central core of a variety of other chemical compounds which are collectively known as hopanoids. The first compound of the hopane family to be isolated and characterised was hydroxyhopanone, found in dammar resin. The name derives from Hopea, a tree genus from which dammar is obtained.

== See also ==
- Bacteriohopanepolyol
