= Squalene-hopene cyclase =

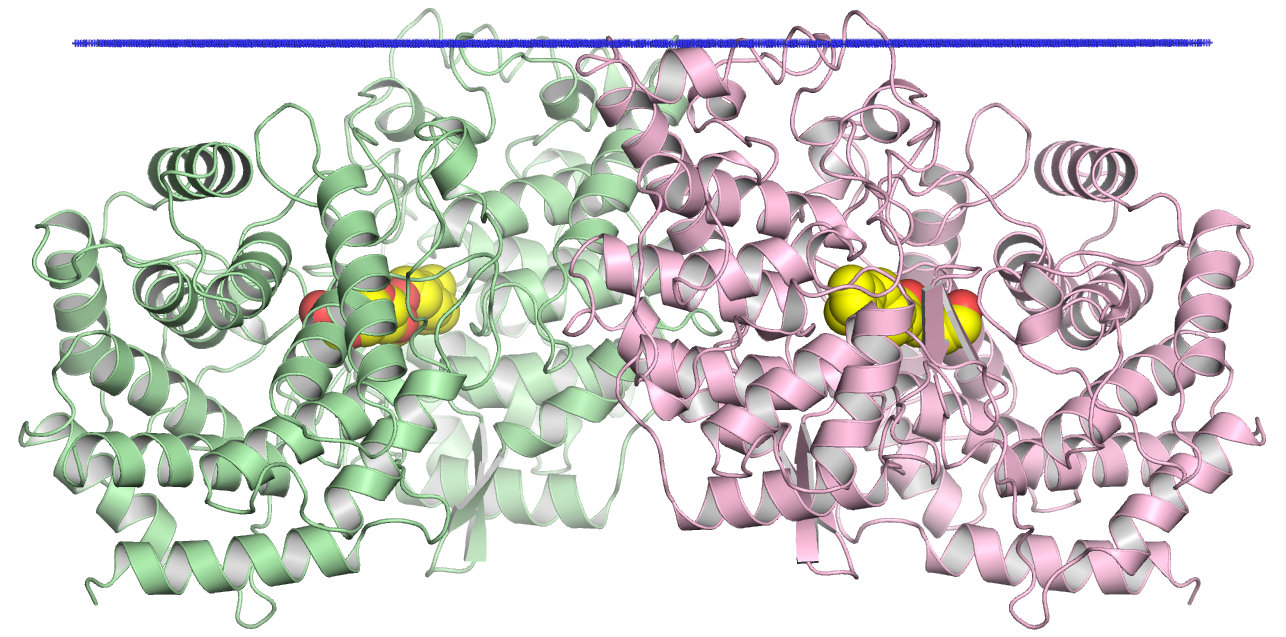
- The crystallographic structure of the squalene-hopene cyclase dimer, with the membrane position indicated in blue, the two monomers in green and pink, and a substrate mimetic in the central cavity in yellow.

Identifiers
- EC no.: 5.4.99.17
- CAS no.: 76600-69-6

Databases
- IntEnz: IntEnz view
- BRENDA: BRENDA entry
- ExPASy: NiceZyme view
- KEGG: KEGG entry
- MetaCyc: metabolic pathway
- PRIAM: profile
- PDB structures: RCSB PDB PDBe PDBsum
Search
- PMC: articles
- PubMed: articles
- NCBI: proteins

Squalene-hopene cyclase (SHC) (EC 5.4.99.17) or hopan-22-ol hydro-lyase is an enzyme in the terpene cyclase/mutase family. It catalyzes the interconversion of squalene into one of two pentacyclic triterpenes, diploptene and diplopterol. This enzyme catalyses the following chemical reactions.

squalene $\rightleftharpoons$ hop-22(29)-ene

squalene + H_{2}O $\rightleftharpoons$ hopan-22-ol

SHC is important because its products, hopanoids, are very much like sterols in eukaryotes in that they condense lipid membranes and reduce permeability. In fact, SHC and sterol-producing enzymes (oxidosqualene cyclase) are evolutionarily related to each other. Hopanoids are inferred to provide stability in the face of high temperatures and extreme acidity due to the rigid ring structure. Indeed, up-regulation of SHC occurs in certain bacteria in the presence of hot or acidic environments. SHC is found mostly in bacteria, but some eukaryotes, such as fungi and land plants, are also known to possess the enzyme.

Chemical structure of hopene

== Introduction ==
SHC is found in a large number of bacteria but is most readily isolated from the thermophilic bacterium Alicyclobacillus acidocaldarius.

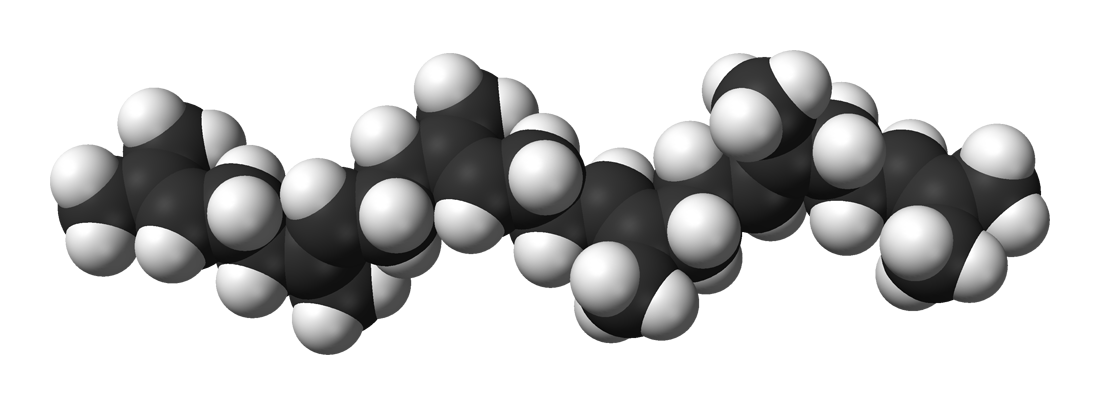
Space-filling model of the squalene molecule

SHC does not require molecular oxygen for its reaction and is thought to be an evolutionary progenitor of oxygen-dependent oxidosqualene cyclase (OSC), which produces tetracyclic sterols. OSC is a eukaryotic analog of SHC and requires molecular oxygen for its catalysis. This may suggest a later evolution of OSC relative to SHC, when the atmosphere began accumulating oxygen, although the distribution of SHC is also limited mostly to aerobic species.

== Structure ==
Squalene-hopene cyclase is a membrane-associated 70-75kDa protein composed of 631 amino acids and seven PTFB repeats. It exists as a monotopic homodimer.

== Mechanism ==
The formation of the hopene skeleton is one of the most complex single-step reactions in biochemistry. In a single step, 13 covalent bonds are broken or formed, 9 chiral centers are established, and 5 rings are produced. Squalene–hopene cyclase catalyses the conversion of the acyclic molecule of squalene into the pentacyclic triterpenes of hopene and hopanol. These products appear in the ratio 5:1. Hopene synthesis begins with binding squalene in an all pre-chair conformation and is followed by the formation of five C-C bonds. These sequential ring-forming reaction steps are initiated by an electrophilic attack of an acidic proton on one of the two terminal double bonds. The polycyclic formation is completed when a proton is eliminated from the alternative terminal methyl group of squalene via acceptance by a water molecule. This base is known as the front water. Other water molecules work to enhance polarization (back waters) and construct hydrogen bonds between seven residues—T41, E45, E93, R127, Q262, W133 and Y267. Front water also plays a role in determining the end product. If it stores the proton generated from either Methyl group 29 or 30 to form hopene. However, hopanol is produced in lesser quantities if instead of accepting the proton, water contributes a hydroxyl to the C-22 cation of the A-ring.

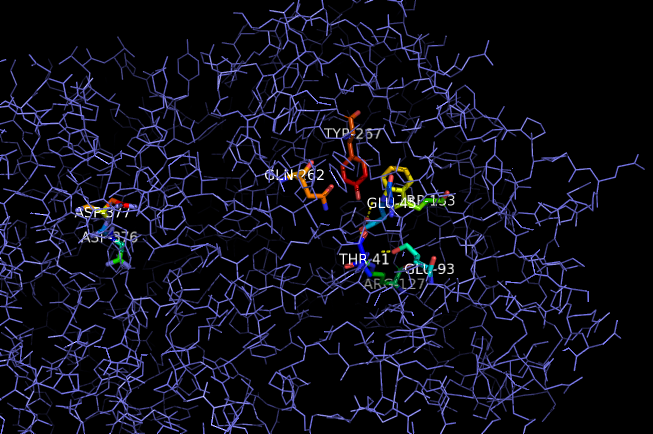
Suggested active residues in squalene-hopene cyclase

During the formation of rings A through D, there is very little conformational change. The reaction therefore requires no intermediate and can take place in one step. However, ring E formation is hindered by an entropic barrier, which may explain its absence in the tetracyclic steroids.

=== Active site ===
The SHC active site is located in a central cavity within the region of the protein adjacent to the membrane, and is accessed by the substrate via a non-polar channel. The active site is notably surrounded by aromatic residues forming a cavity that comfortably fits the squalene molecule when folded into a productive conformation. The catalytic mechanism uses coupled aspartate and histidine residues to initiate the cyclization reaction by protonating at C3 and deprotonating at C29, proceeding through a discrete series of carbocation intermediates. The enzyme can be inactivated by mutation of catalytic aspartates.

== Thermodynamics ==
This enzyme is unusually exothermic with an energy release of 40-50kcal/mol, well beyond the protein stabilization energy. This is thought to melt a lipid side channel through which the bulky product exits. In order to maintain its structural integrity, some scientists believe that the enzyme’s 7-8 non-tandem repeat QW motifs (Q is glutamine and W is tryptophan) that connect numerous surface α helices tighten the protein structure and prevent denaturing.

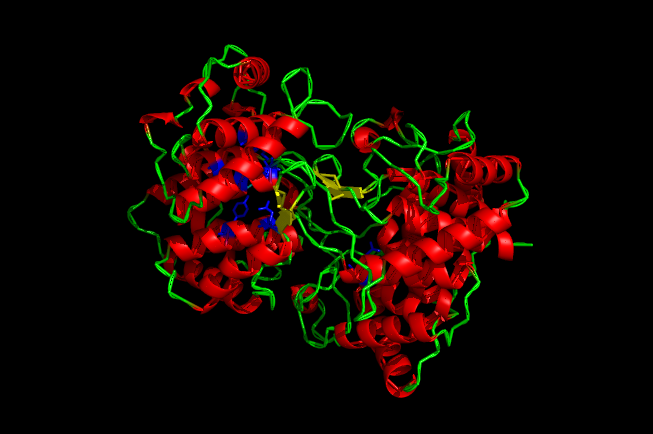
Numerous tightly linked surface helices
