= Hopanoids =

Class of chemical compounds

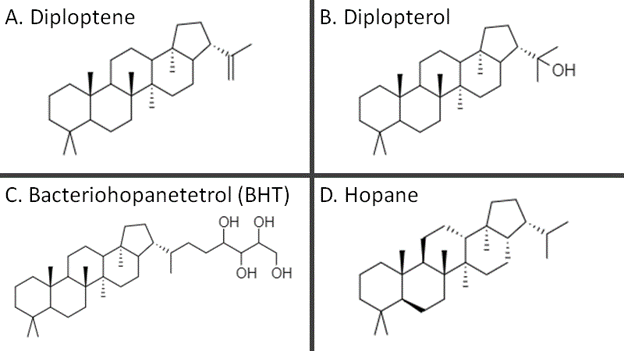
Some representative hopanoids: A. Diploptene, also called 22(29)-hopene B. Diplopterol, also called hopan-22-ol, the hydrated cyclomer of diploptene C. Bacteriohopanetetrol (BHT), a common extended hopanoid D. Hopane, the diagenetic product of A and B that results from reducing conditions during deposition and persists in the rock record. The diagenetic product of C would be an extended C_{35} hopane.

Hopanoids are a diverse subclass of triterpenoids with the same hydrocarbon skeleton as the compound hopane. This group of pentacyclic molecules therefore refers to simple hopenes, hopanols and hopanes, but also to extensively functionalized derivatives such as bacteriohopanepolyols (BHPs) and hopanoids covalently attached to lipid A.

The first known hopanoid, hydroxyhopanone, was isolated by two chemists at The National Gallery, London working on the chemistry of dammar gum, a natural resin used as a varnish for paintings. While hopanoids are often assumed to be made only in bacteria, their name actually comes from the abundance of hopanoid compounds in the resin of plants from the genus Hopea. In turn, this genus is named after John Hope, the first Regius Keeper of the Royal Botanic Garden, Edinburgh.

Since their initial discovery in an angiosperm, hopanoids have been found in plasma membranes of bacteria, lichens, bryophytes, ferns, tropical trees and fungi. Hopanoids have stable polycyclic structures that are well-preserved in petroleum reservoirs, rocks and sediment, allowing the diagenetic products of these molecules to be interpreted as biomarkers for the presence of specific microbes and potentially for chemical or physical conditions at the time of deposition. Hopanoids have not been detected in archaea.

== Biological function ==
About 10% of sequenced bacterial genomes have a putative shc gene encoding a squalene-hopene cyclase and can presumably make hopanoids, which have been shown to play diverse roles in the plasma membrane and may allow some organisms to adapt in extreme environments.

Since hopanoids modify plasma membrane properties in bacteria, they are frequently compared to sterols (e.g., cholesterol), which modulate membrane fluidity and serve other functions in eukaryotes. Although hopanoids do not rescue sterol deficiency, they are thought to increase membrane rigidity and decrease permeability. Also, gammaproteobacteria and eukaryotic organisms such as lichens and bryophytes have been shown to produce both sterols and hopanoids, suggesting these lipids may have other distinct functions. Notably, the way hopanoids pack into the plasma membrane can change depending on what functional groups are attached. The hopanoid bacteriohopanetetrol assumes a transverse orientation in lipid bilayers, but diploptene localizes between the inner and outer leaflet, presumably thickening the membrane to decrease permeability.

The hopanoid diplopterol orders membranes by interacting with lipid A, a common membrane lipid in bacteria, in ways similar to how cholesterol and sphingolipids interact in eukaryotic plasma membranes. Diplopterol and cholesterol were demonstrated to promote condensation and inhibit gel-phase formation in both sphingomyelin monolayers and monolayers of glycan-modified lipid A. Furthermore, both diplopterol and cholesterol could rescue pH-dependent phase transitions in glycan-modified lipid A monolayers. The role of hopanoids in membrane-mediated acid tolerance is further supported by observations of acid-inhibited growth and morphological abnormalities of the plasma membrane in hopanoid-deficient bacteria with mutant squalene-hopene cyclases.

Hopanoids are produced in several nitrogen-fixing bacteria. In the actinomycete Frankia, hopanoids in the membranes of vesicles specialized for nitrogen fixation likely restrict the entry of oxygen by making the lipid bilayer more tight and compact. In Bradyrhizobium, hopanoids chemically bonded to lipid A increase membrane stability and rigidity, enhancing stress tolerance and intracellular survival in Aeschynomene legumes. In the cyanobacterium Nostoc punctiforme, large quantities of 2-methylhopanoids localize to the outer membranes of survival structures called akinetes. In another example of stress tolerance, hopanoids in the aerial hyphae (spore bearing structures) of the prokaryotic soil bacteria Streptomyces are thought to minimize water loss across the membrane to the air.

== Biosynthesis ==
=== Squalene synthesis ===
Since hopanoids are a C_{30} terpenoid, biosynthesis begins with isopentenyl pyrophosphate (IPP) and dimethylallyl pyrophosphate (DMAP), which are combined to form longer chain isoprenoids. Synthesis of these smaller precursors proceeds either via the mevalonate pathway or the methylerythritol-4-phosphate pathway depending on the bacterial species, although the latter tends to be more common. DMAP condenses with one molecule of IPP to geranyl pyrophosphate, which in turn condenses with another IPP to generate farnesyl pyrophosphate (FPP). Squalene synthase, coded for by the gene sqs, then catalyzes the condensation of two FPP molecules to presqualene pyrophosphate (PSPP) before oxidizing NADPH to release squalene. However, some hopanoid-producing bacteria lack squalene synthase and instead use the three enzymes HpnC, HpnD and HpnE, which are encoded in the hpn operon with many other hopanoid biosynthesis genes. In this alternative yet seemingly more widespread squalene synthesis pathway, HpnD releases pyrophosphate as it condenses two molecules of FPP to PSPP, which HpnC converts to hydroxysqualene, consuming a water molecule and releasing another pyrophosphate. Then, hydroxysqualene is reduced to squalene in a dehydration reaction mediated by the FAD-dependent enzyme HpnE.

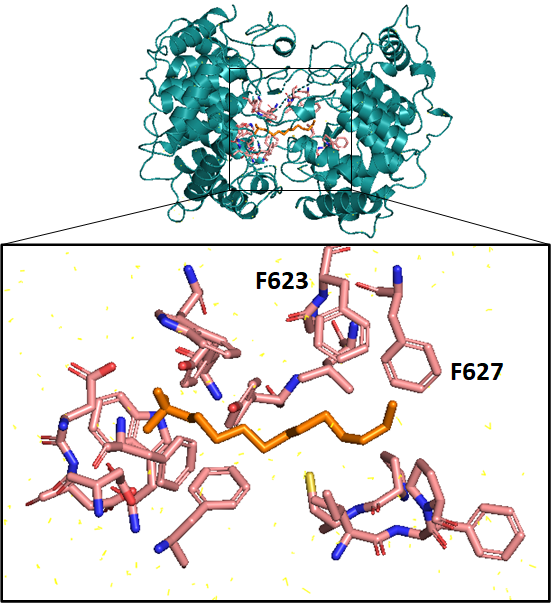
Active site of the squalene-hopene cyclase from Methylococcus capsulatus engaging the substrate, squalene, shown in gold. The cyclase is depicted as a monomer.

=== Cyclization ===
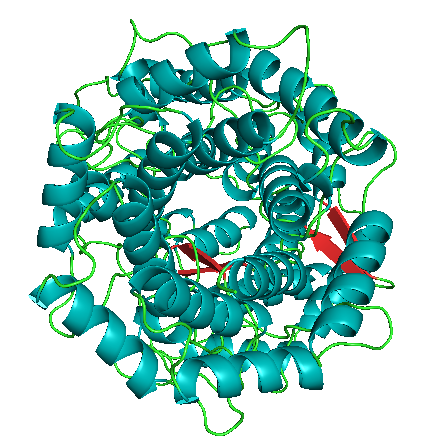
Alpha barrel structure of the squalene-hopene cyclase from Methylococcus capsulatus. Alpha helices are shown in blue, loop regions in green, and beta sheets in red.

Next, a squalene-hopene cyclase catalyzes an elaborate cyclization reaction, engaging squalene in an energetically favorable all-chair conformation before creating five cycles, six covalent bonds, and nine chiral centers on the molecule in a single step. This enzyme, coded for by the gene shc (also called hpnF in some bacteria), has a double ⍺-barrel fold characteristic of terpenoid biosynthesis and is present in the cell as a monotopic homodimer, meaning pairs of the cyclase are embedded in but do not span the plasma membrane. In vitro, this enzyme exhibits promiscuous substrate specificity, also cyclizing 2,3-oxidosqualene.

Aromatic residues in the active site form several unfavorable carbocations on the substrate which are quenched by a rapid polycyclization. In the last substep of the cyclization reaction, after electrons comprising the terminal alkene bond on the squalene have attacked the hopenyl carbocation to close the E ring, the C_{22} carbocation may be quenched by mechanisms that lead to different hopanoid products. Nucleophilic attack of water will yield diplopterol, while deprotonation at an adjacent carbon will form one of several hopene isomers, often diploptene.

=== Functionalization ===
After cyclization, hopanoids are frequently modified by hopanoid biosynthesis enzymes encoded by genes in the same operon as shc, hpn. For instance, the radical SAM protein HpnH adds an adenosine group to diploptene, forming the extended C_{35} hopanoid adenosylhopane, which can then be further functionalized by other hpn gene products. HpnG catalyzes the removal of adenine from adenosylhopane to make ribosyl hopane, which reacts to form bacteriohopanetetrol (BHT) in a reaction mediated by an unknown enzyme. Additional modifications may occurs as HpnO aminates the terminal hydroxyl on BHT, producing amino bacteriohopanetriol, or as the glycosyltransferase HpnI converts BHT to N-acetylglucosaminyl-BHT. In sequence, the hopanoid biosynthesis associated protein HpnK mediates deacetylation to glucosaminyl-BHT, from which radical SAM protein HpnJ generates a cyclitol ether.

Importantly, C_{30} and C_{35} hopanoids alike may be methylated at C_{2} and C_{3} positions by the radical SAM methyltransferases HpnP and HpnR, respectively. These two methylations are particularly geostable compared to side-chain modifications and have entertained geobiologists for decades.

In a biosynthetic pathway exclusive to some bacteria, the enzyme tetrahymanol synthase catalyzes the conversion of the hopanoid diploptene to the pentacyclic triterpenoid tetrahymanol. In eukaryotes like Tetrahymena, tetrahymanol is instead synthesized directly from squalene by a cyclase with no homology to the bacterial tetrahymanol synthase.

== In paleobiology ==
Hopanoids have been estimated to be the most abundant natural products on Earth, remaining in the organic fraction of all sediments, independent of age, origin or nature. The total amount in the Earth was estimated as 10 × 10^{18} gram (10^{12} ton) in 1992. Biomolecules like DNA and proteins are degraded during diagenesis, but polycyclic lipids persist in the environment over geologic timescales due to their fused, stable structures. Although hopanoids and sterols are reduced to hopanes and steranes during deposition, these diagenetic products can still be useful biomarkers, or molecular fossils, for studying the coevolution of early life and Earth.

Currently, the oldest detected undisputed triterpenoid fossils are Mesoproterozoic okenanes, steranes, and methylhopanes from a 1.64 Ga (billion year) old basin in Australia. However, molecular clock analyses estimate that the earliest sterols were likely produced around 2.3 Ga ago, around the same time as the Great Oxidation Event, with hopanoid synthesis arising even earlier.

For several reasons, hopanoids and squalene-hopene cyclases have been hypothesized to be more ancient than sterols and oxidosqualene cyclases. First, diplopterol is synthesized when water quenches the C_{22} carbocation formed during polycyclization. This indicates that hopanoids can be made without molecular oxygen and could have served as a sterol surrogate before the atmosphere accumulated oxygen, which reacts with squalene in a reaction catalyzed by squalene monooxygenase during sterol biosynthesis. Furthermore, squalene binds to squalene-hopene cyclases in a low-energy, all-chair conformation while oxidosqualene is cyclized in a more strained, chair-boat-chair-boat conformation. Squalene-hopene cyclases also display more substrate promiscuity in that they cyclize oxidosqualene in vitro, causing some scientists to hypothesize that they are evolutionary predecessors to oxidosqualene cyclases. Other scientists have proposed that squalene-hopene and oxidosqualene cyclases diverged from a common ancestor, a putative bacterial cyclase that would have made a tricyclic malabaricanoid or tetracyclic dammaranoid product.

=== 2-methylhopanoids ===
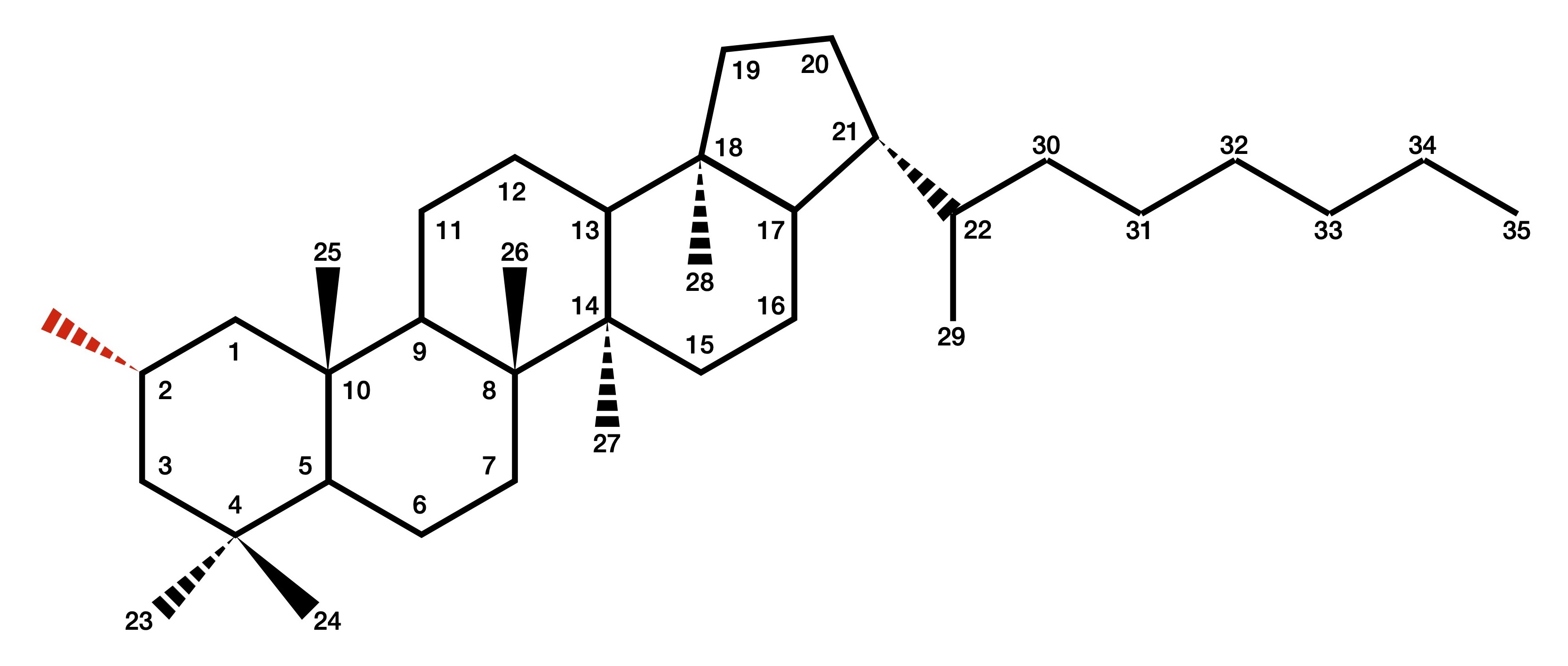
Structure of a 2-α-methylhopane with the carbons of the base hopane structure numbered according to convention. The methyl group at the C_{2} position is indicated in red.

==== As a biomarker for cyanobacteria ====
===== Proposal =====
2-methylhopanes, often quantified as the 2-α-methylhopane index, were first proposed as a biomarker for oxygenic photosynthesis by Roger Summons and colleagues following the discovery of the precursor lipids, 2-methylhopanols, in cyanobacterial cultures and mats. The subsequent discovery of 2-α-methylhopanes supposedly from photosynthetic cyanobacteria in 2.7 Ga old shales from the Pilbara Craton of Western Australia suggested a 400 Ma (million year) gap between the evolution of oxygenic metabolism and the Great Oxidation Event. However, these findings were later rejected due to potential contamination by modern hydrocarbons.

Putative cyanobacterial presence on the basis of abundant 2-methylhopanes has been used to explain black shale deposition during Aptian and Cenomanian–Turonian Ocean Anoxic Events (OAEs) and the associated ^{15}N isotopic signatures indicative of N_{2}-fixation. In contrast, 2-α-methylhopane index values are relatively low across similar Frasnian and Famennian sediments corresponding to the Kellwasser event(s), though higher levels have been reported in later Lower Famennian sections.

===== Dispute =====
The status of 2-methylhopanoids as a cyanobacterial biomarker was challenged by a number of microbiological discoveries. Geobacter sulfurreducens was demonstrated to synthesize diverse hopanols, although not 2-methyl-hopanols, when grown under strictly anaerobic conditions. Furthermore, the anoxygenic phototroph Rhodopseudomonas palustris was found to produce 2-methyl-BHPs only under anoxic conditions. This latter discovery also lead to the identification of the gene encoding the key methyltransferase HpnP. hpnP was subsequently identified in an acidobacterium and numerous alphaproteobacteria, and phylogenetic analysis of the gene concluded that it originated in the alphaproteobacteria and was acquired by the cyanobacteria and acidobacteriota via horizontal gene transfer.

Among cyanobacteria, hopanoid production is generally limited to terrestrial cyanobacteria. Among marine cyanobacteria, culture experiments in conducted by Helen Talbot and colleagues concluded that only two marine species–Trichodesmium and Crocosphaera–produced bacteriohopanepolyols. A later gene-based search for hpnP in available cyanobacterial genomes and Metagenome Assembled Genomes (MAGs) drew similar conclusions, identifying the gene in ~30% of terrestrial and freshwater species, and only one of the 739 marine cyanobacterial genomes and MAGs. Additionally, Nostoc punctiforme produces the greatest amount of 2-methylhopanoids when differentiated into akinetes. These cold- and desiccation-resistant cell structures are dormant and therefore not photosynthetically active, further challenging the association between 2-methylhopanes and oxygenic photosynthesis.

==== Other interpretations ====
Research demonstrating that the nitrite-oxidizing bacteria (NOB) Nitrobacter vulgaris increases its production of 2-methylhopanoids 33-fold when supplemented with cobalamin has furthered a non-cyanobacterial explanation for the observed abundance of 2-methylhopanes associated with Cretaceous OAEs. Felix Elling and colleagues propose that overturning circulation brought ammonia- and cobalt-rich deep waters to the surface, promoting aerobic nitrite oxidation and cobalamin synthesis, respectively. This model also addresses the conspicuous lack of 2-methylhopanes associated with Mediterranean sapropel events and in modern Black Sea sediments. Because both environments feature much less upwelling, 2-methylhopanoid-producing NOB such as N. vulgaris are outcompeted by NOB with higher nitrite affinity and anammox bacteria.

An environmental survey by Jessica Ricci and coauthors using metagenomes and clone libraries found significant correlation between plant-associated microbial communities and hpnP presence, based on which they propose that 2-methylhopanoids are a biomarker for sessile microbial communities high in osmolarity and low in oxygen and fixed nitrogen.

=== 3-methylhopanoids ===
3-methylhopanoids have historically been associated with aerobic methanotrophy based on culture experiments and co-occurrence with aerobic methanotrophs in the environment. As such, the presence of 3-methylhopanes, together with ^{13}C depletion, are considered markers of ancient aerobic methanotrophy. However, acetic acid bacteria have been known for decades to also produce 2-methylhopanoids. Additionally, following their identification of hpnR, the gene responsible for methylating hopanoids at the C_{3} position, Paula Welander and Roger Summons identified putative hpnR homologs in members of alpha-, beta-, and gammaproteobacteria, actinomycetota, nitrospirota, candidate phylum NC10, and an acidobacterium, as well as in three metagenomes. As such, Welander and Summons conclude that 3-methylhopanoids alone cannot constitute evidence of aerobic methanotrophy.

== Applications ==
=== Industry ===
The elegant mechanism behind the protonase activity of squalene-hopene cyclase was appreciated and adapted by chemical engineers at the University of Stuttgart, Germany. Active site engineering resulted in loss of the enzyme's ability to form hopanoids, but enabled Brønsted acid catalysis for the stereoselective cyclization of the monoterpenoids geraniol, epoxygeraniol, and citronellal.

=== Agriculture ===
The application of hopanoids and hopanoid-producing nitrogen fixers to soil has been proposed and patented as a biofertilizer technique that increases environmental resistance of plant-associated microbial symbionts, including nitrogen-fixing bacteria that are essential for transforming atmospheric nitrogen to soluble forms available to crops.

=== Medicine ===
During later studies of interactions between diplopterol and lipid A in Methylobacterium extorquens, multidrug transport was found to be a hopanoid-dependent process. Squalene-hopene cyclase mutants derived from a wild type capable of multidrug efflux, a drug-resistance mechanism mediated by integral transport proteins, lost the ability to perform both multidrug transport and hopanoid synthesis. Researchers indicate this could be due to direct regulation of transport proteins by hopanoids or indirectly by altering membrane ordering in a way that disrupts the transport system.
