= 2,3-Oxidosqualene =

Names
- Preferred IUPAC name 2,2-Dimethyl-3-[(3E,7E,11E,15E)-3,7,12,16,20-pentamethylhenicosa-3,7,11,15,19-pentaen-1-yl]oxirane
- Other names Squalene oxide 2,3-Squalene oxide Squalene epoxide Squalene-2,3-epoxide

Identifiers
CAS Number	7200-26-2
3D model (JSmol)	Interactive image; Interactive image
ChEBI	CHEBI:78662
ChemSpider	4517951
MeSH	2,3-oxidosqualene
PubChem CID	5366020
UNII	2Y5JJZ8E4W
CompTox Dashboard (EPA)	DTXSID50900960
- InChI: InChI=1S/C30H50O/c1-24(2)14-11-17-27(5)20-12-18-25(3)15-9-10-16-26(4)19-13-21-28(6)22-23-29-30(7,8)31-29/h14-16,20-21,29H,9-13,17-19,22-23H2,1-8H3/b25-15+,26-16+,27-20+,28-21+ Key: QYIMSPSDBYKPPY-BANQPHDMSA-N; InChI=1/C30H50O/c1-24(2)14-11-17-27(5)20-12-18-25(3)15-9-10-16-26(4)19-13-21-28(6)22-23-29-30(7,8)31-29/h14-16,20-21,29H,9-13,17-19,22-23H2,1-8H3/b25-15+,26-16+,27-20+,28-21+ Key: QYIMSPSDBYKPPY-BANQPHDMBU
- SMILES: O1C(C)(C)C1CC/C(=C/CC/C(=C/CC\C=C(/C)CC\C=C(/C)CC\C=C(/C)C)C)C; CC(=CCC/C(=C/CC/C(=C/CC/C=C(\C)/CC/C=C(\C)/CCC1C(O1)(C)C)/C)/C)C

Properties
Chemical formula	C_{30}H_{50}O
Molar mass	426.717 g/mol
- Except where otherwise noted, data are given for materials in their standard state (at 25 °C [77 °F], 100 kPa). verify (what is ?) Infobox references

(S)-2,3-Oxidosqualene ((S)-2,3-epoxysqualene) is an intermediate in the synthesis of the cell membrane sterol precursors lanosterol and cycloartenol, as well as saponins. It is formed when squalene is oxidized by the enzyme squalene monooxygenase. 2,3-Oxidosqualene is the substrate of various oxidosqualene cyclases, including lanosterol synthase, which produces lanosterol, a precursor to cholesterol.

The stereoisomer (R)-2,3-oxidosqualene is an inhibitor of lanosterol synthase.
