= (3S)-2,3-epoxy-2,3-dihydrosqualene mutase =

(3S)-2,3-epoxy-2,3-dihydrosqualene mutase may refer to:

- Thalianol synthase, an enzyme
- Protostadienol synthase, an enzyme
- Cucurbitadienol synthase, an enzyme
- α-amyrin synthase, an enzyme
- Lupeol synthase, an enzyme
- Shionone synthase, an enzyme
- Parkeol synthase, an enzyme
- Achilleol B synthase, an enzyme
- Glutinol synthase, an enzyme
- Friedelin synthase, an enzyme
- Baccharis oxide synthase, an enzyme
- α-seco-amyrin synthase, an enzyme
- Marneral synthase, an enzyme
- β-seco-amyrin synthase, an enzyme
- δ-amyrin synthase, an enzyme
- Tirucalladienol synthase, an enzyme
- Baruol synthase, an enzyme
