= CPQ =

CPQ may refer to:

== Groups and politics ==
- Conseil du patronat du Québec (English: Quebec Council of Employers), an institution that promotes business interests in Quebec, Canada
- Conservative Party of Quebec, a Canadian political party in the province of Quebec

== Science and technology ==
- Camphorquinone, main ingredient in dental resin fillings
- Carboxypeptidase Q, enzyme found in humans and encoded by CPQ gene
- Compaq, a defunct American technology company
- Configure, Price, and Quote, a category of software that helps companies offer and sell complex products
- Cucurbitadienol synthase, enzyme class found in plants
- 6-Chloro-2-(1-piperazinyl)quinoxaline, a serotonin reuptake inhibitor
