= PDSA =

PDSA may refer to:

- PDSA (plan–do–study–act), a quality improvement process
- People's Dispensary for Sick Animals, a UK veterinary charity
- Protostadienol synthase, an enzyme
