= Carboxypeptidase Q =

Enzyme found in humans

CPQ

Identifiers
- Aliases: CPQ, LDP, PGCP, carboxypeptidase Q
- External IDs: MGI: 1889205; GeneCards: CPQ

Gene location (Human)
Chr.	Chromosome 8 (human)
Band	8q22.1	Start	96,645,242 bp
Band	8q22.1	End	97,149,654 bp

Gene location (Mouse)
Chr.	Chromosome 15 (mouse)
Band	15|15 B3.1	Start	33,083,275 bp
Band	15|15 B3.1	End	33,594,698 bp
RNA expression pattern
Bgee	Human / Mouse (ortholog); Top expressed in: left lobe of thyroid gland; right lobe of thyroid gland; right coronary artery; saphenous vein; Descending thoracic aorta; popliteal artery; tibial arteries; gallbladder; left ovary; ascending aorta / Top expressed in: epithelium of lens; vestibular sensory epithelium; tunica media of zone of aorta; Epithelium of choroid plexus; iris; ciliary body; carotid body; right kidney; tunica adventitia of aorta; stria vascularis; More reference expression data
BioGPS	n/a
Gene ontology
Molecular function	carboxypeptidase activity; peptidase activity; metallodipeptidase activity; hydrolase activity; protein homodimerization activity; metallopeptidase activity; metal ion binding
Cellular component	cytoplasm; extracellular region; extracellular exosome; lysosome; endoplasmic reticulum; Golgi apparatus; extracellular space; intracellular membrane-bounded organelle
Biological process	proteolysis; peptide catabolic process; thyroid hormone generation; tissue regeneration
Sources:Amigo / QuickGO
Orthologs
Databases	NCBI: entry; OMA: entry
Species	Human	Mouse
Entrez	10404	54381
Ensembl	ENSG00000104324	ENSMUSG00000039007
UniProt	Q9Y646	Q9WVJ3
RefSeq (mRNA)	NM_016134	NM_018755; NM_176073
RefSeq (protein)	NP_057218	NP_061225; NP_788262
Location (UCSC)	Chr 8: 96.65 – 97.15 Mb	Chr 15: 33.08 – 33.59 Mb
PubMed search
- Wikidata
View/Edit Human	View/Edit Mouse

Carboxypeptidase Q is an enzyme that in humans is encoded by the CPQ gene. This is a carboxypeptidase enzyme which breaks down dipeptides (pairs of bound amino acids) into separate amino acids. It is mostly found in blood plasma, and may involved separating out the thyroid hormone, thyroxine (T_{4}), from its precursor, thyroglobulin.

== Function ==
This gene encodes a metallopeptidase that belongs to the peptidase M28 family. The encoded protein may catalyze the cleavage of dipeptides with unsubstituted terminals into amino acids. It has also been found as protein marker for migrasomes, a type of extracellular vesicle released by migrating cells, though its role in these vesicles, if any, remains unclear.

== Other names ==
This enzyme has previously also been called "plasma glutamate carboxypeptidase" (PGCP), "Ser-Met dipeptidase", and "lysosomal dipeptidase" (LDP).
