= Delta-amyrin synthase =

Class of enzymes

δ-Amyrin synthase

Identifiers
- EC no.: 5.4.99.55

Databases
- IntEnz: IntEnz view
- BRENDA: BRENDA entry
- ExPASy: NiceZyme view
- KEGG: KEGG entry
- MetaCyc: metabolic pathway
- PRIAM: profile
- PDB structures: RCSB PDB PDBe PDBsum
Search
- PMC: articles
- PubMed: articles
- NCBI: proteins

δ-Amyrin synthase (EC 5.4.99.55, SlTTS2 (gene)) is an enzyme with systematic name (3S)-2,3-epoxy-2,3-dihydrosqualene mutase (cyclizing, delta-amyrin-forming). This enzyme catalyses the following chemical reaction

(3S)-2,3-epoxy-2,3-dihydrosqualene $\rightleftharpoons$ delta-amyrin

The enzyme from tomato (Solanum lycopersicum) gives delta-amyrin, alpha-amyrin, beta-amyrin.
