= Marneral synthase =

Class of enzymes

Identifiers
- EC no.: 5.4.99.53

Databases
- IntEnz: IntEnz view
- BRENDA: BRENDA entry
- ExPASy: NiceZyme view
- KEGG: KEGG entry
- MetaCyc: metabolic pathway
- PRIAM: profile
- PDB structures: RCSB PDB PDBe PDBsum
Search
- PMC: articles
- PubMed: articles
- NCBI: proteins

Marneral synthase (EC 5.4.99.53) is an enzyme with systematic name (3S)-2,3-epoxy-2,3-dihydrosqualene mutase (cyclizing, marneral-forming). This enzyme catalyses the following chemical reaction

(3S)-2,3-epoxy-2,3-dihydrosqualene $\rightleftharpoons$ marneral

Marneral is a triterpenoid formed by Grob fragmentation of the A ring of 2,3-epoxy-2,3-dihydrosqualene during cyclization. This aldehyde gains its name from its structural similarity to a class triterpenes commonly found in members of the Iridaceae, originally identified by Dr. Franz-Josef Marner

This enzyme is a member of a metabolic gene cluster along with two other cytochrome P450s.
