= Migrasome =

Cellular organelle

Migrasomes are a type of cellular organelle produced during cell migration that mediate migracytosis, a cell migration-dependent mechanism for releasing cellular contents. They are typically 0.5–3 μm in diameter and form at the intersections or tips of retraction fibers.

== Discovery ==
Migrasomes are membrane-bound organelles associated with migrating cells. They were first discovered by Liang Ma, Li Yu, and their team in a study published in 2015. In this study, the researchers identified large vesicles growing on the retraction fibers left behind by migrating cells. These retraction fibers are thin extensions left behind when a cell moves across a surface. The large-vesicle structures contained several smaller vesicles within them, which were initially described as “pomegranate-like structures,” or PLSs, due to their appearance.

Several imaging methods were used to examine the structures and their relationship to migrating cells. Live-cell imaging and electron microscopy were used to show that these structures can retain and release cytosolic contents once the cell body moves away and the retraction fibers break. They named this release process “migracytosis.”

The formation of these vesicles was also determined to be migration-dependent, which is why the researchers named them “migrasomes.” Transmission electron microscopy (TEM) and scanning electron microscopy (SEM) were used to observe the pomegranate-like structures of these vesicles, and time-lapse imaging was used to help identify that the formation of PLSs is migration-dependent. They also discovered that the formation of migrasomes relies on the polymerization of actin. The discovery of this organelle helped establish a previously unrecognized mechanism, through which migrating cells can leave behind things like smaller vesicles and cytosolic proteins.

== Formation ==
Ma and Yu discovered the migrasome and determined that the formation of this organelle is linked to cell migration. As a cell moves, a trail of long protrusions from the cell surface called retraction fibers is left behind. It is at the junctions of these fibers where the formation of migrasomes occurs.

While the first study showed that migrasomes are produced during migration and require actin polymerization for their formation, a later study by Haisha Liang and colleagues examined the biogenesis of migrasomes. Lipid composition of the plasma membrane and lipid metabolism have a role in the initiation of migrasome formation. Research has shown that sphingomyelin synthase 2 (SMS2) is an essential protein for migrasome biogenesis because it forms stationary foci that move into retraction fibers when cells migrate and will eventually become migrasomes. These foci convert ceramide to sphingomyelin to promote migrasome formation at these sites. Sphingomyelin is not only a structural component of migrasomes, but it contributes to the actual formation and growth of the organelle.

Other proteins such as tetraspanins also contribute to the creation and organization of migrasomes. Researchers determined the role of these proteins by using short hairpin RNA (shRNA) to knockdown genes encoding proteins that are present on migrasomes. The knockdown of certain genes that reduced migrasome formation, but did not have a major impact on retraction fiber formation, indicated that these genes were likely to have direct involvement in migrasome formation as opposed to an indirect effect through mechanisms like migration, adhesion, and formation of retraction fibers.

== Development ==
Migrasomes have also been shown to provide localized signals during embryonic development. Jiang and team demonstrated this role in zebrafish embryos during gastrulation, which is a stage of development characterized by large amounts of coordinated cell migration. It was found that migrasomes formed during zebrafish gastrulation and that signalling molecules like chemokines are enriched in migrasomes.

Embryonic cells were determined to be generating long projections and vesicles that largely resembled the migrasomes on retraction fibers that had been previously observed in cultured mammalian cells. It is the belief of the researchers that these projections and vesicles are therefore retraction fibers and migrasomes. They observed that migrasomes were produced by migrating embryonic cells and that they were concentrated in certain regions of the developing embryo. Migrasomes were found to help attract and position dorsal forerunner cells near the embryonic shield, affecting organ morphogenesis.

The researchers also studied zebrafish embryos in which the genes *tspan4a *or *tspan7 *were disrupted. These embryos produced fewer migrasomes and later developed abnormalities in several organs. They specifically looked at the liver primordium, pancreatic bud, intestinal bulb, heart tubes, and pronephric tubule. Some embryos also showed laterality defects like abnormal organ positioning.

When purified migrasomes were injected into some of these mutant embryos, the organ-development defects were partially reduced. Based on these results, the researchers concluded that migrasomes act as signalling organelles that provide localized biochemical information that were shown to help coordinate cell positioning and organ morphogenesis during zebrafish development.

== Communication ==
Migrasomes can communicate with surrounding cells by releasing signaling proteins and other cellular materials. They play an important role in the delivery of signalling molecules like chemokines, cytokines, and angiogenic factors. A study by Jiao and colleagues examined how secretory proteins enter migrasomes and how they are released from them.

The researchers found that secretory carriers from two different secretion pathways can be redirected toward the rear of the cell. This is where the retraction fibers and migrasomes are located, so the motor protein Myosin-5a is able to help move these carriers along actin fibers and into developing migrasomes. Once these carriers are at the migrasomes, they fuse with the migrasome membrane through SNARE-mediated mechanisms.

Secretion was more active at migrasomes than it was at the main cell body. They found that when migrasome formation is inhibited, secretion is significantly reduced. This suggests that migrasomes serve as a principal secretion route in migrating cells.

The study concluded that migrasomes provide specialized, highly localized secretion frameworks in migrating cells. While migrasomes are still connected to the cell, they receive and release secretory materials. After they detach, they can carry these materials and release them into the surrounding environment.

== Disease Relevance ==
The role of migrasomes in haemostasis, the process that limits bleeding after injury, was examined in a 2024 study of neutrophil-derived migrasomes in mice and humans.

Neutrophils generate a lot of migrasomes in the blood. Researchers compared neutrophil-derived migrasomes with neutrophil cell bodies and platelets, and they were found to absorb and enrich coagulation factors on their surfaces. They also contain adhesion molecules on their surface, allowing them to accumulate at sites of blood-vessel injury. At these sites, they are able to trigger platelet activation and clot formation. Reducing the number of neutrophils or genetically reducing migrasome production was found to impair platelet-plug formation and coagulation in mice, while injecting purified neutrophil-derived migrasomes helped restore these effects.

The study concluded that these neutrophil-derived migrasomes are an important part of the haemostasis process. The findings support the idea that migrasomes contribute to blood clotting after injury by carrying adhesion molecules and concentrating coagulation factors. These findings may help improve our understanding of coagulation disorders and could have therapeutic significance.
