= Α-amyrin synthase =

Class of enzymes

α-Amyrin synthase

Identifiers
- EC no.: 5.4.99.40

Databases
- IntEnz: IntEnz view
- BRENDA: BRENDA entry
- ExPASy: NiceZyme view
- KEGG: KEGG entry
- MetaCyc: metabolic pathway
- PRIAM: profile
- PDB structures: RCSB PDB PDBe PDBsum
Search
- PMC: articles
- PubMed: articles
- NCBI: proteins

α-Amyrin synthase (EC 5.4.99.40, 2,3-oxidosqualene alpha-amyrin cyclase, mixed amyrin synthase) is an enzyme with systematic name (3S)-2,3-epoxy-2,3-dihydrosqualene mutase (cyclizing, alpha-amyrin-forming). This enzyme catalyses the following chemical reaction

(3S)-2,3-epoxy-2,3-dihydrosqualene $\rightleftharpoons$ alpha-amyrin

This multifunctional enzyme produces both alpha- and beta-amyrin.
