= Baccharis oxide synthase =

Class of enzymes

Identifiers
- EC no.: 5.4.99.51

Databases
- IntEnz: IntEnz view
- BRENDA: BRENDA entry
- ExPASy: NiceZyme view
- KEGG: KEGG entry
- MetaCyc: metabolic pathway
- PRIAM: profile
- PDB structures: RCSB PDB PDBe PDBsum
Search
- PMC: articles
- PubMed: articles
- NCBI: proteins

Baccharis oxide synthase (EC 5.4.99.51) is an enzyme with systematic name (3S)-2,3-epoxy-2,3-dihydrosqualene mutase (cyclizing, baccharis-oxide-forming). This enzyme catalyses the following chemical reaction

(3S)-2,3-epoxy-2,3-dihydrosqualene $\rightleftharpoons$ baccharis oxide

The enzyme from Stevia rebaudiana also gives traces of other triterpenoids.
