= Protostadienol synthase =

Class of enzymes

Identifiers
- EC no.: 5.4.99.32

Databases
- IntEnz: IntEnz view
- BRENDA: BRENDA entry
- ExPASy: NiceZyme view
- KEGG: KEGG entry
- MetaCyc: metabolic pathway
- PRIAM: profile
- PDB structures: RCSB PDB PDBe PDBsum
Search
- PMC: articles
- PubMed: articles
- NCBI: proteins

Protostadienol synthase (EC 5.4.99.32, PdsA, (S)-2,3-epoxysqualene mutase [cyclizing, (17Z)-protosta-17(20),24-dien-3beta-ol-forming]) is an enzyme with systematic name (3S)-2,3-epoxy-2,3-dihydrosqualene mutase (cyclizing, (17Z)-protosta-17(20),24-dien-3beta-ol-forming). This enzyme catalyses the following chemical reaction

(3S)-2,3-epoxy-2,3-dihydrosqualene $\rightleftharpoons$ (17Z)-protosta-17(20),24-dien-3beta-ol

(17Z)-Protosta-17(20),24-dien-3beta-ol is a precursor of the steroidal antibiotic helvolic acid.
