= List of EC numbers (EC 5) =

This list contains a list of EC numbers for the fifth group, EC 5, isomerases, placed in numerical order as determined by the Nomenclature Committee of the International Union of Biochemistry and Molecular Biology. All official information is tabulated at the website of the committee. The database is developed and maintained by Andrew McDonald.

== EC 5.1: Epimerases and racemases ==
=== EC 5.1.1: Acting on Amino acids and Derivatives ===
- EC 5.1.1.1: alanine racemase
- EC 5.1.1.2: methionine racemase
- EC 5.1.1.3: glutamate racemase
- EC 5.1.1.4: proline racemase
- EC 5.1.1.5: lysine racemase
- EC 5.1.1.6: threonine racemase
- EC 5.1.1.7: diaminopimelate epimerase
- EC 5.1.1.8: 4-hydroxyproline epimerase
- EC 5.1.1.9: arginine racemase
- EC 5.1.1.10: amino-acid racemase
- EC 5.1.1.11: phenylalanine racemase (ATP-hydrolysing)
- EC 5.1.1.12: ornithine racemase
- EC 5.1.1.13: aspartate racemase
- EC 5.1.1.14: nocardicin-A epimerase
- EC 5.1.1.15: 2-aminohexano-6-lactam racemase
- EC 5.1.1.16: protein-serine epimerase
- EC 5.1.1.17: isopenicillin-N epimerase
- EC 5.1.1.18: serine racemase
- EC 5.1.1.20: L-Ala-D/L-Glu epimerase
- EC 5.1.1.21: isoleucine 2-epimerase
- EC 5.1.1.22: 4-hydroxyproline betaine 2-epimerase
- EC 5.1.1.23: UDP-N-acetyl-α-D-muramoyl-L-alanyl-L-glutamate epimerase
- EC 5.1.1.24: histidine racemase

=== EC 5.1.2: Acting on Hydroxy acids and Derivatives ===
- EC 5.1.2.1: lactate racemase
- EC 5.1.2.2: mandelate racemase
- EC 5.1.2.3: 3-hydroxybutyryl-CoA epimerase
- EC 5.1.2.4: acetoin racemase
- EC 5.1.2.5: tartrate epimerase
- EC 5.1.2.6: isocitrate epimerase
- EC 5.1.2.7: tagaturonate epimerase

=== EC 5.1.3: Acting on Carbohydrates and Derivatives ===
- EC 5.1.3.1: ribulose-phosphate 3-epimerase
- EC 5.1.3.2: UDP-glucose 4-epimerase
- EC 5.1.3.3: aldose 1-epimerase
- EC 5.1.3.4: L-ribulose-5-phosphate 4-epimerase
- EC 5.1.3.5: UDP-arabinose 4-epimerase
- EC 5.1.3.6: UDP-glucuronate 4-epimerase
- EC 5.1.3.7: UDP-N-acetylglucosamine 4-epimerase
- EC 5.1.3.8: N-acylglucosamine 2-epimerase
- EC 5.1.3.9: N-acylglucosamine-6-phosphate 2-epimerase
- EC 5.1.3.10: CDP-paratose 2-epimerase
- EC 5.1.3.11: cellobiose epimerase
- EC 5.1.3.12: The enzyme has never been purified and the activity was later shown not to exist
- EC 5.1.3.13: dTDP-4-dehydrorhamnose 3,5-epimerase
- EC 5.1.3.14: UDP-N-acetylglucosamine 2-epimerase (non-hydrolysing)
- EC 5.1.3.15: glucose-6-phosphate 1-epimerase
- EC 5.1.3.16: UDP-glucosamine 4-epimerase
- EC 5.1.3.17: heparosan-N-sulfate-glucuronate 5-epimerase
- EC 5.1.3.18: GDP-mannose 3,5-epimerase
- EC 5.1.3.19: chondroitin-glucuronate 5-epimerase
- EC 5.1.3.20: ADP-glyceromanno-heptose 6-epimeras
- EC 5.1.3.21: maltose epimerase
- EC 5.1.3.22: L-ribulose-5-phosphate 3-epimerase
- EC 5.1.3.23: UDP-2,3-diacetamido-2,3-dideoxyglucuronic acid 2-epimerase
- EC 5.1.3.24: N-acetylneuraminate epimerase
- EC 5.1.3.25: dTDP-L-rhamnose 4-epimerase
- EC 5.1.3.26: N-acetyl-α-D-glucosaminyl-diphospho-ditrans,octacis-undecaprenol 4-epimerase
- EC 5.1.3.27: dTDP-4-dehydro-6-deoxy-D-glucose 3-epimerase
- EC 5.1.3.28: UDP-N-acetyl-L-fucosamine synthase
- EC 5.1.3.29: L-fucose mutarotase
- EC 5.1.3.30: D-psicose 3-epimerase
- EC 5.1.3.31: D-tagatose 3-epimerase
- EC 5.1.3.32: L-rhamnose mutarotase
- EC 5.1.3.33: 2-epi-5-epi-valiolone epimerase
- EC 5.1.3.34: monoglucosyldiacylglycerol epimerase
- EC 5.1.3.35: 2-epi-5-epi-valiolone 7-phosphate 2-epimerase
- EC 5.1.3.36: heparosan-glucuronate 5-epimerase
- EC 5.1.3.37: mannuronan 5-epimerase
- EC 5.1.3.38: D-erythrulose 1-phosphate 3-epimerase
- EC 5.1.3.39: L-erythrulose 4-phosphate epimerase. The activity has been shown not to take place.
- EC 5.1.3.40: D-tagatose 6-phosphate 4-epimerase
- EC 5.1.3.41: fructoselysine 3-epimerase
- EC 5.1.3.42: D-glucosamine-6-phosphate 4-epimerase
- EC 5.1.3.43: sulfoquinovose mutarotase
- EC 5.1.3.44: mannose 2-epimerase

=== EC 5.1.99: Acting on Other Compounds ===
- EC 5.1.99.1: methylmalonyl-CoA epimerase
- EC 5.1.99.2: 16-hydroxysteroid epimerase
- EC 5.1.99.3: allantoin racemase
- EC 5.1.99.4: α-methylacyl-CoA racemase
- EC 5.1.99.5: hydantoin racemase
- EC 5.1.99.6: NAD(P)H-hydrate epimerase
- EC 5.1.99.7: dihydroneopterin triphosphate 2′-epimerase
- EC 5.1.99.8: 7,8-dihydroneopterin epimerase

== EC 5.2: cis-trans-Isomerases ==
=== EC 5.2.1: cis-trans Isomerases (only sub-subclass identified to date) ===
- EC 5.2.1.1: maleate isomerase
- EC 5.2.1.2: maleylacetoacetate isomerase
- EC 5.2.1.3: Now known to be catalysed by a pathway involving EC 1.1.1.300, NADP-retinol dehydrogenase; EC 2.3.1.135, phosphatidylcholine—retinol O-acyltransferase; EC 3.1.1.64, retinoid isomerohydrolase; and EC 1.1.1.315, 11-cis-retinol dehydrogenase.
- EC 5.2.1.4: maleylpyruvate isomerase
- EC 5.2.1.5: linoleate isomerase
- EC 5.2.1.6: furylfuramide isomerase
- EC 5.2.1.7: transferred to EC 3.1.1.64, retinoid isomerohydrolase
- EC 5.2.1.8: peptidylprolyl isomerase
- EC 5.2.1.9: farnesol 2-isomerase
- EC 5.2.1.10: 2-chloro-4-carboxymethylenebut-2-en-1,4-olide isomerase
- EC 5.2.1.11: DELETED "4-hydroxyphenylacetaldehyde-oxime isomerase" – The existence of this enzyme has been called into question by one of the authors of the reference cited
- EC 5.2.1.12: ζ-carotene isomerase
- EC 5.2.1.13: prolycopene isomerase
- EC 5.2.1.14: β-carotene isomerase

== EC 5.3: Intramolecular Oxidoreductases ==
=== EC 5.3.1: Interconverting Aldoses and Ketoses ===
- EC 5.3.1.1: triose-phosphate isomerase
- EC 5.3.1.2: deleted
- EC 5.3.1.3: D-arabinose isomerase
- EC 5.3.1.4: L-arabinose isomerase
- EC 5.3.1.5: xylose isomerase
- EC 5.3.1.6: ribose-5-phosphate isomerase
- EC 5.3.1.7: mannose isomerase
- EC 5.3.1.8: mannose-6-phosphate isomerase
- EC 5.3.1.9: glucose-6-phosphate isomerase
- EC 5.3.1.10: Now EC 3.5.99.6, glucosamine-6-phosphate deaminase
- EC 5.3.1.11: deleted
- EC 5.3.1.12: glucuronate isomerase
- EC 5.3.1.13: arabinose-5-phosphate isomerase
- EC 5.3.1.14: L-rhamnose isomerase
- EC 5.3.1.15: D-lyxose ketol-isomerase
- EC 5.3.1.16: 1-(5-phosphoribosyl)-5-[(5-phosphoribosylamino)methylideneamino]imidazole-4-carboxamide isomerase
- EC 5.3.1.17: 5-dehydro-4-deoxy-D-glucuronate isomerase
- EC 5.3.1.18: deleted: reaction is due to EC 5.3.1.9 glucose-6-phosphate isomerase, in the presence of arsenate, or EC 5.3.1.5 xylose isomerase
- EC 5.3.1.19: Now EC 2.6.1.16, glutamine—fructose-6-phosphate transaminase (isomerizing)
- EC 5.3.1.20: ribose isomerase
- EC 5.3.1.21: corticosteroid side-chain-isomerase
- EC 5.3.1.22: hydroxypyruvate isomerase
- EC 5.3.1.23: S-methyl-5-thioribose-1-phosphate isomerase
- EC 5.3.1.24: phosphoribosylanthranilate isomerase
- EC 5.3.1.25: L-fucose isomerase
- EC 5.3.1.26: galactose-6-phosphate isomerase
- EC 5.3.1.27: 6-phospho-3-hexuloisomerase
- EC 5.3.1.28: D-sedoheptulose 7-phosphate isomerase
- EC 5.3.1.29: ribose 1,5-bisphosphate isomerase
- EC 5.3.1.30: 5-deoxy-glucuronate isomerase
- EC 5.3.1.31: sulfoquinovose isomerase
- EC 5.3.1.32: (4S)-4-hydroxy-5-phosphooxypentane-2,3-dione isomerase
- EC 5.3.1.33: L-erythrulose 1-phosphate isomerase
- EC 5.3.1.34: D-erythrulose 4-phosphate isomerase
- EC 5.3.1.35: 2-dehydrotetronate isomerase
- EC 5.3.1.36: D-apiose isomerase

=== EC 5.3.2: Interconverting Keto- and Enol-Groups ===
- EC 5.3.2.1: phenylpyruvate tautomerase
- EC 5.3.2.2: oxaloacetate tautomerase
- EC 5.3.2.3: TDP-4-oxo-6-deoxy-α-glucose-3,4-oxoisomerase (dTDP-3-dehydro-6-deoxy-α-D-galactopyranose-forming)
- EC 5.3.2.4: TDP-4-oxo-6-deoxy-α-D-glucose-3,4-oxoisomerase (dTDP-3-dehydro-6-deoxy-α-D-glucopyranose-forming)
- EC 5.3.2.5: 2,3-diketo-5-methylthiopentyl-1-phosphate enolase
- EC 5.3.2.6: 2-hydroxymuconate tautomerase
- EC 5.3.2.7: ascopyrone tautomerase
- EC 5.3.2.8: 4-oxalomesaconate tautomerase

=== EC 5.3.3: Transposing C=C Bonds ===
- EC 5.3.3.1: steroid Δ-isomerase
- EC 5.3.3.2: isopentenyl-diphosphate Δ-isomerase
- EC 5.3.3.3: vinylacetyl-CoA Δ-isomerase
- EC 5.3.3.4: muconolactone Δ-isomerase
- EC 5.3.3.5: cholestenol Δ-isomerase
- EC 5.3.3.6: methylitaconate Δ-isomerase
- EC 5.3.3.7: aconitate Δ-isomerase
- EC 5.3.3.8: Δ^{3}-Δ^{2}-enoyl-CoA isomerase
- EC 5.3.3.9: prostaglandin-A_{1} Δ-isomerase
- EC 5.3.3.10: 5-carboxymethyl-2-hydroxymuconate Δ-isomerase
- EC 5.3.3.11: isopiperitenone Δ-isomerase
- EC 5.3.3.12: L-dopachrome isomerase
- EC 5.3.3.13: polyenoic fatty acid isomerase
- EC 5.3.3.14: trans-2-decenoyl-[acyl-carrier protein] isomerase
- EC 5.3.3.15: Now EC 5.3.2.7, ascopyrone tautomerase
- EC 5.3.3.16: Now EC 5.3.2.8, 4-oxalomesaconate tautomerase
- EC 5.3.3.17: trans-2,3-dihydro-3-hydroxyanthranilate isomerase
- EC 5.3.3.18: 2-(1,2-epoxy-1,2-dihydrophenyl)acetyl-CoA isomerase
- EC 5.3.3.19: 3-[(4R)-4-hydroxycyclohexa-1,5-dien-1-yl]-2-oxopropanoate isomerase
- EC 5.3.3.20: Now EC 5.4.99.64, 2-hydroxyisobutanoyl-CoA mutase
- EC 5.3.3.21: Δ^{3,5}-Δ^{2,4}-dienoyl-CoA isomerase
- EC 5.3.3.22: lutein isomerase
- EC 5.3.3.23: S-methyl-5-thioribulose 1-phosphate isomerase

=== EC 5.3.4: Transposing S-S Bonds ===
- EC 5.3.4.1: protein disulfide-isomerase

=== EC 5.3.99: Other Intramolecular Oxidoreductases ===
- EC 5.3.99.1: deleted, reaction due to combined action of EC 4.2.1.92 (hydroperoxide dehydratase) and EC 5.3.99.6 (allene-oxide cyclase)
- EC 5.3.99.2: prostaglandin-D synthase
- EC 5.3.99.3: prostaglandin-E synthase
- EC 5.3.99.4: prostaglandin-I synthase
- EC 5.3.99.5: thromboxane-A synthase
- EC 5.3.99.6: allene-oxide cyclase
- EC 5.3.99.7: styrene-oxide isomerase
- EC 5.3.99.8: capsanthin/capsorubin synthase
- EC 5.3.99.9: neoxanthin synthase
- EC 5.3.99.10: thiazole tautomerase
- EC 5.3.99.11: 2-keto-myo-inositol isomerase
- EC 5.3.99.12: lachrymatory factor synthase

== EC 5.4: Intramolecular Transferases ==
=== EC 5.4.1: Transferring Acyl Groups ===
- EC 5.4.1.1: lysolecithin acylmutase
- EC 5.4.1.2: Now EC 5.4.99.61, precorrin-8X methylmutase
- EC 5.4.1.3: 2-methylfumaryl-CoA isomerase
- EC 5.4.1.4: D-galactarolactone isomerase

=== EC 5.4.2: Phosphotransferases (Phosphomutases) ===
- EC 5.4.2.1: Now recognized as two separate enzymes EC 5.4.2.11, phosphoglycerate mutase (2,3-diphosphoglycerate-dependent) and EC 5.4.2.12, phosphoglycerate mutase (2,3-diphosphoglycerate-independent)
- EC 5.4.2.2: phosphoglucomutase (α-D-glucose-1,6-bisphosphate-dependent)
- EC 5.4.2.3: phosphoacetylglucosamine mutase
- EC 5.4.2.4: bisphosphoglycerate mutase
- EC 5.4.2.5: phosphoglucomutase (glucose-cofactor)
- EC 5.4.2.6: β-phosphoglucomutase
- EC 5.4.2.7: phosphopentomutase
- EC 5.4.2.8: phosphomannomutase
- EC 5.4.2.9: phosphoenolpyruvate mutase
- EC 5.4.2.10: phosphoglucosamine mutase
- EC 5.4.2.11: phosphoglycerate mutase (2,3-diphosphoglycerate-dependent)
- EC 5.4.2.12: phosphoglycerate mutase (2,3-diphosphoglycerate-independent)
- EC 5.4.2.13: phosphogalactosamine mutase

=== EC 5.4.3: Transferring Amino Groups ===
- EC 5.4.3.1: deleted; this reaction was due to a mixture of EC 5.1.1.12 (ornithine racemase) and EC 5.4.3.5 (D-ornithine 4,5-aminomutase)
- EC 5.4.3.2: lysine 2,3-aminomutase
- EC 5.4.3.3: lysine 5,6-aminomutase
- EC 5.4.3.4: Now included in EC 5.4.3.3, lysine 5,6-aminomutase
- EC 5.4.3.5: D-ornithine 4,5-aminomutase
- EC 5.4.3.6: tyrosine 2,3-aminomutase
- EC 5.4.3.7: leucine 2,3-aminomutase
- EC 5.4.3.8: glutamate-1-semialdehyde 2,1-aminomutase
- EC 5.4.3.9: glutamate 2,3-aminomutase
- EC 5.4.3.10: phenylalanine aminomutase (L-β-phenylalanine forming)
- EC 5.4.3.11: phenylalanine aminomutase (D-β-phenylalanine forming)

=== EC 5.4.4: Transferring hydroxy groups ===
- EC 5.4.4.1: (hydroxyamino)benzene mutase
- EC 5.4.4.2: isochorismate synthase
- EC 5.4.4.3: 3-(hydroxyamino)phenol mutase
- EC 5.4.4.4: geraniol isomerase
- EC 5.4.4.5: 9,12-octadecadienoate 8-hydroperoxide 8R-isomerase
- EC 5.4.4.6: 9,12-octadecadienoate 8-hydroperoxide 8S-isomerase
- EC 5.4.4.7: hydroperoxy icosatetraenoate isomerase
- EC 5.4.4.8: linalool isomerase
- EC 5.4.4.9: pyrogallol hydroxytransferase

=== EC 5.4.99: Transferring Other Groups ===
- EC 5.4.99.1: methylaspartate mutase
- EC 5.4.99.2: methylmalonyl-CoA mutase
- EC 5.4.99.3: 2-acetolactate mutase
- EC 5.4.99.4: 2-methyleneglutarate mutase
- EC 5.4.99.5: chorismate mutase
- EC 5.4.99.6: Now EC 5.4.4.2, isochorismate synthase
- EC 5.4.99.7: lanosterol synthase
- EC 5.4.99.8: cycloartenol synthase
- EC 5.4.99.9: UDP-galactopyranose mutase
- EC 5.4.99.10: Now included with EC 5.4.99.11, isomaltulose synthase
- EC 5.4.99.11: isomaltulose synthase
- EC 5.4.99.12: tRNA pseudouridine^{38-40} synthase
- EC 5.4.99.13: isobutyryl-CoA mutase
- EC 5.4.99.14: 4-carboxymethyl-4-methylbutenolide mutase
- EC 5.4.99.15: (1→4)-α-D-glucan 1-α-D-glucosylmutase
- EC 5.4.99.16: maltose α-D-glucosyltransferase
- EC 5.4.99.17: squalene—hopene cyclase
- EC 5.4.99.18: 5-(carboxyamino)imidazole ribonucleotide mutase
- EC 5.4.99.19: 16S rRNA pseudouridine^{516} synthase
- EC 5.4.99.20: 23S rRNA pseudouridine^{2457} synthase
- EC 5.4.99.21: 23S rRNA pseudouridine^{2604} synthase
- EC 5.4.99.22: 23S rRNA pseudouridine^{2605} synthase
- EC 5.4.99.23: 23S rRNA pseudouridine^{1911/1915/1917} synthase
- EC 5.4.99.24: 23S rRNA pseudouridine^{955/2504/2580} synthase
- EC 5.4.99.25: tRNA pseudouridine^{55} synthase
- EC 5.4.99.26: tRNA pseudouridine^{65} synthase
- EC 5.4.99.27: tRNA pseudouridine^{13} synthase
- EC 5.4.99.28: RNA pseudouridine^{32} synthase
- EC 5.4.99.29: 23S rRNA pseudouridine^{746} synthase
- EC 5.4.99.30: UDP-arabinopyranose mutase
- EC 5.4.99.31: thalianol synthase
- EC 5.4.99.32: protostadienol synthase
- EC 5.4.99.33: cucurbitadienol synthase
- EC 5.4.99.34: germanicol synthase
- EC 5.4.99.35: taraxerol synthase
- EC 5.4.99.36: isomultiflorenol synthase
- EC 5.4.99.37: dammaradiene synthase
- EC 5.4.99.38: camelliol C synthase
- EC 5.4.99.39: β-amyrin synthase
- EC 5.4.99.40: α-amyrin synthase
- EC 5.4.99.41: lupeol synthase
- EC 5.4.99.42: tRNA pseudouridine^{31} synthase
- EC 5.4.99.43: 21S rRNA pseudouridine^{2819} synthase
- EC 5.4.99.44: mitochondrial tRNA pseudouridine^{27/28} synthase
- EC 5.4.99.45: tRNA pseudouridine^{38/39} synthase
- EC 5.4.99.46: shionone synthase
- EC 5.4.99.47: parkeol synthase
- EC 5.4.99.48: achilleol B synthase
- EC 5.4.99.49: glutinol synthase
- EC 5.4.99.50: friedelin synthase
- EC 5.4.99.51: baccharis oxide synthase
- EC 5.4.99.52: α-seco-amyrin synthase
- EC 5.4.99.53: marneral synthase
- EC 5.4.99.54: β-seco-amyrin synthase
- EC 5.4.99.55: δ-amyrin synthase
- EC 5.4.99.56: tirucalladienol synthase
- EC 5.4.99.57: baruol synthase
- EC 5.4.99.58: methylornithine synthase
- EC 5.4.99.59: dTDP-fucopyranose mutase
- EC 5.4.99.60: cobalt-precorrin-8 methylmutase
- EC 5.4.99.61: precorrin-8X methylmutase
- EC 5.4.99.62: D-ribose pyranase
- EC 5.4.99.63: ethylmalonyl-CoA mutase
- EC 5.4.99.64: 2-hydroxyisobutanoyl-CoA mutase
- EC 5.4.99.65: pre-α-onocerin synthase
- EC 5.4.99.66: α-onocerin synthase
- EC 5.4.99.67: 4-amino-4-deoxychorismate mutase

== EC 5.5: Intramolecular Lyases ==
=== EC 5.5.1: Intramolecular lyases (only sub-subclass identified to date) ===
- EC 5.5.1.1: muconate cycloisomerase
- EC 5.5.1.2: 3-carboxy-cis,cis-muconate cycloisomerase
- EC 5.5.1.3: tetrahydroxypteridine cycloisomerase
- EC 5.5.1.4: inositol-3-phosphate synthase
- EC 5.5.1.5: carboxy-cis,cis-muconate cyclase
- EC 5.5.1.6: chalcone isomerase
- EC 5.5.1.7: chloromuconate cycloisomerase
- EC 5.5.1.8: (+)-bornyl diphosphate synthase
- EC 5.5.1.9: cycloeucalenol cycloisomerase
- EC 5.5.1.10: α-pinene-oxide decyclase
- EC 5.5.1.11: dichloromuconate cycloisomerase
- EC 5.5.1.12: copalyl diphosphate synthase
- EC 5.5.1.13: ent-copalyl diphosphate synthase
- EC 5.5.1.14: syn-copalyl-diphosphate synthase
- EC 5.5.1.15: terpentedienyl-diphosphate synthase
- EC 5.5.1.16: halimadienyl-diphosphate synthase
- EC 5.5.1.17: (S)-β-macrocarpene synthase
- EC 5.5.1.18: lycopene ε-cyclase
- EC 5.5.1.19: lycopene β-cyclase
- EC 5.5.1.20: prosolanapyrone-III cycloisomerase
- EC 5.5.1.21: copal-8-ol diphosphate synthase. The enzyme was discovered at the public-review stage to have been misclassified and so was withdrawn. See EC 4.2.1.133, copal-8-ol diphosphate hydratase
- EC 5.5.1.22: (–)-bornyl diphosphate synthase
- EC 5.5.1.23: aklanonic acid methyl ester cyclase
- EC 5.5.1.24: tocopherol cyclase
- EC 5.5.1.25: 3,6-anhydro-L-galactonate cycloisomerase
- EC 5.5.1.26: nogalonic acid methyl ester cyclase
- EC 5.5.1.27: D-galactarolactone cycloisomerase
- EC 5.5.1.28: (–)-kolavenyl diphosphate synthase
- EC 5.5.1.29: (+)-kolavenyl diphosphate synthase
- EC 5.5.1.30: labda-7,13-dienyl diphosphate synthase
- EC 5.5.1.31: hapalindole H synthase
- EC 5.5.1.32: 12-epi-hapalindole U synthase
- EC 5.5.1.33: 12-epi-fischerindole U synthase
- EC 5.5.1.34: (+)-cis,trans-nepetalactol synthase
- EC 5.5.1.35: (+)-cis,cis-nepetalactol synthase
- EC 5.5.1.36: hapalindole U synthase
- EC 5.5.1.37: catharanthine synthase
- EC 5.5.1.38: tabersonine synthase

== EC 5.6: Isomerases altering macromolecular conformation ==
=== EC 5.6.1: Enzymes altering polypeptide conformation or assembly ===
- EC 5.6.1.1: microtubule-severing ATPase
- EC 5.6.1.2: dynein ATPase
- EC 5.6.1.3: plus-end-directed kinesin ATPase
- EC 5.6.1.4: minus-end-directed kinesin ATPase
- EC 5.6.1.5: proteasome ATPase
- EC 5.6.1.6: channel-conductance-controlling ATPase
- EC 5.6.1.7: chaperonin ATPase
- EC 5.6.1.8: myosin ATPase
- EC 5.6.1.9: (R)-2-hydroxyacyl-CoA dehydratase activating ATPase

=== EC 5.6.2: Enzymes altering nucleic acid conformation ===
- EC 5.6.2.1: DNA topoisomerase
- EC 5.6.2.2: DNA topoisomerase (ATP-hydrolyzing)
- EC 5.6.2.3: DNA 5'-3' helicase
- EC 5.6.2.4: DNA 3'-5' helicase

== EC 5.99: Other Isomerases ==
=== EC 5.99.1: Sole sub-subclass for isomerases that do not belong in the other subclasses ===
- EC 5.99.1.1: thiocyanate isomerase
- EC 5.99.1.2: Now EC 5.6.2.1, DNA topoisomerase
- EC 5.99.1.3: Now EC 5.6.2.2, DNA topoisomerase (ATP-hydrolysing)
- EC 5.99.1.4: 2-hydroxychromene-2-carboxylate isomerase
