= Pseudouridine synthase =

Pseudouridine synthases catalyze the post-transcriptional modification of RNA nucleoside uridine to pseudouridine. Pseudouridine synthase may refer to:

== rRNA ==
- 16S rRNA pseudouridine^{516} synthase
- 23S rRNA pseudouridine^{746} synthase
- 23S rRNA pseudouridine^{955/2504/2580} synthase
- 23S rRNA pseudouridine^{1911/1915/1917} synthase

== tRNA ==
- Mitochondrial tRNA pseudouridine^{27/28} synthase
- tRNA-pseudouridine synthase I
- tRNA pseudouridine^{13} synthase
- tRNA pseudouridine^{38/39} synthase
- tRNA pseudouridine^{55} synthase

== See also ==
- Pseudouridine § Synthases
- Pseudouridylate synthase
