= TDP-4-oxo-6-deoxy-alpha-D-glucose-3,4-oxoisomerase =

TDP-4-oxo-6-deoxy-alpha-D-glucose-3,4-oxoisomerase may refer to:

- TDP-4-oxo-6-deoxy-alpha-D-glucose-3,4-oxoisomerase (dTDP-3-dehydro-6-deoxy-alpha-D-galactopyranose-forming), an enzyme
- TDP-4-oxo-6-deoxy-alpha-D-glucose-3,4-oxoisomerase (dTDP-3-dehydro-6-deoxy-alpha-D-glucopyranose-forming), an enzyme
