= RSUA =

RSUA may refer to:

- Royal Society of Ulster Architects
- 16S rRNA pseudouridine^{516} synthase, an enzyme
