= WBIB =

WBIB may refer to:

- WBIB (AM), a radio station (1110 AM) licensed to serve Centreville, Alabama, United States
- WBIB-FM, a radio station (89.1 FM) licensed to serve Forsyth, Georgia, United States
- DTDP-L-rhamnose 4-epimerase, an enzyme
