= Phi (disambiguation) =

Phi (Φ, φ, or ϕ) is the 21st letter of the Greek alphabet.

Phi or PHI may also refer to:

== Science and technology ==
=== Mathematics ===
- Golden ratio (φ)
- Phi coefficient, a measure of association for two binary variables introduced by Karl Pearson
- Euler's totient function or phi function
- Cyclotomic polynomial ($\Phi_n(x)$)
- Integrated information theory (IIT) the symbol of which is φ
- Standard normal distribution, $\Phi(x)$ notating its cumulative distribution function and $\phi(x)$ its probability density function

=== Physics, chemistry and biology ===
- Phi meson, in particle physics
- Magnetic flux (Φ)
- Peptide PHI (Peptide histidine isoleucine)
- 6-phospho-3-hexuloisomerase, an enzyme
- Phenyl group (Φ), a functional group in organic chemistry
- Pre-harvest interval
- pH(I), the isoelectric point

=== Computing ===
- Xeon Phi, an Intel MIC microprocessor
- Φ (Phi) function, in static single-assignment form compiler design
- Codename for the Nokia Lumia 920
- Phi (language model)

=== Medicine ===
- Permanent health insurance, against becoming disabled
- Protected health information, in US law

=== Other science ===
- Phi phenomenon, in visual perception
- Krumbein phi scale, for the size of a particle or sediment

== Arts and entertainment ==
- Phi (KinKi Kids album) (2007)
- Phi (Truckfighters album) (2007)
- Sailor Phi, a villain in the Sailor Moon manga
- Phi, a character in the visual novels Zero Escape: Virtue's Last Reward and Zero Escape: Zero Time Dilemma.
- Phi: A Voyage from the Brain to the Soul, a book by Giulio Tononi (2012)
- Phi, a character from Beyblade Burst Turbo, a TV show written by Hiro Morita

== Organizations ==
- Packard Humanities Institute
- Paraprofessional Healthcare Institute, a nonprofit organization based in New York City, US
- Pepco Holdings Inc.
- Petroleum Helicopters International, an American commercial helicopter operator
- Phi, a collegiate secret society at Princeton University
- Philadelphia’s major professional sports teams
  - Philadelphia Eagles of the National Football League
  - Philadelphia 76ers of the National Basketball Association
  - Philadelphia Phillies of Major League Baseball
  - Philadelphia Flyers of the National Hockey League
- Post-Polio Health International
- Prince Henry's Institute of Medical Research, a former research institute in Melbourne, Australia

== Other uses ==
- Voiceless bilabial fricative (IPA symbol: ɸ)
- Phi, a village in Sesant, Cambodia
- Phi, ghosts in Thai culture
- Philippines, IOC country code

== See also ==
- Փ, a letter of the Armenian alphabet
- PHI-base (Pathogen–Host Interaction database)
- Kamen Rider 555 or Masked Rider Φ's
