= Teni =

Teni may refer to:

- Teni (singer) (born 1992), Nigerian singer
- Thiazole tautomerase, enzyme
- Theni, town in India
- TENI, the Transgender Equality Network of Ireland
- The Russian title of Shadows, a 1953 Soviet film
