= WBPL =

WBPL may refer to:

- WBPL-LP, a radio station
- UDP-2,3-diacetamido-2,3-dideoxyglucuronic acid 2-epimerase, an enzyme
- West Branch Public Library (West Branch, Michigan)
- Women's Bangladesh Premier League, a women's cricket franchise league from Bangladesh
