= UDP-arabinose 4-epimerase =

Identifiers
- EC no.: 5.1.3.5
- CAS no.: 9024-18-4

Databases
- IntEnz: IntEnz view
- BRENDA: BRENDA entry
- ExPASy: NiceZyme view
- KEGG: KEGG entry
- MetaCyc: metabolic pathway
- PRIAM: profile
- PDB structures: RCSB PDB PDBe PDBsum
- Gene Ontology: AmiGO / QuickGO
Search
- PMC: articles
- PubMed: articles
- NCBI: proteins

In enzymology, an UDP-arabinose 4-epimerase (EC 5.1.3.5) is an enzyme that catalyzes the chemical reaction

UDP-L-arabinose $\rightleftharpoons$ UDP-D-xylose

Hence, this enzyme has one substrate, UDP-L-arabinose, and one product, UDP-D-xylose.

This enzyme belongs to the family of isomerases, specifically those racemases and epimerases acting on carbohydrates and derivatives. The systematic name of this enzyme class is UDP-L-arabinose 4-epimerase. Other names in common use include uridine diphosphoarabinose epimerase, UDP arabinose epimerase, uridine 5'-diphosphate-D-xylose 4-epimerase, and UDP-D-xylose 4-epimerase. This enzyme participates in nucleotide sugars metabolism.
