= Threonine racemase =

Class of enzymes

threonine racemase

Identifiers
- EC no.: 5.1.1.6
- CAS no.: 9024-11-7

Databases
- IntEnz: IntEnz view
- BRENDA: BRENDA entry
- ExPASy: NiceZyme view
- KEGG: KEGG entry
- MetaCyc: metabolic pathway
- PRIAM: profile
- PDB structures: RCSB PDB PDBe PDBsum
- Gene Ontology: AmiGO / QuickGO
Search
- PMC: articles
- PubMed: articles
- NCBI: proteins

In enzymology, a threonine racemase (EC 5.1.1.6) is an enzyme that catalyzes the chemical reaction

L-threonine $\rightleftharpoons$ D-threonine

Hence, this enzyme has one substrate, L-threonine, and one product, D-threonine.

This enzyme belongs to the family of isomerases, specifically those racemases and epimerases acting on amino acids and derivatives. The systematic name of this enzyme class is threonine racemase.
