= GDP-mannose 3,5-epimerase =

Identifiers
- EC no.: 5.1.3.18
- CAS no.: 72162-82-4

Databases
- IntEnz: IntEnz view
- BRENDA: BRENDA entry
- ExPASy: NiceZyme view
- KEGG: KEGG entry
- MetaCyc: metabolic pathway
- PRIAM: profile
- PDB structures: RCSB PDB PDBe PDBsum
- Gene Ontology: AmiGO / QuickGO
Search
- PMC: articles
- PubMed: articles
- NCBI: proteins

In enzymology, a GDP-mannose 3,5-epimerase (EC 5.1.3.18) is an enzyme that catalyzes the chemical reaction

GDP-mannose $\rightleftharpoons$ GDP-L-galactose + GDP-L-gulose - initial reaction overview (updated in 2020, see below)

Hence, this enzyme has one substrate, GDP-mannose, and two products, GDP-L-galactose and GDP-L-gulose

Since only GDP-L-gulose (the C5-epimer of GDP-D-mannose) was found in the reaction mixture, it was postulated that the enzyme performs the C5-epimerization prior to the C3-epimerization. However, GDP-D-altrose was recently found as a reaction product, which means that both reaction routes can occur: C5-prior-to-C3 and C3-prior-to-C5. This also means that the GDP-mannose 3,5-epimerase has three reaction products, namely the main product GDP-L-galactose (C3,5-epimer) and two sideproducts GDP-L-gulose (C5-epimer) + GDP-D-altrose (C3-epimer).

GDP-D-mannose $\rightleftharpoons$ GDP-L-galactose (C3,5-epimer) + GDP-L-gulose (C5-epimer) + GDP-D-altrose (C3-epimer) - reaction overview update in 2020

This enzyme belongs to the family of isomerases, specifically those racemases and epimerases acting on carbohydrates and derivatives. The systematic name of this enzyme class is GDP-mannose 3,5-epimerase. Other names in common use include GDP-D-mannose:GDP-L-galactose epimerase, guanosine 5'-diphosphate D-mannose:guanosine 5'-diphosphate, GM35E, and L-galactose epimerase. This enzyme participates in ascorbate and aldarate metabolism.

== Structural studies ==
As of late 2007, 4 structures have been solved for this class of enzymes, with PDB accession codes 2C54, 2C59, 2C5A, and 2C5E.
