= Maltose epimerase =

maltose epimerase

Identifiers
- EC no.: 5.1.3.21
- CAS no.: 166799-98-0

Databases
- IntEnz: IntEnz view
- BRENDA: BRENDA entry
- ExPASy: NiceZyme view
- KEGG: KEGG entry
- MetaCyc: metabolic pathway
- PRIAM: profile
- PDB structures: RCSB PDB PDBe PDBsum
- Gene Ontology: AmiGO / QuickGO
Search
- PMC: articles
- PubMed: articles
- NCBI: proteins

In enzymology, a maltose epimerase (EC 5.1.3.21) is an enzyme that catalyzes the chemical reaction

alpha-maltose $\rightleftharpoons$ beta-maltose

Hence, this enzyme has one substrate, alpha-maltose, and one product, beta-maltose.

This enzyme belongs to the family of isomerases, specifically those racemases and epimerases acting on carbohydrates and derivatives. The systematic name of this enzyme class is maltose 1-epimerase.
