= 3-hydroxybutyryl-CoA epimerase =

Class of enzymes

Identifiers
- EC no.: 5.1.2.3
- CAS no.: 9024-21-9

Databases
- IntEnz: IntEnz view
- BRENDA: BRENDA entry
- ExPASy: NiceZyme view
- KEGG: KEGG entry
- MetaCyc: metabolic pathway
- PRIAM: profile
- PDB structures: RCSB PDB PDBe PDBsum
- Gene Ontology: AmiGO / QuickGO
Search
- PMC: articles
- PubMed: articles
- NCBI: proteins

In enzymology, a 3-hydroxybutyryl-CoA epimerase (EC 5.1.2.3) is an enzyme that catalyzes the chemical reaction

(S)-3-hydroxybutanoyl-CoA $\rightleftharpoons$ (R)-3-hydroxybutanoyl-CoA

Hence, this enzyme has one substrate, (S)-3-hydroxybutanoyl-CoA, and one product, (R)-3-hydroxybutanoyl-CoA.

This enzyme belongs to the family of isomerases, specifically those racemases and epimerases acting on hydroxy acids and derivatives. The systematic name of this enzyme class is 3-hydroxybutanoyl-CoA 3-epimerase. Other names in common use include 3-hydroxybutyryl coenzyme A epimerase, and 3-hydroxyacyl-CoA epimerase. This enzyme participates in fatty acid metabolism and butanoate metabolism.

== Structural studies ==
As of late 2007, four structures have been solved for this class of enzymes, with PDB accession codes 1WDK, 1WDL, 1WDM, and 2D3T.
