= Lysine racemase =

lysine racemase

Identifiers
- EC no.: 5.1.1.5
- CAS no.: 9024-10-6

Databases
- IntEnz: IntEnz view
- BRENDA: BRENDA entry
- ExPASy: NiceZyme view
- KEGG: KEGG entry
- MetaCyc: metabolic pathway
- PRIAM: profile
- PDB structures: RCSB PDB PDBe PDBsum
- Gene Ontology: AmiGO / QuickGO
Search
- PMC: articles
- PubMed: articles
- NCBI: proteins

In enzymology, a lysine racemase (EC 5.1.1.5) is an enzyme that catalyzes the chemical reaction

L-lysine ⇌ D-lysine

Hence, this enzyme has one substrate, L-lysine, and one product, D-lysine.

This enzyme belongs to the family of isomerases, specifically those racemases and epimerases acting on amino acids and derivatives. The systematic name of this enzyme class is lysine racemase. This enzyme participates in lysine degradation.
