= DTDP-4-dehydrorhamnose 3,5-epimerase =

Enzyme

dTDP-4-dehydrorhamnose 3,5-epimerase
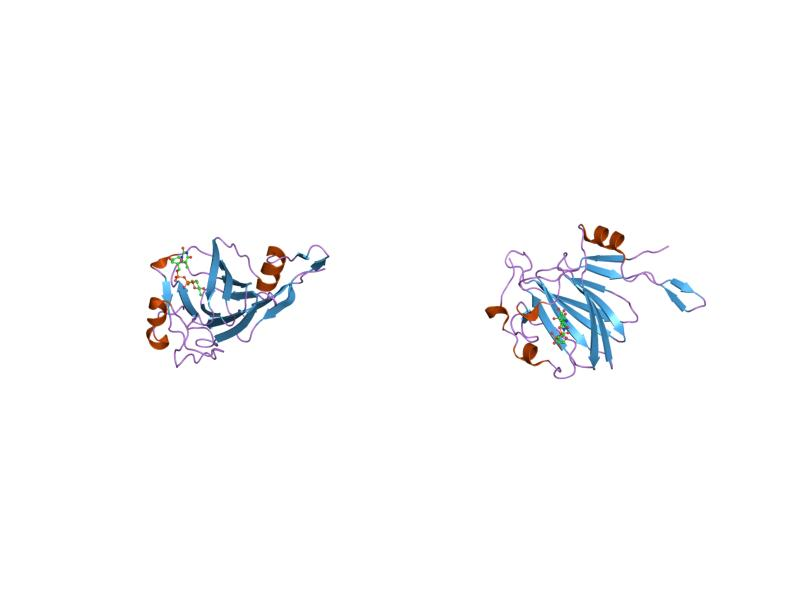
- rmlc p aeruginosa with dtdp-rhamnose

Identifiers
- Symbol: dTDP_sugar_isom
- Pfam: PF00908
- Pfam clan: CL0029
- InterPro: IPR000888
- SCOP2: 1epz / SCOPe / SUPFAM
Available protein structures:
- Pfam: structures / ECOD
- PDB: RCSB PDB; PDBe; PDBj
- PDBsum: structure summary

dTDP-4-dehydrorhamnose 3,5-epimerase

Identifiers
- EC no.: 5.1.3.13
- CAS no.: 37318-39-1

Databases
- IntEnz: IntEnz view
- BRENDA: BRENDA entry
- ExPASy: NiceZyme view
- KEGG: KEGG entry
- MetaCyc: metabolic pathway
- PRIAM: profile
- PDB structures: RCSB PDB PDBe PDBsum
- Gene Ontology: AmiGO / QuickGO
Search
- PMC: articles
- PubMed: articles
- NCBI: proteins

In enzymology, a dTDP-4-dehydrorhamnose 3,5-epimerase (EC 5.1.3.13) is an enzyme that catalyzes the chemical reaction

dTDP-4-dehydro-6-deoxy-D-glucose $\rightleftharpoons$ dTDP-4-dehydro-6-deoxy-L-mannose

Hence, this enzyme has one substrate, dTDP-4-dehydro-6-deoxy-D-glucose, and one product, dTDP-4-dehydro-6-deoxy-L-mannose.

This enzyme belongs to the family of isomerases, specifically those racemases and epimerases acting on carbohydrates and derivatives. The systematic name of this enzyme class is dTDP-4-dehydro-6-deoxy-D-glucose 3,5-epimerase. Other names in common use include dTDP-L-rhamnose synthetase, dTDP-L-rhamnose synthetase, thymidine diphospho-4-ketorhamnose 3,5-epimerase, TDP-4-ketorhamnose 3,5-epimerase, dTDP-4-dehydro-6-deoxy-D-glucose 3,5-epimerase, and TDP-4-keto-L-rhamnose-3,5-epimerase. This enzyme participates in 3 metabolic pathways: nucleotide sugars metabolism, streptomycin biosynthesis, and polyketide sugar unit biosynthesis.

== Structural studies ==
The crystal structure of RmlC from Methanobacterium thermoautotrophicum was determined in the presence and absence of a substrate analogue. RmlC is a homodimer comprising a central jelly roll motif, which extends in two directions into longer beta-sheets. Binding of dTDP is stabilised by ionic interactions to the phosphate group and by a combination of ionic and hydrophobic interactions with the base. The active site, which is located in the centre of the jelly roll, is formed by residues that are conserved in all known RmlC sequence homologues. The active site is lined with a number of charged residues and a number of residues with hydrogen-bonding potentials, which together comprise a potential network for substrate binding and catalysis. The active site is also lined with aromatic residues which provide favourable environments for the base moiety of dTDP and potentially for the sugar moiety of the substrate.

As of late 2007, 14 structures have been solved for this class of enzymes, with PDB accession codes 1DZR, 1DZT, 1EP0, 1EPZ, 1NXM, 1NYW, 1NZC, 1PM7, 1RTV, 1UPI, 1WLT, 2B9U, 2IXC, and 2IXL.
