= 2-aminohexano-6-lactam racemase =

Class of enzymes

Identifiers
- EC no.: 5.1.1.15
- CAS no.: 52652-64-9

Databases
- IntEnz: IntEnz view
- BRENDA: BRENDA entry
- ExPASy: NiceZyme view
- KEGG: KEGG entry
- MetaCyc: metabolic pathway
- PRIAM: profile
- PDB structures: RCSB PDB PDBe PDBsum
- Gene Ontology: AmiGO / QuickGO
Search
- PMC: articles
- PubMed: articles
- NCBI: proteins

In enzymology, a 2-aminohexano-6-lactam racemase (EC 5.1.1.15) is an enzyme that catalyzes the chemical reaction

L-2-aminohexano-6-lactam $\rightleftharpoons$ D-2-aminohexano-6-lactam

Hence, this enzyme has one substrate, L-2-aminohexano-6-lactam, and one product, D-2-aminohexano-6-lactam.

This enzyme belongs to the family of isomerases, specifically those racemases and epimerases acting on amino acids and derivatives. The systematic name of this enzyme class is 2-aminohexano-6-lactam racemase. This enzyme is also called alpha-amino-epsilon-caprolactam racemase.
