= CDP-paratose 2-epimerase =

CDP-abequose epimerase

Identifiers
- EC no.: 5.1.3.10
- CAS no.: 37318-36-8

Databases
- IntEnz: IntEnz view
- BRENDA: BRENDA entry
- ExPASy: NiceZyme view
- KEGG: KEGG entry
- MetaCyc: metabolic pathway
- PRIAM: profile
- PDB structures: RCSB PDB PDBe PDBsum
- Gene Ontology: AmiGO / QuickGO
Search
- PMC: articles
- PubMed: articles
- NCBI: proteins

In enzymology, a CDP-paratose 2-epimerase (EC 5.1.3.10) is an enzyme that catalyzes the chemical reaction

CDP-3,6-dideoxy-D-glucose $\rightleftharpoons$ CDP-3,6-dideoxy-D-mannose

Hence, this enzyme has one substrate, CDP-3,6-dideoxy-D-glucose, and one product, CDP-3,6-dideoxy-D-mannose.

This enzyme belongs to the family of isomerases, specifically those racemases and epimerases acting on carbohydrates and derivatives. The systematic name of this enzyme class is CDP-3,6-dideoxy-D-glucose 2-epimerase. Other names in common use include CDP-paratose epimerase, cytidine diphosphoabequose epimerase, cytidine diphosphodideoxyglucose epimerase, cytidine diphosphoparatose epimerase, and cytidine diphosphate paratose-2-epimerase. It is also incorrectly known as CDP-abequose epimerase, and CDP-D-abequose 2-epimerase. This enzyme participates in starch and sucrose metabolism. It employs one cofactor, NAD+.
