= 16-hydroxysteroid epimerase =

Class of enzymes

Identifiers
- EC no.: 5.1.99.2
- CAS no.: 37318-40-4

Databases
- IntEnz: IntEnz view
- BRENDA: BRENDA entry
- ExPASy: NiceZyme view
- KEGG: KEGG entry
- MetaCyc: metabolic pathway
- PRIAM: profile
- PDB structures: RCSB PDB PDBe PDBsum
- Gene Ontology: AmiGO / QuickGO
Search
- PMC: articles
- PubMed: articles
- NCBI: proteins

In enzymology, a 16-hydroxysteroid epimerase (EC 5.1.99.2) is an enzyme that catalyzes the chemical reaction

16alpha-hydroxysteroid $\rightleftharpoons$ 16beta-hydroxysteroid

Hence, this enzyme has one substrate, 16alpha-hydroxysteroid, and one product, 16beta-hydroxysteroid.

This enzyme belongs to the family of isomerases, specifically those racemases and epimerases acting on other compounds. The systematic name of this enzyme class is 16-hydroxysteroid 16-epimerase.
