= L-ribulose-5-phosphate 3-epimerase =

Identifiers
- EC no.: 5.1.3.22

Databases
- IntEnz: IntEnz view
- BRENDA: BRENDA entry
- ExPASy: NiceZyme view
- KEGG: KEGG entry
- MetaCyc: metabolic pathway
- PRIAM: profile
- PDB structures: RCSB PDB PDBe PDBsum
Search
- PMC: articles
- PubMed: articles
- NCBI: proteins

In enzymology, a L-ribulose-5-phosphate 3-epimerase (EC 5.1.3.22) is an enzyme that catalyzes the chemical reaction

L-ribulose 5-phosphate $\rightleftharpoons$ L-xylulose 5-phosphate

Hence, this enzyme has one substrate, L-ribulose 5-phosphate, and one product, L-xylulose 5-phosphate.

This enzyme belongs to the family of isomerases, specifically those racemases and epimerases acting on carbohydrates and derivatives. The systematic name of this enzyme class is L-ribulose-5-phosphate 3-epimerase. Other names in common use include L-xylulose 5-phosphate 3-epimerase, UlaE, and SgaU. This enzyme participates in ascorbate and aldarate metabolism.
