= UDP-N-acetylglucosamine 4-epimerase =

Class of enzymes

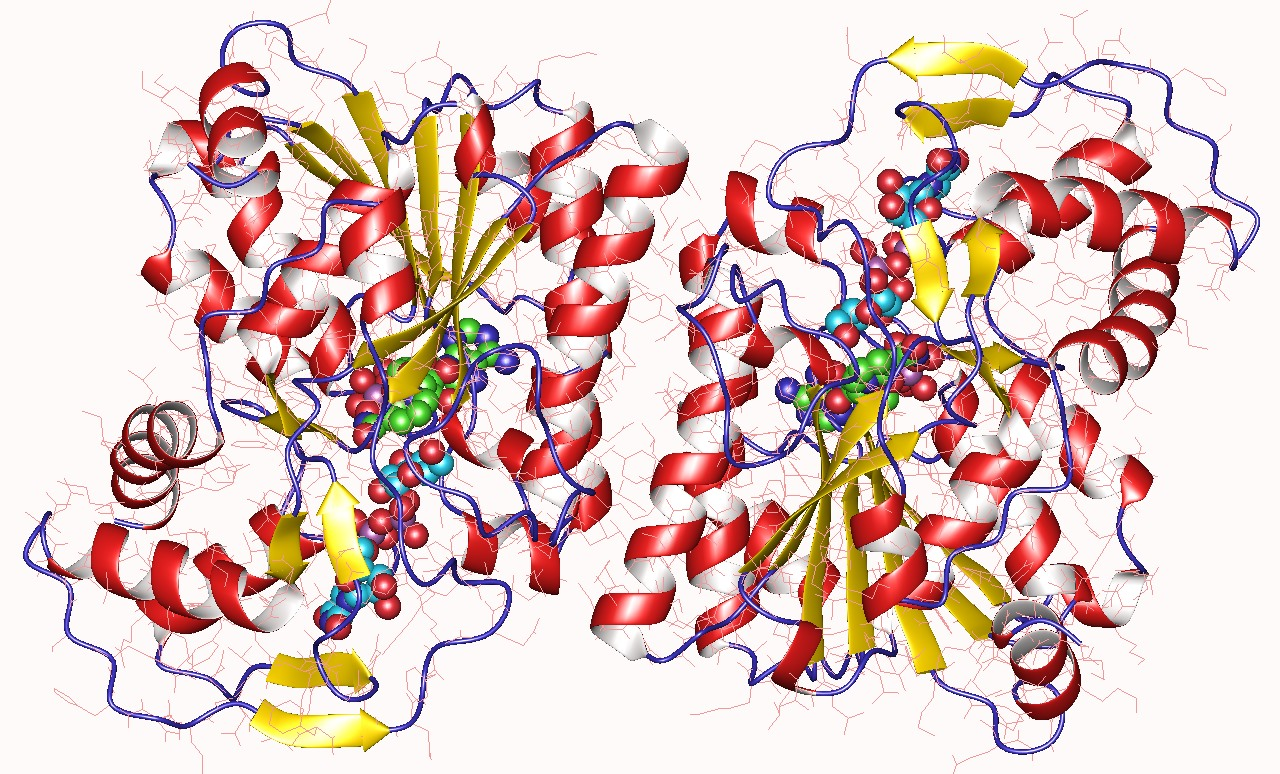
- UDP-N-acetylglucosamine 4-epimerase homodimer, Pseudomonas aeruginosa

Identifiers
- EC no.: 5.1.3.7
- CAS no.: 9024-16-2

Databases
- IntEnz: IntEnz view
- BRENDA: BRENDA entry
- ExPASy: NiceZyme view
- KEGG: KEGG entry
- MetaCyc: metabolic pathway
- PRIAM: profile
- PDB structures: RCSB PDB PDBe PDBsum
- Gene Ontology: AmiGO / QuickGO
Search
- PMC: articles
- PubMed: articles
- NCBI: proteins

In enzymology, an UDP-N-acetylglucosamine 4-epimerase (EC 5.1.3.7) is an enzyme that catalyzes the chemical reaction

UDP-N-acetyl-D-glucosamine $\rightleftharpoons$ UDP-N-acetyl-D-galactosamine

Hence, this enzyme has one substrate, UDP-N-acetyl-D-glucosamine, and one product, UDP-N-acetyl-D-galactosamine.

This enzyme belongs to the family of isomerases, specifically those racemases and epimerases acting on carbohydrates and derivatives. The systematic name of this enzyme class is UDP-N-acetyl-D-glucosamine 4-epimerase. Other names in common use include UDP acetylglucosamine epimerase, uridine diphosphoacetylglucosamine epimerase, uridine diphosphate N-acetylglucosamine-4-epimerase, and uridine 5'-diphospho-N-acetylglucosamine-4-epimerase. This enzyme participates in aminosugars metabolism.

== Structural studies ==
As of late 2007, two structures have been solved for this class of enzymes, with PDB accession codes 1SB8 and 1SB9.
