= N-acylglucosamine-6-phosphate 2-epimerase =

Identifiers
- EC no.: 5.1.3.9
- CAS no.: 37318-35-7

Databases
- IntEnz: IntEnz view
- BRENDA: BRENDA entry
- ExPASy: NiceZyme view
- KEGG: KEGG entry
- MetaCyc: metabolic pathway
- PRIAM: profile
- PDB structures: RCSB PDB PDBe PDBsum
- Gene Ontology: AmiGO / QuickGO
Search
- PMC: articles
- PubMed: articles
- NCBI: proteins

In enzymology, a N-acylglucosamine-6-phosphate 2-epimerase (EC 5.1.3.9) is an enzyme that catalyzes the chemical reaction

N-acyl-D-glucosamine 6-phosphate $\rightleftharpoons$ N-acyl-D-mannosamine 6-phosphate

Hence, this enzyme has one substrate, N-acyl-D-glucosamine 6-phosphate, and one product, N-acyl-D-mannosamine 6-phosphate.

This enzyme belongs to the family of isomerases, specifically those racemases and epimerases acting on carbohydrates and derivatives. The systematic name of this enzyme class is N-acyl-D-glucosamine-6-phosphate 2-epimerase. Other names in common use include acylglucosamine-6-phosphate 2-epimerase, and acylglucosamine phosphate 2-epimerase. This enzyme participates in aminosugars metabolism.

== Structural studies ==
As of late 2007, two structures have been solved for this class of enzymes, with PDB accession codes 1Y0E and 1YXY.
