= UDP-glucuronate 4-epimerase =

Class of enzymes

Identifiers
- EC no.: 5.1.3.6
- CAS no.: 9024-17-3

Databases
- IntEnz: IntEnz view
- BRENDA: BRENDA entry
- ExPASy: NiceZyme view
- KEGG: KEGG entry
- MetaCyc: metabolic pathway
- PRIAM: profile
- PDB structures: RCSB PDB PDBe PDBsum
- Gene Ontology: AmiGO / QuickGO
Search
- PMC: articles
- PubMed: articles
- NCBI: proteins

In enzymology, an UDP-glucuronate 4-epimerase (EC 5.1.3.6) is an enzyme that catalyzes the chemical reaction

UDP-glucuronate $\rightleftharpoons$ UDP-D-galacturonate

Hence, this enzyme has one substrate, UDP-glucuronate, and one product, UDP-D-galacturonate.

This enzyme belongs to the family of isomerases, specifically those racemases and epimerases acting on carbohydrates and derivatives. The systematic name of this enzyme class is UDP-glucuronate 4-epimerase. Other names in common use include uridine diphospho-D-galacturonic acid, UDP glucuronic epimerase, uridine diphosphoglucuronic epimerase, UDP-galacturonate 4-epimerase, uridine diphosphoglucuronate epimerase, and UDP-D-galacturonic acid 4-epimerase. This enzyme participates in starch and sucrose metabolism and nucleotide sugars metabolism.
