= Acetoin racemase =

Class of enzymes

acetoin racemase

Identifiers
- EC no.: 5.1.2.4
- CAS no.: 37318-32-4

Databases
- IntEnz: IntEnz view
- BRENDA: BRENDA entry
- ExPASy: NiceZyme view
- KEGG: KEGG entry
- MetaCyc: metabolic pathway
- PRIAM: profile
- PDB structures: RCSB PDB PDBe PDBsum
- Gene Ontology: AmiGO / QuickGO
Search
- PMC: articles
- PubMed: articles
- NCBI: proteins

In enzymology, an acetoin racemase (EC 5.1.2.4) is an enzyme that catalyzes the chemical reaction

(S)-acetoin $\rightleftharpoons$ (R)-acetoin

This enzyme belongs to the family of isomerases, specifically those racemases and epimerases acting on hydroxy acids and derivatives. The systematic name of this enzyme class is acetoin racemase. This enzyme is also called acetylmethylcarbinol racemase. This enzyme participates in butanoate metabolism.
