= Aldose 1-epimerase =

Enzyme involved in glucose metabolism

aldose 1-epimerase

Identifiers
- EC no.: 5.1.3.3
- CAS no.: 9031-76-9

Databases
- IntEnz: IntEnz view
- BRENDA: BRENDA entry
- ExPASy: NiceZyme view
- KEGG: KEGG entry
- MetaCyc: metabolic pathway
- PRIAM: profile
- PDB structures: RCSB PDB PDBe PDBsum
- Gene Ontology: AmiGO / QuickGO
Search
- PMC: articles
- PubMed: articles
- NCBI: proteins

In enzymology, an aldose 1-epimerase (EC 5.1.3.3) is an enzyme that catalyzes the chemical reaction

alpha-D-glucose $\rightleftharpoons$ beta-D-glucose

Hence, this enzyme has one substrate, alpha-D-glucose, and one product, beta-D-glucose.

This enzyme belongs to the family of isomerases, specifically those racemases and epimerases acting on carbohydrates and derivatives. The systematic name of this enzyme class is aldose 1-epimerase. Other names in common use include mutarotase, and aldose mutarotase. This enzyme participates in glycolysis and gluconeogenesis.

== Structural studies ==
As of late 2007, 23 structures have been solved for this class of enzymes, with PDB accession codes 1L7J, 1L7K, 1LUR, 1MMU, 1MMX, 1MMY, 1MMZ, 1MN0, 1NS0, 1NS2, 1NS4, 1NS7, 1NS8, 1NSM, 1NSR, 1NSS, 1NSU, 1NSV, 1NSX, 1NSZ, 1SNZ, 1SO0, and 1YGA.
