= UDP-glucosamine 4-epimerase =

Class of enzymes

Identifiers
- EC no.: 5.1.3.16

Databases
- IntEnz: IntEnz view
- BRENDA: BRENDA entry
- ExPASy: NiceZyme view
- KEGG: KEGG entry
- MetaCyc: metabolic pathway
- PRIAM: profile
- PDB structures: RCSB PDB PDBe PDBsum
- Gene Ontology: AmiGO / QuickGO
Search
- PMC: articles
- PubMed: articles
- NCBI: proteins

In enzymology, an UDP-glucosamine 4-epimerase (EC 5.1.3.16) is an enzyme that catalyzes the chemical reaction

UDP-glucosamine $\rightleftharpoons$ UDP-galactosamine

Hence, this enzyme has one substrate, UDP-glucosamine, and one product, UDP-galactosamine.

This enzyme belongs to the family of isomerases, specifically those racemases and epimerases acting on carbohydrates and derivatives. The systematic name of this enzyme class is UDP-glucosamine 4-epimerase.
