= Isocitrate epimerase =

Identifiers
- EC no.: 5.1.2.6
- CAS no.: 81210-68-6

Databases
- IntEnz: IntEnz view
- BRENDA: BRENDA entry
- ExPASy: NiceZyme view
- KEGG: KEGG entry
- MetaCyc: metabolic pathway
- PRIAM: profile
- PDB structures: RCSB PDB PDBe PDBsum
- Gene Ontology: AmiGO / QuickGO
Search
- PMC: articles
- PubMed: articles
- NCBI: proteins

In enzymology, an isocitrate epimerase is classified as follows: EC 5.1.2.6. This number indicates that it is an isomerase, specifically a racemase or epimerase that acts on hydroxy acids and their derivatives, namely isocitrate. Isocitrate epimerase specifically catalyzes the reversible reaction:

(1R,2S)-1-hydroxypropane-1,2,3-tricarboxylate ↔ (1S,2S)-1-hydroxypropane-1,2,3-tricarboxylate

which can also be described as

D-threo-isocitrate ↔ D-erythro-isocitrate

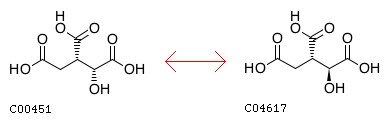

== History ==
Isocitrate epimerase was originally isolated from the fungal cell-free extract of Penicillium purpurogenum , where it was discovered due to the excess accumulation of L-alloisocitric acid (D-erythro-isocitrate)—a diastereomer of isocitrate previously not seen in nature. In order to accumulate L-alloisocitric acid as a fermentation product, P. purpurogenum needed to be grown on citrate supplemented nutrient agar. During this fermentation it was found that the fermentation yield of L-alloisocitric acid was capable of “exceeding 70% without producing any other stereoisomers of isocitiric acid or other metabolites”.

This enzyme has not been heavily studied since first being identified in 1982, as a result of this there is presently not a crystal structure or active site description for isocitrate epimerase. Other isocitrate enzymes, such as isocitrate lyase and isocitrate dehydrogenase have been studied more closely due to their key roles in glycolysis and the TCA cycle.
