= Chondroitin-glucuronate 5-epimerase =

Enzyme

chondroitin-glucuronate 5-epimerase

Identifiers
- EC no.: 5.1.3.19
- CAS no.: 86417-91-6

Databases
- IntEnz: IntEnz view
- BRENDA: BRENDA entry
- ExPASy: NiceZyme view
- KEGG: KEGG entry
- MetaCyc: metabolic pathway
- PRIAM: profile
- PDB structures: RCSB PDB PDBe PDBsum
- Gene Ontology: AmiGO / QuickGO
Search
- PMC: articles
- PubMed: articles
- NCBI: proteins

In enzymology, a chondroitin-glucuronate 5-epimerase (EC 5.1.3.19) is an enzyme that catalyzes the chemical reaction

chondroitin D-glucuronate $\rightleftharpoons$ dermatan L-iduronate

Hence, this enzyme has one substrate, chondroitin D-glucuronate, and one product, dermatan L-iduronate.

This enzyme belongs to the family of isomerases, specifically those racemases and epimerases acting on carbohydrates and derivatives. The systematic name of this enzyme class is chondroitin-D-glucuronate 5-epimerase. Other names in common use include polyglucuronate 5-epimerase, dermatan-sulfate 5-epimerase, urunosyl C-5 epimerase, and chondroitin D-glucuronosyl 5-epimerase. This enzyme participates in chondroitin sulfate biosynthesis.
