= Tartrate epimerase =

Class of enzymes

tartrate epimerase

Identifiers
- EC no.: 5.1.2.5
- CAS no.: 37318-33-5

Databases
- IntEnz: IntEnz view
- BRENDA: BRENDA entry
- ExPASy: NiceZyme view
- KEGG: KEGG entry
- MetaCyc: metabolic pathway
- PRIAM: profile
- PDB structures: RCSB PDB PDBe PDBsum
- Gene Ontology: AmiGO / QuickGO
Search
- PMC: articles
- PubMed: articles
- NCBI: proteins

In enzymology, a tartrate epimerase (EC 5.1.2.5) is an enzyme that catalyzes the chemical reaction

(R,R)-tartrate $\rightleftharpoons$ meso-tartrate

Hence, this enzyme has one substrate, (R,R)-tartrate, and one product, meso-tartrate.

This enzyme belongs to the family of isomerases, specifically those racemases and epimerases acting on hydroxy acids and derivatives. The systematic name of this enzyme class is tartrate epimerase. This enzyme is also called tartaric racemase. This enzyme participates in glyoxylate and dicarboxylate metabolism.
