= Glutamate 2,3-aminomutase =

Class of enzymes

Glutamate 2,3-aminomutase (EC 5.4.3.9) is an enzyme that belongs to the radical SAM enzymes superfamily. These enzymes facilitate the reductive cleavage of S-adenosylmethionine (SAM) through the use of radical chemistry and an iron–sulfur cluster. This enzyme family is implicated in the biosynthesis of DNA precursors, vitamin, cofactor, antibiotic and herbicides and in biodegradation pathways. In particular, glutamate 2,3 aminomutase is involved in the conversion of L-α-glutamate to L-β-glutamate in Clostridioides difficile. The generalized reaction is shown below:

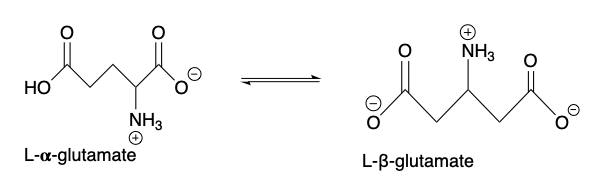

This enzyme is closely related to lysine 2,3-aminomutase (LAM) and is thought to use similar cofactors and has a similar reaction mechanism. Experimental evidence suggests that glutamate 2,3 aminomutase uses a pyridoxal 5-phosphate cofactor to catalyze the reaction shown. The pyridoxal 5-phosphate cofactor (Vitamin B_{6}) is heavily utilized by enzymes that catalyze amino acid transformations.

== Proposed Mechanism ==
By comparing the amino acid sequences of a closely related enzyme to glutamate 2,3-aminomutase, lysine 2,3-aminomutase, researchers were able to identify key catalytic residues in glutamate 2,3-aminomutase that are distinguishing from similar aminomutases. In the case of lysine 2,3-aminomutase, lysine is bound to the enzyme in the active state, whereas glutamate 2,3-aminomutase has glutamate bound in the active state. Both enzymes appear to bind α-carboxylate groups on their respective amino acid substrates in a similar manner using arginine residues at positions 134 (lysine 2,3 aminomutase) and 173 (glutamate 2,3-aminomutase). However, the binding of the amino acid side chains differs because lysine confers basic properties where as glutamate confers acidic properties. The proposed identifying residues of a glutamate 2,3-aminomutase are Lys332 and Asn369 which likely bind the γ–carboxylate group of glutamate. This is the key difference from lysine 2,3-aminomutase because that enzyme uses Asp293 and Asp330 to bind the ε–aminium group of lysine. The proposed differences lead to a unique hydrogen bonding pattern to further distinguish glutamate 2,3-aminomutases from lysine 2,3-aminomutases which is shown here:

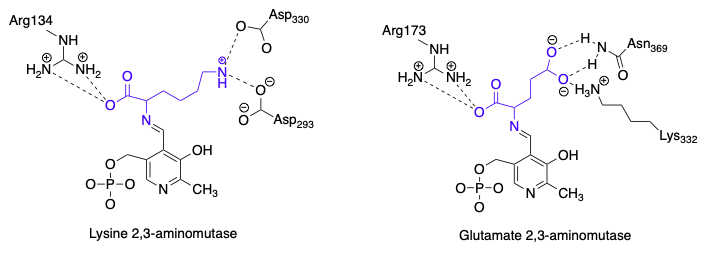

Based on high performance liquid chromatography (HPLC) and electron paramagnetic resonance (EPR) spectroscopy techniques, the subsequent proposed glutamate 2,3-aminomutase reaction scheme is shown below:

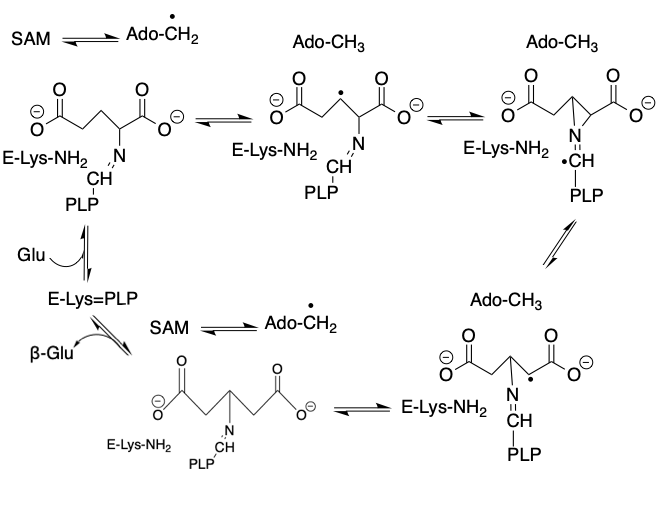

1. Starting from left-center, transaldimination occurs using L-glutamate to generate an external aldimine of PLP. This frees the active site lysine.
2. S-adenosylmethionine is reversibly cleaved to the 5'-deoxyadenosyl radical through interactions with the enzyme's iron–sulfur cluster.
3. A radical forms along with 5'-deoxyadenosyl, which remains bound to the active site.
4. Isomerization of the original radical to a second and subsequent third form of the radial occurs.
5. The third radical is β-glutamate-related and is able to abstract a hydrogen atom from 5'-deoxyadenosine.
6. The aldimine of PLP and β-glutamate undergoes another transaldimation with the free active site lysine, and releases β-glutamate and regenerates the initial PLP form to allow for another catalytic cycle.
