= Methionine racemase =

methionine racemase

Identifiers
- EC no.: 5.1.1.2
- CAS no.: 9024-07-1

Databases
- IntEnz: IntEnz view
- BRENDA: BRENDA entry
- ExPASy: NiceZyme view
- KEGG: KEGG entry
- MetaCyc: metabolic pathway
- PRIAM: profile
- PDB structures: RCSB PDB PDBe PDBsum
- Gene Ontology: AmiGO / QuickGO
Search
- PMC: articles
- PubMed: articles
- NCBI: proteins

In enzymology, a methionine racemase (EC 5.1.1.2) is an enzyme that catalyzes the chemical reaction

L-methionine $\rightleftharpoons$ D-methionine

Hence, this enzyme has one substrate, L-methionine, and one product, D-methionine.

This enzyme belongs to the family of isomerases, specifically those racemases and epimerases acting on amino acids and derivatives. The systematic name of this enzyme class is methionine racemase. It employs one cofactor, pyridoxal phosphate.
