= Protein-serine epimerase =

protein-serine epimerase

Identifiers
- EC no.: 5.1.1.16
- CAS no.: 169592-52-3

Databases
- IntEnz: IntEnz view
- BRENDA: BRENDA entry
- ExPASy: NiceZyme view
- KEGG: KEGG entry
- MetaCyc: metabolic pathway
- PRIAM: profile
- PDB structures: RCSB PDB PDBe PDBsum
- Gene Ontology: AmiGO / QuickGO
Search
- PMC: articles
- PubMed: articles
- NCBI: proteins

In enzymology, a protein-serine epimerase (EC 5.1.1.16) is an enzyme that catalyzes the chemical reaction

[protein]-L-serine $\rightleftharpoons$ [protein]-D-serine

Hence, this enzyme has one substrate, [protein]-L-serine, and one product, [protein]-D-serine.

This enzyme belongs to the family of isomerases, specifically those racemases and epimerases acting on amino acids and derivatives. The systematic name of this enzyme class is [protein]-serine epimerase. This enzyme is also called protein-serine racemase.

== Structural studies ==
As of late 2007, only one structure has been solved for this class of enzymes, with the PDB accession code 1WTC.
