= Allantoin racemase =

allantoin racemase

Identifiers
- EC no.: 5.1.99.3
- CAS no.: 56214-40-5

Databases
- IntEnz: IntEnz view
- BRENDA: BRENDA entry
- ExPASy: NiceZyme view
- KEGG: KEGG entry
- MetaCyc: metabolic pathway
- PRIAM: profile
- PDB structures: RCSB PDB PDBe PDBsum
- Gene Ontology: AmiGO / QuickGO
Search
- PMC: articles
- PubMed: articles
- NCBI: proteins

In enzymology, an allantoin racemase (EC 5.1.99.3) is an enzyme that catalyzes the chemical reaction

(S)(+)-allantoin $\rightleftharpoons$ (R)(−)-allantoin

Hence, this enzyme has one substrate, (S)(+)-allantoin, and one product, (R)(−)-allantoin.

This enzyme belongs to the family of isomerases, specifically those racemases and epimerases acting on other compounds. The systematic name of this enzyme class is allantoin racemase. This enzyme participates in purine metabolism.
