= Glucose-6-phosphate 1-epimerase =

glucose-6-phosphate 1-epimerase

Identifiers
- EC no.: 5.1.3.15
- CAS no.: 37259-65-7

Databases
- IntEnz: IntEnz view
- BRENDA: BRENDA entry
- ExPASy: NiceZyme view
- KEGG: KEGG entry
- MetaCyc: metabolic pathway
- PRIAM: profile
- PDB structures: RCSB PDB PDBe PDBsum
- Gene Ontology: AmiGO / QuickGO
Search
- PMC: articles
- PubMed: articles
- NCBI: proteins

In enzymology, a glucose-6-phosphate 1-epimerase (EC 5.1.3.15) is an enzyme that catalyzes the chemical reaction

alpha-D-glucose 6-phosphate $\rightleftharpoons$ beta-D-glucose 6-phosphate

Hence, this enzyme has one substrate, alpha-D-glucose 6-phosphate, and one product, beta-D-glucose 6-phosphate.

This enzyme belongs to the family of isomerases, specifically those racemases and epimerases acting on carbohydrates and derivatives. The systematic name of this enzyme class is D-glucose-6-phosphate 1-epimerase. This enzyme participates in glycolysis / gluconeogenesis.

== Structural studies ==
As of late 2013, 3 structures have been solved for this class of enzymes, with PDB accession codes 2CIQ, 2CIR, and 2CIS.
