= Pseudouridylate synthase =

pseudouridylate synthase

Identifiers
- EC no.: 4.2.1.70
- CAS no.: 9023-35-2

Databases
- IntEnz: IntEnz view
- BRENDA: BRENDA entry
- ExPASy: NiceZyme view
- KEGG: KEGG entry
- MetaCyc: metabolic pathway
- PRIAM: profile
- PDB structures: RCSB PDB PDBe PDBsum
- Gene Ontology: AmiGO / QuickGO
Search
- PMC: articles
- PubMed: articles
- NCBI: proteins

The enzyme pseudouridylate synthase (EC 4.2.1.70) catalyzes the chemical reaction

uracil + D-ribose 5-phosphate $\rightleftharpoons$ pseudouridine 5′-phosphate + H_{2}O

This enzyme belongs to the family of lyases, specifically the hydro-lyases, which cleave carbon-oxygen bonds. The systematic name of this enzyme class is uracil hydro-lyase (adding D-ribose 5-phosphate pseudouridine-5′-phosphate-forming). Other names in common use include pseudouridylic acid synthetase, pseudouridine monophosphate synthetase, 5-ribosyluracil 5-phosphate synthetase, pseudouridylate synthetase, upsilonUMP synthetase, and uracil hydro-lyase (adding D-ribose 5-phosphate). This enzyme participates in pyrimidine metabolism.

== Structural studies ==
As of late 2007, 22 structures have been solved for this class of enzymes, with PDB accession codes 1DJ0, 1K8W, 1KSK, 1KSL, 1KSV, 1PRZ, 1QYU, 1R3E, 1R3F, 1SB7, 1SGV, 1SI7, 1SZW, 1V9F, 1V9K, 1VIO, 1XPI, 1Z2Z, 1ZE1, 1ZE2, 1ZL3, and 2I82.
