= 1-(5-phosphoribosyl)-5-((5-phosphoribosylamino)methylideneamino)imidazole-4-carboxamide isomerase =

Class of enzymes

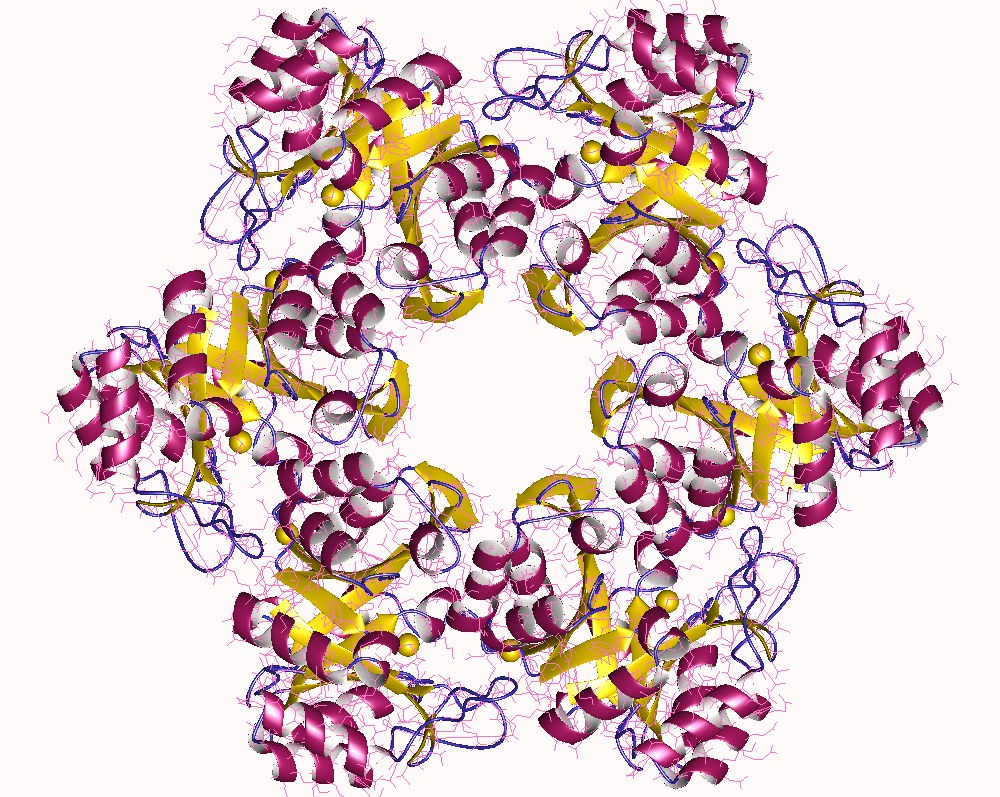
- HisAp hexamer, Arthrobacter aurescens

Identifiers
- EC no.: 5.3.1.16
- CAS no.: 37318-43-7

Databases
- IntEnz: IntEnz view
- BRENDA: BRENDA entry
- ExPASy: NiceZyme view
- KEGG: KEGG entry
- MetaCyc: metabolic pathway
- PRIAM: profile
- PDB structures: RCSB PDB PDBe PDBsum
Search
- PMC: articles
- PubMed: articles
- NCBI: proteins

1-(5-phosphoribosyl)-5-((5-phosphoribosylamino)methylideneamino)imidazole-4-carboxamide isomerase (EC 5.3.1.16, N-(5-phospho-D-ribosylformimino)-5-amino-1-(5-phosphoribosyl)-4-imidazolecarboxamide isomerase, phosphoribosylformiminoaminophosphoribosylimidazolecarboxamide isomerase, N-(phosphoribosylformimino) aminophosphoribosylimidazolecarboxamide isomerase, 1-(5-phosphoribosyl)-5-[(5-phosphoribosylamino)methylideneamino]imidazole-4-carboxamide ketol-isomerase) is an enzyme with systematic name 1-(5-phosphoribosyl)-5-((5-phosphoribosylamino)methylideneamino)imidazole-4-carboxamide aldose-ketose-isomerase. This enzyme catalyses the following chemical reaction

1-(5-phosphoribosyl)-5-[(5-phosphoribosylamino)methylideneamino]imidazole-4-carboxamide $\rightleftharpoons$ 5-[(5-phospho-1-deoxyribulos-1-ylamino)methylideneamino]-1-(5-phosphoribosyl)imidazole-4-carboxamide
