= 4-carboxymethyl-4-methylbutenolide mutase =

Class of enzymes

Identifiers
- EC no.: 5.4.99.14

Databases
- IntEnz: IntEnz view
- BRENDA: BRENDA entry
- ExPASy: NiceZyme view
- KEGG: KEGG entry
- MetaCyc: metabolic pathway
- PRIAM: profile
- PDB structures: RCSB PDB PDBe PDBsum
- Gene Ontology: AmiGO / QuickGO
Search
- PMC: articles
- PubMed: articles
- NCBI: proteins

In enzymology, a 4-carboxymethyl-4-methylbutenolide mutase (EC 5.4.99.14) is an enzyme that catalyzes the chemical reaction

4-carboxymethyl-4-methylbut-2-en-1,4-olide $\rightleftharpoons$ 4-carboxymethyl-3-methylbut-2-en-1,4-olide

Hence, this enzyme has one substrate, 4-carboxymethyl-4-methylbut-2-en-1,4-olide, and one product, 4-carboxymethyl-3-methylbut-2-en-1,4-olide.

This enzyme belongs to the family of isomerases, specifically those intramolecular transferases transferring other groups. The systematic name of this enzyme class is 4-carboxymethyl-4-methylbut-2-en-1,4-olide methylmutase. Other names in common use include 4-methyl-2-enelactone isomerase, 4-methylmuconolactone methylisomerase, and 4-methyl-3-enelactone methyl isomerase.
