= D-ornithine 4,5-aminomutase =

Identifiers
- EC no.: 5.4.3.5
- CAS no.: 62213-30-3

Databases
- IntEnz: IntEnz view
- BRENDA: BRENDA entry
- ExPASy: NiceZyme view
- KEGG: KEGG entry
- MetaCyc: metabolic pathway
- PRIAM: profile
- PDB structures: RCSB PDB PDBe PDBsum
- Gene Ontology: AmiGO / QuickGO
Search
- PMC: articles
- PubMed: articles
- NCBI: proteins

In enzymology, a D-ornithine 4,5-aminomutase (EC 5.4.3.5) is an enzyme that catalyzes the chemical reaction

D-ornithine $\rightleftharpoons$ (2R,4S)-2,4-diaminopentanoate

Hence, this enzyme has one substrate, D-ornithine, and one product, (2R,4S)-2,4-diaminopentanoate.

This enzyme belongs to the family of isomerases, specifically those intramolecular transferases transferring amino groups. The systematic name of this enzyme class is D-ornithine 4,5-aminomutase. Other names in common use include D-alpha-ornithine 5,4-aminomutase, and D-ornithine aminomutase. This enzyme participates in d-arginine and d-ornithine metabolism. It has 3 cofactors: pyridoxal phosphate, Cobamide coenzyme, and Dithiothreitol.
