= 5-carboxymethyl-2-hydroxymuconate Delta-isomerase =

InterPro Family

5-carboxymethyl-2-hydroxymuconate delta-isomerase

Identifiers
- EC no.: 5.3.3.10
- CAS no.: 79079-05-3

Databases
- IntEnz: IntEnz view
- BRENDA: BRENDA entry
- ExPASy: NiceZyme view
- KEGG: KEGG entry
- MetaCyc: metabolic pathway
- PRIAM: profile
- PDB structures: RCSB PDB PDBe PDBsum
- Gene Ontology: AmiGO / QuickGO
Search
- PMC: articles
- PubMed: articles
- NCBI: proteins

In enzymology, a 5-carboxymethyl-2-hydroxymuconate Delta-isomerase (EC 5.3.3.10) is an enzyme that catalyzes the chemical reaction

5-carboxymethyl-2-hydroxymuconate $\rightleftharpoons$ 5-carboxy-2-oxohept-3-enedioate

Hence, this enzyme has one substrate, 5-carboxymethyl-2-hydroxymuconate, and one product, 5-carboxy-2-oxohept-3-enedioate.

This enzyme belongs to the family of isomerases, specifically those intramolecular oxidoreductases transposing C=C bonds. The systematic name of this enzyme class is 5-carboxymethyl-2-hydroxymuconate Delta2,Delta4-2-oxo,Delta3-isomerase. This enzyme participates in tyrosine metabolism and benzoate degradation via hydroxylation.

== Structural studies ==
As of late 2007, 4 structures have been solved for this class of enzymes, with PDB accession codes 1GTT, 1I7O, 1WZO, and 2DFU.
