= Arabinose isomerase =

arabinose isomerase

Identifiers
- EC no.: 5.3.1.3
- CAS no.: 9023-81-8

Databases
- IntEnz: IntEnz view
- BRENDA: BRENDA entry
- ExPASy: NiceZyme view
- KEGG: KEGG entry
- MetaCyc: metabolic pathway
- PRIAM: profile
- PDB structures: RCSB PDB PDBe PDBsum
- Gene Ontology: AmiGO / QuickGO
Search
- PMC: articles
- PubMed: articles
- NCBI: proteins

In enzymology, an arabinose isomerase (EC 5.3.1.3) is an enzyme that catalyzes the chemical reaction

D-arabinose $\rightleftharpoons$ D-ribulose

Hence, this enzyme has one substrate, D-arabinose, and one product, D-ribulose.

This enzyme belongs to the family of isomerases, specifically those intramolecular oxidoreductases interconverting aldoses and ketoses. The systematic name of this enzyme class is D-arabinose aldose-ketose-isomerase. Other names in common use include D-arabinose(L-fucose) isomerase, D-arabinose isomerase, L-fucose isomerase, and D-arabinose ketol-isomerase.

== Structural studies ==
As of late 2007, only one structure has been solved for this class of enzymes, with the PDB accession code 1FUI.
