= TRNA pseudouridine65 synthase =

tRNA pseudouridine^{65} synthase

Identifiers
- EC no.: 5.4.99.26
- CAS no.: 430429-15-5

Databases
- IntEnz: IntEnz view
- BRENDA: BRENDA entry
- ExPASy: NiceZyme view
- KEGG: KEGG entry
- MetaCyc: metabolic pathway
- PRIAM: profile
- PDB structures: RCSB PDB PDBe PDBsum
Search
- PMC: articles
- PubMed: articles
- NCBI: proteins

tRNA pseudouridine^{65} synthase (EC 5.4.99.26, TruC, YqcB) is an enzyme with systematic name tRNA-uridine^{65} uracil mutase. This enzyme catalyses the following chemical reaction

tRNA uridine^{65} $\rightleftharpoons$ tRNA pseudouridine^{65}

TruC specifically modifies uridines at positions 65 in tRNA.
