= Muconolactone Δ-isomerase =

Class of enzymes

Identifiers
- EC no.: 5.3.3.4
- CAS no.: 37318-46-0

Databases
- IntEnz: IntEnz view
- BRENDA: BRENDA entry
- ExPASy: NiceZyme view
- KEGG: KEGG entry
- MetaCyc: metabolic pathway
- PRIAM: profile
- PDB structures: RCSB PDB PDBe PDBsum
- Gene Ontology: AmiGO / QuickGO
Search
- PMC: articles
- PubMed: articles
- NCBI: proteins

In enzymology, a muconolactone Δ-isomerase (EC 5.3.3.4) is an enzyme that catalyzes the chemical reaction

(S)-5-oxo-2,5-dihydrofuran-2-acetate $\rightleftharpoons$ 5-oxo-4,5-dihydrofuran-2-acetate

Hence, this enzyme has one substrate, (S)-5-oxo-2,5-dihydrofuran-2-acetate, and one product, 5-oxo-4,5-dihydrofuran-2-acetate.

This enzyme belongs to the family of isomerases, specifically those intramolecular oxidoreductases transposing C=C bonds. The systematic name of this enzyme class is 5-oxo-4,5-dihydrofuran-2-acetate Delta3-Delta2-isomerase. This enzyme is also called muconolactone isomerase. This enzyme participates in benzoate degradation via hydroxylation.

== Structural studies ==
As of late 2007, only one structure has been solved for this class of enzymes, with the PDB accession code 1MLI.
