= Polyenoic fatty acid isomerase =

Identifiers
- EC no.: 5.3.3.13

Databases
- IntEnz: IntEnz view
- BRENDA: BRENDA entry
- ExPASy: NiceZyme view
- KEGG: KEGG entry
- MetaCyc: metabolic pathway
- PRIAM: profile
- PDB structures: RCSB PDB PDBe PDBsum
Search
- PMC: articles
- PubMed: articles
- NCBI: proteins

In enzymology, a polyenoic fatty acid isomerase (EC 5.3.3.13) is an enzyme that catalyzes the chemical reaction

(5Z,8Z,11Z,14Z,17Z)-icosapentaenoate $\rightleftharpoons$ (5Z,7E,9E,14Z,17Z)-icosapentaenoate

Hence, this enzyme has one substrate, (5Z,8Z,11Z,14Z,17Z)-icosapentaenoate, and one product, (5Z,7E,9E,14Z,17Z)-icosapentaenoate.

This enzyme belongs to the family of isomerases, specifically those intramolecular oxidoreductases transposing C=C bonds. The systematic name of this enzyme class is (5Z,8Z,11Z,14Z,17Z)-icosapentaenoate Delta8,11-Delta7,9-isomerase (trans-double-bond-forming). Other names in common use include PFI, eicosapentaenoate cis-Delta5,8,11,14,17-eicosapentaenoate, cis-Delta5-trans-Delta7,9-cis-Delta14,17 isomerase, (5Z,8Z,11Z,14Z,17Z)-eicosapentaenoate Delta8,11-Delta7,8-isomerase, (incorrect), (5Z,8Z,11Z,14Z,17Z)-eicosapentaenoate Delta8,11-Delta7,9-isomerase, and (trans-double-bond-forming).
