= Arabinose-5-phosphate isomerase =

arabinose-5-phosphate isomerase

Identifiers
- EC no.: 5.3.1.13
- CAS no.: 9023-86-3

Databases
- IntEnz: IntEnz view
- BRENDA: BRENDA entry
- ExPASy: NiceZyme view
- KEGG: KEGG entry
- MetaCyc: metabolic pathway
- PRIAM: profile
- PDB structures: RCSB PDB PDBe PDBsum
- Gene Ontology: AmiGO / QuickGO
Search
- PMC: articles
- PubMed: articles
- NCBI: proteins

In enzymology, an arabinose-5-phosphate isomerase (EC 5.3.1.13) is an enzyme that catalyzes the chemical reaction

D-arabinose 5-phosphate $\rightleftharpoons$ D-ribulose 5-phosphate

Hence, this enzyme has one substrate, D-arabinose 5-phosphate, and one product, D-ribulose 5-phosphate.

This enzyme belongs to the family of isomerases, specifically those intramolecular oxidoreductases interconverting aldoses and ketoses. The systematic name of this enzyme class is D-arabinose-5-phosphate aldose-ketose-isomerase. Other names in common use include arabinose phosphate isomerase, phosphoarabinoisomerase, and D-arabinose-5-phosphate ketol-isomerase.
