= L-rhamnose isomerase =

Identifiers
- EC no.: 5.3.1.14
- CAS no.: 9023-84-1

Databases
- IntEnz: IntEnz view
- BRENDA: BRENDA entry
- ExPASy: NiceZyme view
- KEGG: KEGG entry
- MetaCyc: metabolic pathway
- PRIAM: profile
- PDB structures: RCSB PDB PDBe PDBsum
- Gene Ontology: AmiGO / QuickGO
Search
- PMC: articles
- PubMed: articles
- NCBI: proteins

In enzymology, a L-rhamnose isomerase (EC 5.3.1.14) is an enzyme that catalyzes the chemical reaction

L-rhamnose $\rightleftharpoons$ L-rhamnulose

Hence, this enzyme has one substrate, L-rhamnose, and one product, L-rhamnulose.

This enzyme belongs to the family of isomerases, specifically those intramolecular oxidoreductases interconverting aldoses and ketoses. The systematic name of this enzyme class is L-rhamnose aldose-ketose-isomerase. Other names in common use include rhamnose isomerase, and L-rhamnose ketol-isomerase. This enzyme participates in fructose and mannose metabolism.

== Structural studies ==
As of late 2007, 6 structures have been solved for this class of enzymes, with PDB accession codes 1D8W, 1DE5, 1DE6, 2HCV, 2I56, and 2I57.
