= Mannose isomerase =

mannose isomerase

Identifiers
- EC no.: 5.3.1.7
- CAS no.: 9031-25-8

Databases
- IntEnz: IntEnz view
- BRENDA: BRENDA entry
- ExPASy: NiceZyme view
- KEGG: KEGG entry
- MetaCyc: metabolic pathway
- PRIAM: profile
- PDB structures: RCSB PDB PDBe PDBsum
- Gene Ontology: AmiGO / QuickGO
Search
- PMC: articles
- PubMed: articles
- NCBI: proteins

In enzymology, a mannose isomerase (EC 5.3.1.7) is an enzyme that catalyzes the chemical reaction

D-mannose $\rightleftharpoons$ D-fructose

Hence, this enzyme has one substrate, D-mannose, and one product, D-fructose.

This enzyme belongs to the family of isomerases, specifically those intramolecular oxidoreductases interconverting aldoses and ketoses. The systematic name of this enzyme class is D-mannose aldose-ketose-isomerase. Other names in common use include D-mannose isomerase, and D-mannose ketol-isomerase. This enzyme participates in fructose and mannose metabolism.
