= Galactose-6-phosphate isomerase =

galactose-6-phosphate isomerase

Identifiers
- EC no.: 5.3.1.26
- CAS no.: 39433-98-2

Databases
- IntEnz: IntEnz view
- BRENDA: BRENDA entry
- ExPASy: NiceZyme view
- KEGG: KEGG entry
- MetaCyc: metabolic pathway
- PRIAM: profile
- PDB structures: RCSB PDB PDBe PDBsum
- Gene Ontology: AmiGO / QuickGO
Search
- PMC: articles
- PubMed: articles
- NCBI: proteins

In enzymology, a galactose-6-phosphate isomerase (EC 5.3.1.26) is an enzyme that catalyzes the chemical reaction

D-galactose 6-phosphate $\rightleftharpoons$ D-tagatose 6-phosphate

Hence, this enzyme has one substrate, D-galactose 6-phosphate, and one product, D-tagatose 6-phosphate.

This enzyme belongs to the family of isomerases, specifically those intramolecular oxidoreductases interconverting aldoses and ketoses. The systematic name of this enzyme class is D-galactose-6-phosphate aldose-ketose-isomerase. This enzyme participates in galactose metabolism.
