= Heparosan-N-sulfate-glucuronate 5-epimerase =

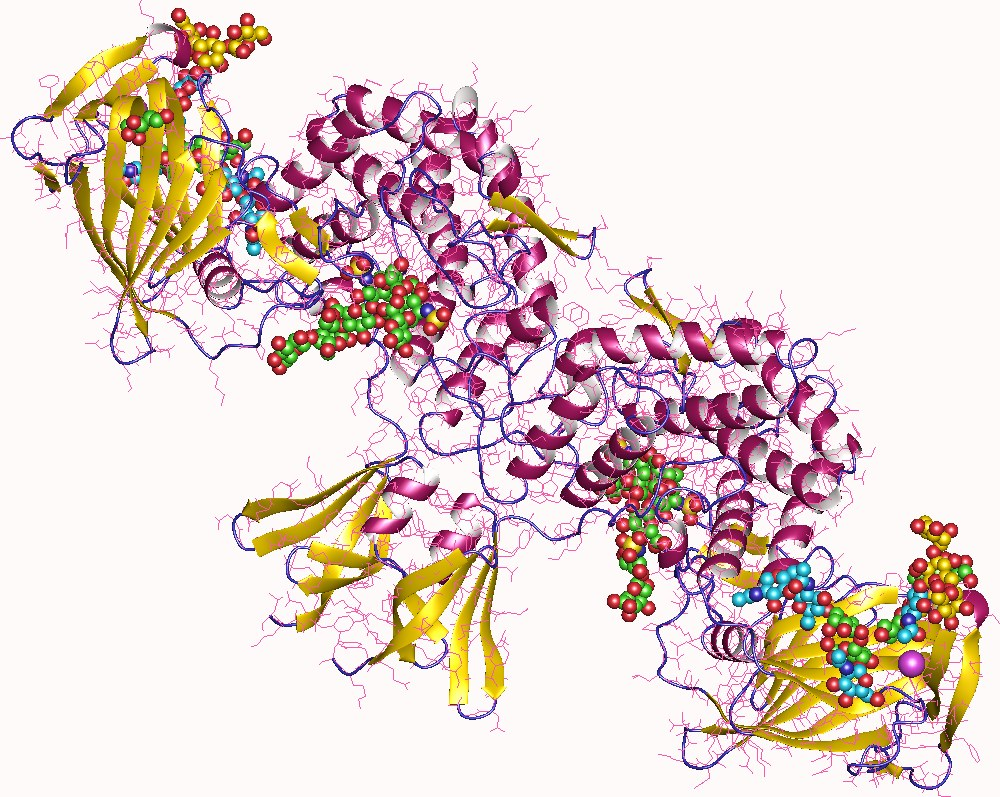

Identifiers
- EC no.: 5.1.3.17
- CAS no.: 112567-86-9

Databases
- IntEnz: IntEnz view
- BRENDA: BRENDA entry
- ExPASy: NiceZyme view
- KEGG: KEGG entry
- MetaCyc: metabolic pathway
- PRIAM: profile
- PDB structures: RCSB PDB PDBe PDBsum
Search
- PMC: articles
- PubMed: articles
- NCBI: proteins

Heparosan-N-sulfate-glucuronate 5-epimerase (EC 5.1.3.17, heparosan epimerase, heparosan-N-sulfate-D-glucuronosyl 5-epimerase, C-5 uronosyl epimerase, polyglucuronate epimerase, D-glucuronyl C-5 epimerase, poly[(1,4)-beta-D-glucuronosyl-(1,4)-N-sulfo-alpha-D-glucosaminyl] glucurono-5-epimerase) is an enzyme with systematic name poly((1->4)-beta-D-glucuronosyl-(1->4)-N-sulfo-alpha-D-glucosaminyl) glucurono-5-epimerase. This enzyme catalyses the following chemical reaction

heparosan-N-sulfate D-glucuronate $\rightleftharpoons$ heparosan-N-sulfate L-iduronate

This enzyme acts on D-glucuronosyl residues adjacent to sulfated D-glucosamine units in the heparin precursor.

== See also ==
- heparan sulfate
