= D-lyxose ketol-isomerase =

Class of enzymes

Identifiers
- EC no.: 5.3.1.15
- CAS no.: 37318-42-6

Databases
- IntEnz: IntEnz view
- BRENDA: BRENDA entry
- ExPASy: NiceZyme view
- KEGG: KEGG entry
- MetaCyc: metabolic pathway
- PRIAM: profile
- PDB structures: RCSB PDB PDBe PDBsum
- Gene Ontology: AmiGO / QuickGO
Search
- PMC: articles
- PubMed: articles
- NCBI: proteins

In enzymology, a D-lyxose ketol-isomerase (EC 5.3.1.15) is an enzyme that catalyzes the chemical reaction

D-lyxose $\rightleftharpoons$ D-xylulose

Hence, this enzyme has one substrate, D-lyxose, and one product, D-xylulose.

This enzyme belongs to the family of isomerases, specifically those intramolecular oxidoreductases interconverting aldoses and ketoses. The systematic name of this enzyme class is D-lyxose aldose-ketose-isomerase. Other names in common use include D-lyxose isomerase, and D-lyxose ketol-isomerase. This enzyme participates in pentose and glucuronate interconversions.

== Structural studies ==
As of late 2007, two structures have been solved for this class of enzymes, with PDB accession codes 1QO2 and 1VZW.
