= Trans-2,3-dihydro-3-hydroxyanthranilate isomerase =

Identifiers
- EC no.: 5.3.3.17

Databases
- IntEnz: IntEnz view
- BRENDA: BRENDA entry
- ExPASy: NiceZyme view
- KEGG: KEGG entry
- MetaCyc: metabolic pathway
- PRIAM: profile
- PDB structures: RCSB PDB PDBe PDBsum
Search
- PMC: articles
- PubMed: articles
- NCBI: proteins

Trans-2,3-dihydro-3-hydroxyanthranilate isomerase (EC 5.3.3.17, phzF (gene)) is an enzyme with systematic name (5S,6S)-6-amino-5-hydroxycyclohexane-1,3-diene-1-carboxyate isomerase. This enzyme catalyses the following chemical reaction

(5S,6S)-6-amino-5-hydroxycyclohexane-1,3-diene-1-carboxyate $\rightleftharpoons$ (1R,6S)-6-amino-5-oxocyclohex-2-ene-1-carboxylate

The enzyme is involved in phenazine biosynthesis.
