= Corticosteroid side-chain-isomerase =

corticosteroid side-chain-isomerase

Identifiers
- EC no.: 5.3.1.21
- CAS no.: 75139-73-0

Databases
- IntEnz: IntEnz view
- BRENDA: BRENDA entry
- ExPASy: NiceZyme view
- KEGG: KEGG entry
- MetaCyc: metabolic pathway
- PRIAM: profile
- PDB structures: RCSB PDB PDBe PDBsum
- Gene Ontology: AmiGO / QuickGO
Search
- PMC: articles
- PubMed: articles
- NCBI: proteins

In enzymology, a corticosteroid side-chain-isomerase (EC 5.3.1.21) is an enzyme that catalyzes the chemical reaction

11-deoxycorticosterone $\rightleftharpoons$ 20-hydroxy-3-oxopregn-4-en-21-al

Hence, this enzyme has one substrate, 11-deoxycorticosterone, and one product, 20-hydroxy-3-oxopregn-4-en-21-al.

This enzyme belongs to the family of isomerases, specifically those intramolecular oxidoreductases interconverting aldoses and ketoses. The systematic name of this enzyme class is 11-deoxycorticosterone aldose-ketose-isomerase.
