= 2-(1,2-epoxy-1,2-dihydrophenyl)acetyl-CoA isomerase =

Class of enzymes

Identifiers
- EC no.: 5.3.3.18

Databases
- IntEnz: IntEnz view
- BRENDA: BRENDA entry
- ExPASy: NiceZyme view
- KEGG: KEGG entry
- MetaCyc: metabolic pathway
- PRIAM: profile
- PDB structures: RCSB PDB PDBe PDBsum
Search
- PMC: articles
- PubMed: articles
- NCBI: proteins

2-(1,2-epoxy-1,2-dihydrophenyl)acetyl-CoA isomerase (EC 5.3.3.18, paaG (gene), 1,2-epoxyphenylacetyl-CoA isomerase) is an enzyme with systematic name 2-(1,2-epoxy-1,2-dihydrophenyl)acetyl-CoA isomerase. This enzyme catalyses the following chemical reaction

2-(1,2-epoxy-1,2-dihydrophenyl)acetyl-CoA $\rightleftharpoons$ 2-oxepin-2(3H)-ylideneacetyl-CoA

The enzyme catalyses the reversible isomerization of 2-(1,2-epoxy-1,2-dihydrophenyl)acetyl-CoA.
