= Glucuronate isomerase =

glucuronate isomerase

Identifiers
- EC no.: 5.3.1.12
- CAS no.: 9023-87-4

Databases
- IntEnz: IntEnz view
- BRENDA: BRENDA entry
- ExPASy: NiceZyme view
- KEGG: KEGG entry
- MetaCyc: metabolic pathway
- PRIAM: profile
- PDB structures: RCSB PDB PDBe PDBsum
- Gene Ontology: AmiGO / QuickGO
Search
- PMC: articles
- PubMed: articles
- NCBI: proteins

In enzymology, a glucuronate isomerase (EC 5.3.1.12) is an enzyme that catalyzes the chemical reaction

D-glucuronate $\rightleftharpoons$ D-fructuronate

Hence, this enzyme has one substrate, D-glucuronate, and one product, D-fructuronate.

This enzyme belongs to the family of isomerases, specifically those intramolecular oxidoreductases interconverting aldoses and ketoses. The systematic name of this enzyme class is D-glucuronate aldose-ketose-isomerase. Other names in common use include uronic isomerase, uronate isomerase, D-glucuronate isomerase, uronic acid isomerase, and D-glucuronate ketol-isomerase. This enzyme participates in pentose and glucuronate interconversions.

== Structural studies ==
As of late 2007, two structures have been solved for this class of enzymes, with PDB accession codes 1J5S and 2Q01.
