= 2-acetolactate mutase =

Class of enzymes

Identifiers
- EC no.: 5.4.99.3
- CAS no.: 37318-52-8

Databases
- IntEnz: IntEnz view
- BRENDA: BRENDA entry
- ExPASy: NiceZyme view
- KEGG: KEGG entry
- MetaCyc: metabolic pathway
- PRIAM: profile
- PDB structures: RCSB PDB PDBe PDBsum
- Gene Ontology: AmiGO / QuickGO
Search
- PMC: articles
- PubMed: articles
- NCBI: proteins

In enzymology, a 2-acetolactate mutase (EC 5.4.99.3) is an enzyme that catalyzes the chemical reaction

2-acetolactate $\rightleftharpoons$ 3-hydroxy-3-methyl-2-oxobutanoate

Hence, this enzyme has one substrate, 2-acetolactate, and one product, 3-hydroxy-3-methyl-2-oxobutanoate.

This enzyme belongs to the family of isomerases, specifically those intramolecular transferases transferring other groups. The systematic name of this enzyme class is 2-acetolactate methylmutase. Other names in common use include acetolactate mutase, and acetohydroxy acid isomerase. This enzyme participates in valine, leucine and isoleucine biosynthesis.
