= (1-4)-a-D-glucan 1-a-D-glucosylmutase =

Class of enzymes

(1→4)-α-D-Glucan 1-α-D-glucosylmutase

Identifiers
- EC no.: 5.4.99.15
- CAS no.: 170780-49-1

Databases
- IntEnz: IntEnz view
- BRENDA: BRENDA entry
- ExPASy: NiceZyme view
- KEGG: KEGG entry
- MetaCyc: metabolic pathway
- PRIAM: profile
- PDB structures: RCSB PDB PDBe PDBsum
Search
- PMC: articles
- PubMed: articles
- NCBI: proteins

(1→4)-α-D-Glucan 1-α-D-glucosylmutase (EC 5.4.99.15, malto-oligosyltrehalose synthase, maltodextrin alpha-D-glucosyltransferase) is an enzyme with systematic name (1->4)-alpha-D-glucan 1-alpha-D-glucosylmutase. This enzyme catalyses the following chemical reaction

4-[(1->4)-alpha-D-glucosyl]n-1-D-glucose $\rightleftharpoons$ 1-alpha-D-[(1->4)-alpha-D-glucosyl]n-1-alpha-D-glucopyranoside

The enzyme from Arthrobacter sp., Sulfolobus acidocaldarius acts on (1->4)-alpha-D-glucans containing three or more (1->4)-alpha-linked D-glucose units.
