= D-Ribose pyranase =

Identifiers
- Symbol: rbsD
- PDB: 1ogc
- UniProt: P44734

Other data
- EC number: 5.4.99.62
Search for
- Structures: Swiss-model
- Domains: InterPro

D-Ribose pyranase is an enzyme that catalyzes the interconversion of β-D-ribopyranose and β-D-ribofuranose. This enzyme is an isomerase that has only been found in bacteria and viruses. It has two known functions of helping transport ribose into cells and producing β-D-ribofuranose, which can later be used to make ribose 5-phosphate for the pentose phosphate pathway (PPP). D-Ribose pyranase does not have a defined crystal structure but there are two different proposed structures. The active site of D-ribose pyranase is high in histidine residues along with a few other key binding sites.

== Reaction pathway ==
One reaction that D-ribose pyranase catalyzes is the reaction:

β-D-ribopyranose ⇌ β-D-ribofuranose

The enzyme can also catalyze the reaction:

β-allopyranose ⇌ β-allofuranose

== Function ==
D-Ribose pyranase is part of the rbs operon, which is responsible for transporting ribose. It is responsible for converting ribose, which enters the cell (by means of RbsB) in the form of beta-pyranose, into alpha-furanose, so that it can be then phosphylated, before it is further taken advantage of, by RbsK. RbsD and RbsK also slow the leakage of ribose out of the cell, because the forms they produce cannot pass through the cell membrane.

== Function ==
Ribose can either be a five membered ring (furanose) or a six membered ring (pyranose). The furanose form is more useful for cells, as it can be used in other reactions. For most cells, ribose is transported into the cell in the pyranose form. With this said, D-Ribose Pyranase needs to be present to convert the pyranose form into the furanose form. Beta-D-ribofuranose can then be converted to ribose-5-phosphate. In the images on the right, both structures have five carbons but differ in the amount of hydrogens by one, oxygens by three, and phosphorus by one. The key difference is the group on carbon four. From here, ribose 5-phosphate can enter into the pentose phosphate pathway (PPP). The PPP is a major system in metabolism that can make precursor metabolites, it has reducing power, and can produce metabolic energy. More specifically, the PPP is able to produce NADPH. NADPH is an electron donor that is able to supply reducing abilities in anabolic reactions and helps balance out redox reactions. NADPH is able to aid in the production of compounds like lipids and amino acids. Additionally, ribose 5-phosphate is able to help make nucleic acids. Therefore, the role of D-ribose pyranase is early on in the cascade of the PPP. Without D-ribose pyranase, production of many vital cell components would not be produced in a timely manner.

== Structure ==
There are many different proposed crystal structures of D-ribose pyranase, depending on the methods the structure was researched and what organism it was researched in. In a study done by Wang et al., it was thought that the structure of D-Ribose Pyranase in S. aureus is a dimeric structure based on a sitting-drop vapour-diffusion test.

The proposed crystal structure of D-ribose pyranase by Kim et al. using B. subtilis is a protein in a homodecameric assembly with two major units. The asymmetric portion of the protein crystal structure is a pentameric ring structure. This pentameric structure is connected to another pentameric ring. There are very tight interactions between these two units. It has five glycerol molecules, two chloride ions, and 369 water molecules. It was originally believed that D-ribose pyranase was an octamer in solution in terms of being investigated in E. Coli. This new study by Kim et al. showed that the structure of the asymmetric portion's subunits are an alpha beta fold. It has a central six-stranded beta sheet in between three alpha helices on one side, and both an alpha helix and a beta strand loop on the other side. There is an area in the enzyme structure that forms a sort of "cage." It has a lysine residue and water molecules which are brought together to form the cage due to a chloride ion binding. This cave is a crucial part of the stability of the protein structure. On the image on the right, the top two pictures are decameric structure of D-Ribose Pyranase.

== Active site ==
The active site of D-ribose pyranase is at position 20 and is a proton donor. The amino acid at this location is a histidine, which contains two nitrogens that are able to act as proton donors. There are other binding sites at positions 28, 98, 102,106,120,122, and 128-130 in the amino acid chain. Position 28 is an aspartic acid residue, position 98 is a histidine, position 102 is a lysine, position 106 is a histidine residue, position 120 is a tyrosine, position 122 is an asparagine, and positions 128-130 are tryptophan, alanine, and asparagine. It has been found that Tyr-120 is positioned very close to the ribose sugar when it is bound to the D-Ribose Pyranase since it provides a hydrophobic environment. His-20 and His-106 are thought of as being highly conserved. These positions are similar to that of the enzyme of FucU, which is another enzyme family that is similar to that of D-Ribose Pyranase. These two positions are crucial for the binding of ribose. In an experiment by Ryu et al., it was found that when these two positions were mutated to alanine instead of histidine, the catalytic activity of D-Ribose Pyranase was drastically reduced.
