= UDP-galactopyranose mutase =

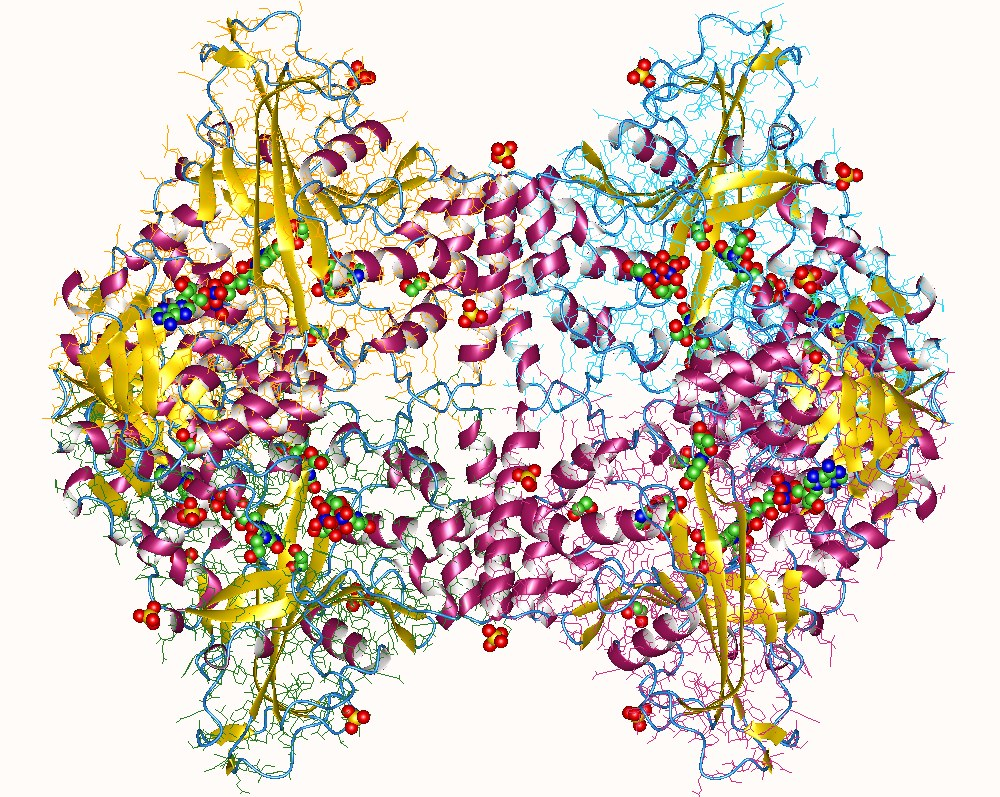
- UDP-galactopyranose mutase tetramer, Aspergillus fumigatus

Identifiers
- EC no.: 5.4.99.9
- CAS no.: 174632-18-9

Databases
- IntEnz: IntEnz view
- BRENDA: BRENDA entry
- ExPASy: NiceZyme view
- KEGG: KEGG entry
- MetaCyc: metabolic pathway
- PRIAM: profile
- PDB structures: RCSB PDB PDBe PDBsum
- Gene Ontology: AmiGO / QuickGO
Search
- PMC: articles
- PubMed: articles
- NCBI: proteins

UDP-galactopyranose mutase

Identifiers
- Symbol: UDP-GALP_mutase
- InterPro: IPR004379
Available protein structures:
- Pfam
- PDB: PDB: 1i8t

In enzymology, an UDP-galactopyranose mutase (EC 5.4.99.9) is an enzyme that catalyzes the chemical reaction

UDP-D-galactopyranose $\rightleftharpoons$ UDP-D-galacto-1,4-furanose

Hence, this enzyme has one substrate, UDP-D-galactopyranose, and one product, UDP-D-galacto-1,4-furanose.

This enzyme belongs to the family of isomerases, specifically those intramolecular transferases transferring other groups. The systematic name of this enzyme class is UDP-D-galactopyranose furanomutase.

UDP-D-galactofuranose then serves as an activated sugar donor for the biosynthesis of galactofuranose glycoconjugates. The exocyclic 1,2-diol of galactofuranose is the epitope recognized by the putative chordate immune lectin intelectin.

== Structural studies ==
Because UGM is not present in the mammalian systems but is essential among several pathogenic microbes, the enzyme is an attractive antibiotic target. As of late 2007, 5 structures have been solved for this class of enzymes, with PDB accession codes 1I8T, 1V0J, 1WAM, 2BI7, and 2BI8.
