= 23S rRNA pseudouridine2604 synthase =

Class of enzymes

23S rRNA pseudouridine^{2604} synthase

Identifiers
- EC no.: 5.4.99.21

Databases
- IntEnz: IntEnz view
- BRENDA: BRENDA entry
- ExPASy: NiceZyme view
- KEGG: KEGG entry
- MetaCyc: metabolic pathway
- PRIAM: profile
- PDB structures: RCSB PDB PDBe PDBsum
Search
- PMC: articles
- PubMed: articles
- NCBI: proteins

23S rRNA pseudouridine^{2604} synthase (EC 5.4.99.21, RluF, YjbC) is an enzyme with systematic name 23S rRNA-uridine2604 uracil mutase. This enzyme catalyses the following chemical reaction

23S rRNA uridine^{2604} $\rightleftharpoons$ 23S rRNA pseudouridine^{2604}

The enzyme can, to a small extent, also react with uridine^{2605}.
