= Isopiperitenone Delta-isomerase =

Class of enzymes

isopiperitenone delta-isomerase

Identifiers
- EC no.: 5.3.3.11
- CAS no.: 96595-07-2

Databases
- IntEnz: IntEnz view
- BRENDA: BRENDA entry
- ExPASy: NiceZyme view
- KEGG: KEGG entry
- MetaCyc: metabolic pathway
- PRIAM: profile
- PDB structures: RCSB PDB PDBe PDBsum
- Gene Ontology: AmiGO / QuickGO
Search
- PMC: articles
- PubMed: articles
- NCBI: proteins

In enzymology, an isopiperitenone Delta-isomerase (EC 5.3.3.11) is an enzyme that catalyzes the chemical reaction

isopiperitenone $\rightleftharpoons$ piperitenone

Hence, this enzyme has one substrate, isopiperitenone, and one product, piperitenone.

This enzyme belongs to the family of isomerases, specifically those intramolecular oxidoreductases transposing C=C bonds. The systematic name of this enzyme class is isopiperitenone Delta8-Delta4-isomerase.
