= Geraniol isomerase =

Identifiers
- EC no.: 5.4.4.4

Databases
- BRENDA: enzyme data
- ExPASy: NiceZyme view
- KEGG: enzyme entry
- MetaCyc: metabolic pathway
- Rhea: reactions
- PDB structures: RCSB PDB PDBe PDBsum
Search
- PMC: articles
- PubMed: articles
- NCBI: proteins

Geraniol isomerase (EC 5.4.4.4) is an enzyme with systematic name geraniol hydroxymutase. This enzyme catalyses the following chemical reaction

geraniol $\rightleftharpoons$ (3S)-linalool

In absence of oxygen the bifunctional linalool dehydratase-isomerase could act as an enzyme from this class.
