= 2,3-diketo-5-methylthiopentyl-1-phosphate enolase =

InterPro Family

Identifiers
- EC no.: 5.3.2.5

Databases
- IntEnz: IntEnz view
- BRENDA: BRENDA entry
- ExPASy: NiceZyme view
- KEGG: KEGG entry
- MetaCyc: metabolic pathway
- PRIAM: profile
- PDB structures: RCSB PDB PDBe PDBsum
Search
- PMC: articles
- PubMed: articles
- NCBI: proteins

2,3-diketo-5-methylthiopentyl-1-phosphate enolase (EC 5.3.2.5, DK-MTP-1-P enolase, MtnW, YkrW, RuBisCO-like protein, RLP) is an enzyme with systematic name 2,3-diketo-5-methylthiopentyl-1-phosphate keto-enol-isomerase. This enzyme catalyses the following chemical reaction

5-(methylthio)-2,3-dioxopentyl phosphate $\rightleftharpoons$ 2-hydroxy-5-(methylthio)-3-oxopent-1-enyl phosphate

The enzyme participates in the methionine salvage pathway in Bacillus subtilis.
