= Thiocyanate isomerase =

thiocyanate isomerase

Identifiers
- EC no.: 5.99.1.1
- CAS no.: 9023-71-6

Databases
- IntEnz: IntEnz view
- BRENDA: BRENDA entry
- ExPASy: NiceZyme view
- KEGG: KEGG entry
- MetaCyc: metabolic pathway
- PRIAM: profile
- PDB structures: RCSB PDB PDBe PDBsum
- Gene Ontology: AmiGO / QuickGO
Search
- PMC: articles
- PubMed: articles
- NCBI: proteins

In enzymology, a thiocyanate isomerase (EC 5.99.1.1) is an enzyme that catalyzes the chemical reaction

benzyl isothiocyanate $\rightleftharpoons$ benzyl thiocyanate

Hence, this enzyme has one substrate, benzyl isothiocyanate, and one product, benzyl thiocyanate.

This enzyme belongs to the family of isomerases, specifically those other isomerases sole sub-subclass for isomerases that do not belong in the other subclasses. The systematic name of this enzyme class is benzyl-thiocyanate isomerase. This enzyme is also called isothiocyanate isomerase.
