= Dammaradiene synthase =

Identifiers
- EC no.: 5.4.99.37

Databases
- IntEnz: IntEnz view
- BRENDA: BRENDA entry
- ExPASy: NiceZyme view
- KEGG: KEGG entry
- MetaCyc: metabolic pathway
- PRIAM: profile
- PDB structures: RCSB PDB PDBe PDBsum
Search
- PMC: articles
- PubMed: articles
- NCBI: proteins

Dammaradiene synthase (EC 5.4.99.37) is an enzyme with systematic name squalene mutase (cyclizing, dammara-20,24-diene-forming). This enzyme catalyses the following chemical reaction: squalene $\rightleftharpoons$ dammara-20,24-diene
