= D-sedoheptulose 7-phosphate isomerase =

Type of enzyme (protein)

Identifiers
- EC no.: 5.3.1.28

Databases
- IntEnz: IntEnz view
- BRENDA: BRENDA entry
- ExPASy: NiceZyme view
- KEGG: KEGG entry
- MetaCyc: metabolic pathway
- PRIAM: profile
- PDB structures: RCSB PDB PDBe PDBsum
Search
- PMC: articles
- PubMed: articles
- NCBI: proteins

D-sedoheptulose 7-phosphate isomerase (EC 5.3.1.28, sedoheptulose-7-phosphate isomerase, phosphoheptose isomerase, gmhA (gene), lpcA (gene)) is an enzyme with systematic name D-glycero-D-manno-heptose 7-phosphate aldose-ketose-isomerase. This enzyme catalyses the following chemical reaction

D-sedoheptulose 7-phosphate $\rightleftharpoons$ D-glycero-D-manno-heptose 7-phosphate

In Gram-negative bacteria the enzyme is involved in biosynthesis of ADP-L-glycero-β-D-manno-heptose.
