= 23S rRNA pseudouridine2605 synthase =

Class of enzymes

23S rRNA pseudouridine^{2605} synthase

Identifiers
- EC no.: 5.4.99.22

Databases
- IntEnz: IntEnz view
- BRENDA: BRENDA entry
- ExPASy: NiceZyme view
- KEGG: KEGG entry
- MetaCyc: metabolic pathway
- PRIAM: profile
- PDB structures: RCSB PDB PDBe PDBsum
Search
- PMC: articles
- PubMed: articles
- NCBI: proteins

23S rRNA pseudouridine^{2605} synthase (EC 5.4.99.22, RluB, YciL) is an enzyme with systematic name 23S rRNA-uridine^{2605} uracil mutase. This enzyme catalyses the following chemical reaction

23S rRNA uridine^{2605} $\rightleftharpoons$ 23S rRNA pseudouridine^{2605}

Pseudouridine synthase RluB converts uridine^{2605} of 23S rRNA to pseudouridine.
