= 4-oxalomesaconate tautomerase =

Class of enzymes

Identifiers
- EC no.: 5.3.2.8

Databases
- IntEnz: IntEnz view
- BRENDA: BRENDA entry
- ExPASy: NiceZyme view
- KEGG: KEGG entry
- MetaCyc: metabolic pathway
- PRIAM: profile
- PDB structures: RCSB PDB PDBe PDBsum
Search
- PMC: articles
- PubMed: articles
- NCBI: proteins

4-oxalomesaconate tautomerase (EC 5.3.2.8, GalD) is an enzyme with systematic name 4-oxalomesaconate keto---enol-isomerase. This enzyme catalyses the following chemical reaction

(1E)-4-oxobut-1-ene-1,2,4-tricarboxylate $\rightleftharpoons$ (1E,3E)-4-hydroxybuta-1,3-diene-1,2,4-tricarboxylate

This enzyme has been characterized from the bacterium Pseudomonas putida.
