= Methylitaconate Delta-isomerase =

Methylitaconate Δ-isomerase

Identifiers
- EC no.: 5.3.3.6
- CAS no.: 9059-08-9

Databases
- IntEnz: IntEnz view
- BRENDA: BRENDA entry
- ExPASy: NiceZyme view
- KEGG: KEGG entry
- MetaCyc: metabolic pathway
- PRIAM: profile
- PDB structures: RCSB PDB PDBe PDBsum
- Gene Ontology: AmiGO / QuickGO
Search
- PMC: articles
- PubMed: articles
- NCBI: proteins

In enzymology, a methylitaconate Δ-isomerase (EC 5.3.3.6) is an enzyme that catalyzes the chemical reaction

methylitaconate $\rightleftharpoons$ 2,3-dimethylmaleate

Hence, this enzyme has one substrate, methylitaconate, and one product, 2,3-dimethylmaleate.

This enzyme belongs to the family of isomerases, specifically those intramolecular oxidoreductases transposing C=C bonds. The systematic name of this enzyme class is methylitaconate Delta2-Delta3-isomerase. This enzyme is also called methylitaconate isomerase. This enzyme participates in c5-branched dibasic acid metabolism.
