= 2-methyleneglutarate mutase =

Class of enzymes

Identifiers
- EC no.: 5.4.99.4
- CAS no.: 9059-10-3

Databases
- IntEnz: IntEnz view
- BRENDA: BRENDA entry
- ExPASy: NiceZyme view
- KEGG: KEGG entry
- MetaCyc: metabolic pathway
- PRIAM: profile
- PDB structures: RCSB PDB PDBe PDBsum
- Gene Ontology: AmiGO / QuickGO
Search
- PMC: articles
- PubMed: articles
- NCBI: proteins

In enzymology, a 2-methyleneglutarate mutase (EC 5.4.99.4) is an enzyme that catalyzes the chemical reaction

2-methyleneglutarate $\rightleftharpoons$ 2-methylene-3-methylsuccinate

Hence, this enzyme has one substrate, 2-methyleneglutarate, and one product, 2-methylene-3-methylsuccinate.

This enzyme belongs to the family of isomerases, specifically those intramolecular transferases transferring other groups. The systematic name of this enzyme class is 2-methyleneglutarate carboxy-methylenemethylmutase. This enzyme is also called alpha-methyleneglutarate mutase. This enzyme participates in c5-branched dibasic acid metabolism. It employs one cofactor, cobamide.
