= Ribose isomerase =

ribose isomerase

Identifiers
- EC no.: 5.3.1.20
- CAS no.: 57534-76-6

Databases
- IntEnz: IntEnz view
- BRENDA: BRENDA entry
- ExPASy: NiceZyme view
- KEGG: KEGG entry
- MetaCyc: metabolic pathway
- PRIAM: profile
- PDB structures: RCSB PDB PDBe PDBsum
- Gene Ontology: AmiGO / QuickGO
Search
- PMC: articles
- PubMed: articles
- NCBI: proteins

In enzymology, a ribose isomerase (EC 5.3.1.20) is an enzyme that catalyzes the chemical reaction

D-ribose $\rightleftharpoons$ D-ribulose

Hence, this enzyme has one substrate, D-ribose, and one product, D-ribulose.

This enzyme belongs to the family of isomerases, specifically those intramolecular oxidoreductases interconverting aldoses and ketoses. The systematic name of this enzyme class is D-ribose aldose-ketose-isomerase. Other names in common use include D-ribose isomerase, and D-ribose ketol-isomerase.
