= 21S rRNA pseudouridine2819 synthase =

Class of enzymes

21S rRNA pseudouridine^{2819} synthase

Identifiers
- EC no.: 5.4.99.43

Databases
- IntEnz: IntEnz view
- BRENDA: BRENDA entry
- ExPASy: NiceZyme view
- KEGG: KEGG entry
- MetaCyc: metabolic pathway
- PRIAM: profile
- PDB structures: RCSB PDB PDBe PDBsum
Search
- PMC: articles
- PubMed: articles
- NCBI: proteins

21S rRNA pseudouridine^{2819} synthase (EC 5.4.99.43, Pus5p) is an enzyme with systematic name 21S rRNA-uridine^{2819} uracil mutase. This enzyme catalyses the following chemical reaction

21S rRNA uridine^{2819} $\rightleftharpoons$ 21S rRNA pseudouridine^{2819}

The enzyme specifically acts on uridine^{2819} in 21S rRNA.
