= 3-(hydroxyamino)phenol mutase =

Class of enzymes

Identifiers
- EC no.: 5.4.4.3

Databases
- IntEnz: IntEnz view
- BRENDA: BRENDA entry
- ExPASy: NiceZyme view
- KEGG: KEGG entry
- MetaCyc: metabolic pathway
- PRIAM: profile
- PDB structures: RCSB PDB PDBe PDBsum
Search
- PMC: articles
- PubMed: articles
- NCBI: proteins

In enzymology, a 3-(hydroxyamino)phenol mutase (EC 5.4.4.3) is an enzyme that catalyzes the chemical reaction

3-hydroxyaminophenol $\rightleftharpoons$ aminohydroquinone

Hence, this enzyme has one substrate, 3-hydroxyaminophenol, and one product, aminohydroquinone.

This enzyme belongs to the family of isomerases, specifically those intramolecular transferases transferring hydroxy groups. The systematic name of this enzyme class is 3-(hydroxyamino)phenol hydroxymutase. Other names in common use include 3-hydroxylaminophenol mutase, and 3HAP mutase.
