= 23S rRNA pseudouridine1911/1915/1917 synthase =

Class of enzymes

23S rRNA pseudouridine^{1911/1915/1917} synthase

Identifiers
- EC no.: 5.4.99.23

Databases
- IntEnz: IntEnz view
- BRENDA: BRENDA entry
- ExPASy: NiceZyme view
- KEGG: KEGG entry
- MetaCyc: metabolic pathway
- PRIAM: profile
- PDB structures: RCSB PDB PDBe PDBsum
Search
- PMC: articles
- PubMed: articles
- NCBI: proteins

23S rRNA pseudouridine^{1911/1915/1917} synthase (also known as RluD)(EC 5.4.99.23, RluD, pseudouridine synthase RluD) is an enzyme with systematic name 23S rRNA-uridine^{1911/1915/1917} uracil mutase. This enzyme catalyses the following chemical reaction

23S rRNA uridine^{1911}/uridine^{1915}/uridine^{1917} $\rightleftharpoons$ 23S rRNA pseudouridine^{1911}/pseudouridine^{1915}/pseudouridine^{1917}

These nucleotides are located in the functionally important helix-loop 69 of 23S rRNA.
