= TRNA pseudouridine55 synthase =

Enzyme

tRNA pseudouridine^{55} synthase

Identifiers
- EC no.: 5.4.99.25
- CAS no.: 430429-15-5

Databases
- IntEnz: IntEnz view
- BRENDA: BRENDA entry
- ExPASy: NiceZyme view
- KEGG: KEGG entry
- MetaCyc: metabolic pathway
- PRIAM: profile
- PDB structures: RCSB PDB PDBe PDBsum
Search
- PMC: articles
- PubMed: articles
- NCBI: proteins

tRNA pseudouridine^{55} synthase (EC 5.4.99.25, TruB, aCbf5, Pus4, YNL292w (gene), Psi55 tRNA pseudouridine synthase, tRNA:Psi^{55}-synthase, tRNA pseudouridine 55 synthase, tRNA:pseudouridine-55 synthase, Psi^{55} synthase, tRNA Psi^{55} synthase, tRNA:Psi^{55} synthase, tRNA-uridine^{55} uracil mutase, Pus10, tRNA-uridine^{54/55} uracil mutase) is an enzyme with systematic name tRNA-uridine^{55} uracil mutase. This enzyme catalyses the following chemical reaction

tRNA uridine^{55} $\rightleftharpoons$ tRNA pseudouridine^{55}

Pseudouridine synthase TruB from Escherichia coli specifically modifies uridine^{55} in tRNA molecules.
