= DTDP-L-rhamnose 4-epimerase =

Enzyme

Identifiers
- EC no.: 5.1.3.25

Databases
- IntEnz: IntEnz view
- BRENDA: BRENDA entry
- ExPASy: NiceZyme view
- KEGG: KEGG entry
- MetaCyc: metabolic pathway
- PRIAM: profile
- PDB structures: RCSB PDB PDBe PDBsum
Search
- PMC: articles
- PubMed: articles
- NCBI: proteins

DTDP-L-rhamnose 4-epimerase (EC 5.1.3.25, dTDP-4-L-rhamnose 4-epimerase, wbiB (gene)) is an enzyme with systematic name dTDP-6-deoxy-beta-L-talose 4-epimerase. This enzyme catalyses the following chemical reaction

dTDP-6-deoxy-beta-L-talose $\rightleftharpoons$ dTDP-6-deoxy-beta-L-mannose

The equilibrium is strongly towards dTDP-6-deoxy-beta-L-mannose.
