= Thiazole tautomerase =

Identifiers
- EC no.: 5.3.99.10

Databases
- IntEnz: IntEnz view
- BRENDA: BRENDA entry
- ExPASy: NiceZyme view
- KEGG: KEGG entry
- MetaCyc: metabolic pathway
- PRIAM: profile
- PDB structures: RCSB PDB PDBe PDBsum
Search
- PMC: articles
- PubMed: articles
- NCBI: proteins

Thiazole tautomerase (EC 5.3.99.10, tenI (gene)) is an enzyme with systematic name 2-(2-carboxy-4-methylthiazol-5-yl)ethyl phosphate isomerase. This enzyme catalyses the following chemical reaction

2-[(2R,5Z)-2-carboxy-4-methylthiazol-5(2H)-ylidene]ethyl phosphate $\rightleftharpoons$ 2-(2-carboxy-4-methylthiazol-5-yl)ethyl phosphate

The enzyme catalyses the irreversible aromatization of the thiazole moiety of 2-[(2R,5Z)-2-carboxy-4-methylthiazol-5(2H)-ylidene]ethyl phosphate.
