= UDP-2,3-diacetamido-2,3-dideoxyglucuronic acid 2-epimerase =

Enzyme

Identifiers
- EC no.: 5.1.3.23

Databases
- IntEnz: IntEnz view
- BRENDA: BRENDA entry
- ExPASy: NiceZyme view
- KEGG: KEGG entry
- MetaCyc: metabolic pathway
- PRIAM: profile
- PDB structures: RCSB PDB PDBe PDBsum
Search
- PMC: articles
- PubMed: articles
- NCBI: proteins

UDP-2,3-diacetamido-2,3-dideoxyglucuronic acid 2-epimerase (EC 5.1.3.23, UDP-GlcNAc3NAcA 2-epimerase, UDP-alpha-D-GlcNAc3NAcA 2-epimerase, 2,3-diacetamido-2,3-dideoxy-alpha-D-glucuronic acid 2-epimerase, WbpI, WlbD) is an enzyme with systematic name 2,3-diacetamido-2,3-dideoxy-alpha-D-glucuronate 2-epimerase. This enzyme catalyses the following chemical reaction

UDP-2,3-diacetamido-2,3-dideoxy-alpha-D-glucuronate $\rightleftharpoons$ UDP-2,3-diacetamido-2,3-dideoxy-alpha-D-mannuronate

This enzyme participates in the biosynthetic pathway for UDP-alpha-D-ManNAc3NAcA.
