= TDP-4-oxo-6-deoxy-alpha-D-glucose-3,4-oxoisomerase (dTDP-3-dehydro-6-deoxy-alpha-D-glucopyranose-forming) =

Identifiers
- EC no.: 5.3.2.4

Databases
- IntEnz: IntEnz view
- BRENDA: BRENDA entry
- ExPASy: NiceZyme view
- KEGG: KEGG entry
- MetaCyc: metabolic pathway
- PRIAM: profile
- PDB structures: RCSB PDB PDBe PDBsum
Search
- PMC: articles
- PubMed: articles
- NCBI: proteins

TDP-4-oxo-6-deoxy-alpha-D-glucose-3,4-oxoisomerase (dTDP-3-dehydro-6-deoxy-alpha-D-glucopyranose-forming) (EC 5.3.2.4, TDP-4-keto-6-deoxy-D-glucose-3,4-ketoisomerase, Tyl1a, dTDP-4-keto-6-deoxy-D-glucose-3,4-ketoisomerase) is an enzyme with systematic name dTDP-4-dehydro-6-deoxy-alpha-D-glucopyranose:dTDP-3-dehydro-6-deoxy-alpha-D-glucopyranose isomerase. This enzyme catalyses the following chemical reaction

dTDP-4-dehydro-6-deoxy-alpha-D-glucopyranose $\rightleftharpoons$ dTDP-3-dehydro-6-deoxy-alpha-D-glucopyranose

The enzyme is involved in biosynthesis of D-mycaminose.
