= Lysine 2,3-aminomutase =

Identifiers
- EC no.: 5.4.3.2
- CAS no.: 9075-20-1

Databases
- IntEnz: IntEnz view
- BRENDA: BRENDA entry
- ExPASy: NiceZyme view
- KEGG: KEGG entry
- MetaCyc: metabolic pathway
- PRIAM: profile
- PDB structures: RCSB PDB PDBe PDBsum
Search
- PMC: articles
- PubMed: articles
- NCBI: proteins

Lysine 2,3-aminomutase (KAM or LAM) (EC 5.4.3.2) is a radical SAM enzyme that facilitates the conversion of the amino acid lysine to beta-lysine. It accomplishes this interconversion using three cofactors and a 5'-deoxyadenosyl radical formed in a S-Adenosyl methionine (SAM) activated radical reaction pathway.^{[1]}

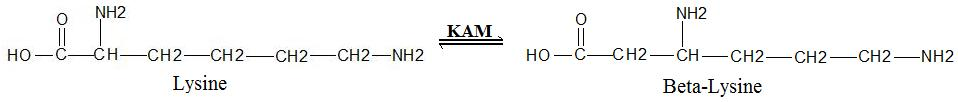
Reaction catalyzed by KAM

== Structure ==
Shown on the right is the three-dimensional structure of the Lysine 2,3-aminomutase protein. The structure was determined by X-ray crystallography to 2.1 Angstrom resolution and was seen to crystallize as a homotetramer.^{[2]} KAM was first purified and characterized in Clostridium subterminale for studies of Lysine metabolism.

== Cofactors ==
Pyridoxal phosphate

Four key cofactors are required for the reaction catalyzed by the lysine 2,3-aminomutase enzyme. They are:

- S-Adenosyl methionine (SAM): Helps generate the radical intermediate by borrowing an electron.
- Pyridoxal phosphate (PLP): Responsible for binding of the amino acid during reaction. The pi-system of this molecule facilitates radical delocalization during formation of an aziridinyl radical. The structure is given below:
- Zinc metal: Required for coordination between the dimers in the protein.
- Iron-sulfur cluster: A 4 iron-4 sulfur cluster is required for formation of a 5'-deoxyadenosyl radical. This radical then acts as the "stable" radical carrier in the reaction mechanism which transfers the radical to the amino acid.

== Reaction Mechanism ==
The generalized reaction takes place in 5 steps:

1. Radical Formation: A "stable" radical is formed through a radical SAM mechanism in which a S-adenosyl methionine forms a 5'-deoxyadenosyl radical.
2. Enzyme Binding: Lysine 2,3-aminomutase binds to pyridoxal phosphate (PLP).
3. Amino Acid Binding: The amino acid (Lysine or Beta-Lysine depending on forward or reverse reactions) binds to pyridoxal phosphate.
4. Radical Transfer: The 5'-deoxyadenosyl radical is transferred to the amino acid and an aziridinyl radical is formed. In this configuration, the radical is stabilized by the pi-system of pyridoxal phosphate.
5. Amino Acid Conversion: In the final step, the new amino acid is formed and the radical is returned to its more stable state on the 5'-deoxyadenosyl.

The reaction mechanism described above is shown below:

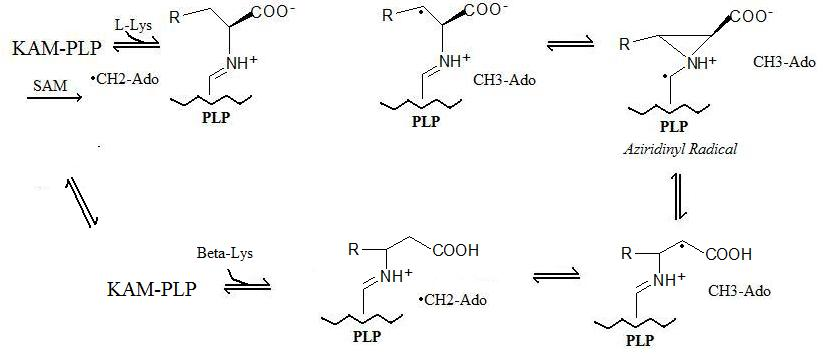
