= 23S rRNA pseudouridine955/2504/2580 synthase =

Class of enzymes

23S rRNA pseudouridine^{955/2504/2580} synthase

Identifiers
- EC no.: 5.4.99.24

Databases
- IntEnz: IntEnz view
- BRENDA: BRENDA entry
- ExPASy: NiceZyme view
- KEGG: KEGG entry
- MetaCyc: metabolic pathway
- PRIAM: profile
- PDB structures: RCSB PDB PDBe PDBsum
Search
- PMC: articles
- PubMed: articles
- NCBI: proteins

23S rRNA pseudouridine^{955/2504/2580} synthase (EC 5.4.99.24, RluC, pseudouridine synthase RluC) is an enzyme with the systematic name 23S rRNA-uridine^{955/2504/2580} uracil mutase. This enzyme catalyses the following chemical reaction

23S rRNA uridine^{955}/uridine^{2504}/uridine^{2580} $\rightleftharpoons$ 23S rRNA pseudouridine^{955}/pseudouridine^{2504}/pseudouridine^{2580}

The enzyme converts uridines at positions 955, 2504 and 2580 of 23S rRNA to pseudouridines.
