= TRNA-pseudouridine synthase I =

tRNA-pseudouridine synthase

Identifiers
- EC no.: 5.4.99.12

Databases
- IntEnz: IntEnz view
- BRENDA: BRENDA entry
- ExPASy: NiceZyme view
- KEGG: KEGG entry
- MetaCyc: metabolic pathway
- PRIAM: profile
- PDB structures: RCSB PDB PDBe PDBsum
- Gene Ontology: AmiGO / QuickGO
Search
- PMC: articles
- PubMed: articles
- NCBI: proteins

In enzymology, a tRNA-pseudouridine synthase I (EC 5.4.99.12) is an enzyme that catalyzes the chemical reaction

tRNA uridine $\rightleftharpoons$ tRNA pseudouridine

Hence, this enzyme has one substrate, tRNA uridine, and one product, tRNA pseudouridine.

This enzyme belongs to the family of isomerases, specifically those intramolecular transferases transferring other groups. The systematic name of this enzyme class is tRNA-uridine uracilmutase. Other names in common use include tRNA-uridine isomerase, tRNA pseudouridylate synthase I, transfer ribonucleate pseudouridine synthetase, pseudouridine synthase, and transfer RNA pseudouridine synthetase.

== Structural studies ==
As of late 2007, 4 structures have been solved for this class of enzymes, with PDB accession codes 1VS3, 2NQP, 2NR0, and 2NRE.
