= 6-phospho-3-hexuloisomerase =

Class of enzymes

Identifiers
- EC no.: 5.3.1.27

Databases
- IntEnz: IntEnz view
- BRENDA: BRENDA entry
- ExPASy: NiceZyme view
- KEGG: KEGG entry
- MetaCyc: metabolic pathway
- PRIAM: profile
- PDB structures: RCSB PDB PDBe PDBsum
Search
- PMC: articles
- PubMed: articles
- NCBI: proteins

6-phospho-3-hexuloisomerase (EC 5.3.1.27, 3-hexulose-6-phosphate isomerase, phospho-3-hexuloisomerase, PHI, 6-phospho-3-hexulose isomerase, YckF) is an enzyme with systematic name D-arabino-hex-3-ulose-6-phosphate isomerase. This enzyme catalyses the following chemical reaction

D-arabino-hex-3-ulose 6-phosphate $\rightleftharpoons$ D-fructose 6-phosphate

This enzyme plays a key role in the ribulose-monophosphate cycle of formaldehyde fixation.
