= 16S rRNA pseudouridine516 synthase =

Class of enzymes

16S rRNA pseudouridine^{516} synthase

Identifiers
- EC no.: 5.4.99.19

Databases
- IntEnz: IntEnz view
- BRENDA: BRENDA entry
- ExPASy: NiceZyme view
- KEGG: KEGG entry
- MetaCyc: metabolic pathway
- PRIAM: profile
- PDB structures: RCSB PDB PDBe PDBsum
Search
- PMC: articles
- PubMed: articles
- NCBI: proteins

16S rRNA pseudouridine^{516} synthase (EC 5.4.99.19, 16S RNA pseudouridine^{516} synthase, 16S PsiI^{516} synthase, 16S RNA Psi^{516} synthase, RNA pseudouridine synthase RsuA, RsuA, 16S RNA pseudouridine 516 synthase) is an enzyme with systematic name 16S rRNA-uridine^{516} uracil mutase. This enzyme catalyses the following chemical reaction

16S rRNA uridine^{516} $\rightleftharpoons$ 16S rRNA pseudouridine^{516}

The enzyme is specific for uridine^{516} in 16S rRNA.
