= Epimerase and racemase =

Epimerases and racemases are isomerase enzymes that catalyze the inversion of stereochemistry in biological molecules. Racemases catalyze the stereochemical inversion around the asymmetric carbon atom in a substrate having only one center of asymmetry, i.e. they catalyze interconversion between two enantiomers. On the other hand, epimerases catalyze the stereochemical inversion of the configuration about an asymmetric carbon atom in a substrate having more than one center of asymmetry, thus interconverting epimers. Due to this, both epimerases and racemases lack the usual stereospecificity of enzymes, because they are able to catalyze the inversion in both directions. Unlike most other enzymes, which return to their resting state after they catalyze a reaction and can catalyze the same reaction again, epimerases and racemases instead finish in a state which is available for the catalysis of the reverse reaction.

== Structure ==
Epimerases and racemases can either be confactor-independent, i.e. only rely on the protein to catalyze their reaction, or can be cofactor-dependent, using a non-proteinaceous structure for catalysis, e.g. metal ions or PLP.

== Importance ==
Human epimerases include methylmalonyl-CoA epimerase, involved in the metabolic breakdown of the amino acids alanine, isoleucine, methionine and valine, and UDP-glucose 4-epimerase, which is used in the final step of galactose metabolism – catalyzing the reversible conversion of UDP-galactose to UDP-glucose.

Racemases are important to obtain D-amino acids which have various uses, highlighting the importance of enzymes such as alanine racemase. Phosphopentose epimerase participates in the pentose phosphate pathway used to generate energy in the form of NADH.

== See also ==
- Galactose epimerase deficiency
