= 2-Epimerase =

2-Epimerase can refer one of to several enzymes:

- N-acylglucosamine 2-epimerase
- N-acylglucosamine-6-phosphate 2-epimerase
- UDP-N-acetylglucosamine 2-epimerase, the target of the experimental antibiotic epimerox
- UDP-N-acetylglucosamine 2-epimerase (hydrolysing)
- UDP-N,N'-diacetylbacillosamine 2-epimerase (hydrolysing)
- CDP-paratose 2-epimerase
