= QuayCity Q3 =

Bus service in Tyne and Wear, England

VOLTRA Q3
- Commenced operation: 26 July 2015; 11 years ago
- Locale: Tyne and Wear, England
- Service area: Gosforth; Jesmond; Newcastle upon Tyne; Quayside; Ouseburn; Walker; Wallsend
- Service type: Bus service
- Fleet: Yutong E12
- Operator: Go North East
- Website: Go North East

The VOLTRA Q3 (formerly known as Quaycity Q3) is a bus service operated by Go North East, which connects the suburbs of Gosforth, Jesmond, Ouseburn, Walker and Wallsend with the city of Newcastle upon Tyne and Quayside in Tyne and Wear, England.

== History ==
The service was introduced in July 2015, following the merger of the existing Q2 and X40 routes. At the time of its introduction, the service operated under the QuayLink name and was served by a fleet of diesel-powered Optare Versa single-deckers, finished in a two-tone yellow and green livery. Initially operating between Newcastle Great Park and St Peter's Basin, the service was extended to Walker and Wallsend in July 2016.

In June 2017, contactless payments were introduced, as part of a trial. It was later rolled out across the network.

In December 2020, the QuayLink branding was replaced, with the route rebranded as Quaycity and a new two-tone yellow and black livery introduced. At the same time, the vehicles underwent interior refurbishment and were upgraded to meet Euro 6 emissions standards, in preparation for the introduction of Newcastle upon Tyne's Clean Air Zone.

In March 2022, the service was curtailed at St Peter's Basin, with the section serving Walker and Wallsend withdrawn. From the same date, the route was amended to serve Jesmond, running via Osborne Road, replacing the previous routing along Great North Road – resulting in longer journey times.

In July 2022, the service was renumbered QA & QB, reflecting the direction travelled around Great Park. The link between St Peter's Basin and Wallsend was also restored as part of these changes.

By September 2022, the service had reverted to its former Q3 route number, with the route operating as a one-way loop through Great Park. In the same month, a fleet of nine Yutong E12 battery electric single-deck vehicles were introduced.

In September 2024, the service was further amended, with the section between Brunton Park and Great Park withdrawn. The route in Brunton Park was also amended, with buses now operating via Warkworth Woods and Polwarth Drive. The direct link between the city centre and Great Park was replaced by services 49 (via Gosforth) and X47 (via Kingston Park) operated by Stagecoach North East.

In 2025, the VOLTRA QuayCity and VOLTRA Saltwell Park brands were discontinued in favour of a generic two-tone blue and red brand encompassing all Go North East routes operated by electric buses under a single identity. Following delivery of a fleet of battery electric Alexander Dennis Enviro 200MMC and Wright StreetDeck Electroliner in January 2026, routes 58 and X66 also joined the VOLTRA brand.

== Route ==
The route commences in Brunton Park, with buses operating in a one-way loop via Warkworth Woods, Netherwitton Drive and Polwarth Drive before joining the Great North Road. The route then follows the Great North Road south towards Regent Centre Interchange, providing connections with the Metro.

From Regent Centre, the route continues along Gosforth High Street before taking a detour through Jesmond, serving Osborne Road. During peak times, Q3X services instead remain on the Great North Road, providing a direct route into the city centre.

In the city centre, buses towards Brunton Park serve Haymarket, with services towards Wallsend instead turning left from St Mary's Place onto John Dobson Street.

In the Monument area of the city, buses towards Brunton Park serve Pilgrim Street, while services towards Wallsend serve Market Street, before continuing towards the Quayside and Ouseburn. On reaching St Peter's Basin, evening and Sunday services terminate, with buses operating a one-way loop via St Lawrence Road and Bottlehouse Street.

Journeys continuing towards Wallsend operate via the length of Walker Road, then serving Walkergate, crossing the border into North Tyneside before continuing to the terminus at Wallsend.

== Service and operations ==
As of August 2026, service Q3 operates up to every 20 minutes between Brunton Park and Wallsend during the day on weekdays and Saturday, with a half-hourly service between Brunton Park and St Peter’s Basin on Sunday. During peak times, service Q3X operates, running fast via Great North Road.

The service is currently operated by a fleet of battery electric Yutong E12 single-deck vehicles, branded in a two-tone blue and red livery, which feature free WiFi, audio-visual next stop announcements and USB charging.
