= NEUC =

NEUC may refer to:

- New Era University College, a private university college in Malaysia
- UDP-N-acetylglucosamine 2-epimerase (hydrolysing), an enzyme
- UDP-N,N'-diacetylbacillosamine 2-epimerase (hydrolysing), an enzyme
