= GNE =

GNE may refer to:

- Equatorial Guinea, ITU country code
- GNE (encyclopedia), a free content encyclopedia
- GNE (gene)
- Ganang language, spoken in Nigeria
- General Northern English
- Genesis Energy Limited, a New Zealand energy company
- Go North East, an English bus operator
- UDP-N-acetylglucosamine 2-epimerase (hydrolysing)
- Guru Nanak Dev Engineering College, Ludhiana (GNE Ludhiana), Punjab, India
