= SIAA =

SIAA may refer to:

- Southern Intercollegiate Athletic Association, defunct American college athletic conference
- UDP-N-acetylglucosamine 2-epimerase (hydrolysing), an enzyme
