= QuayLink =

Group of bus services in Tyne and Wear, England

QuayLink QuayCity/VOLTRA
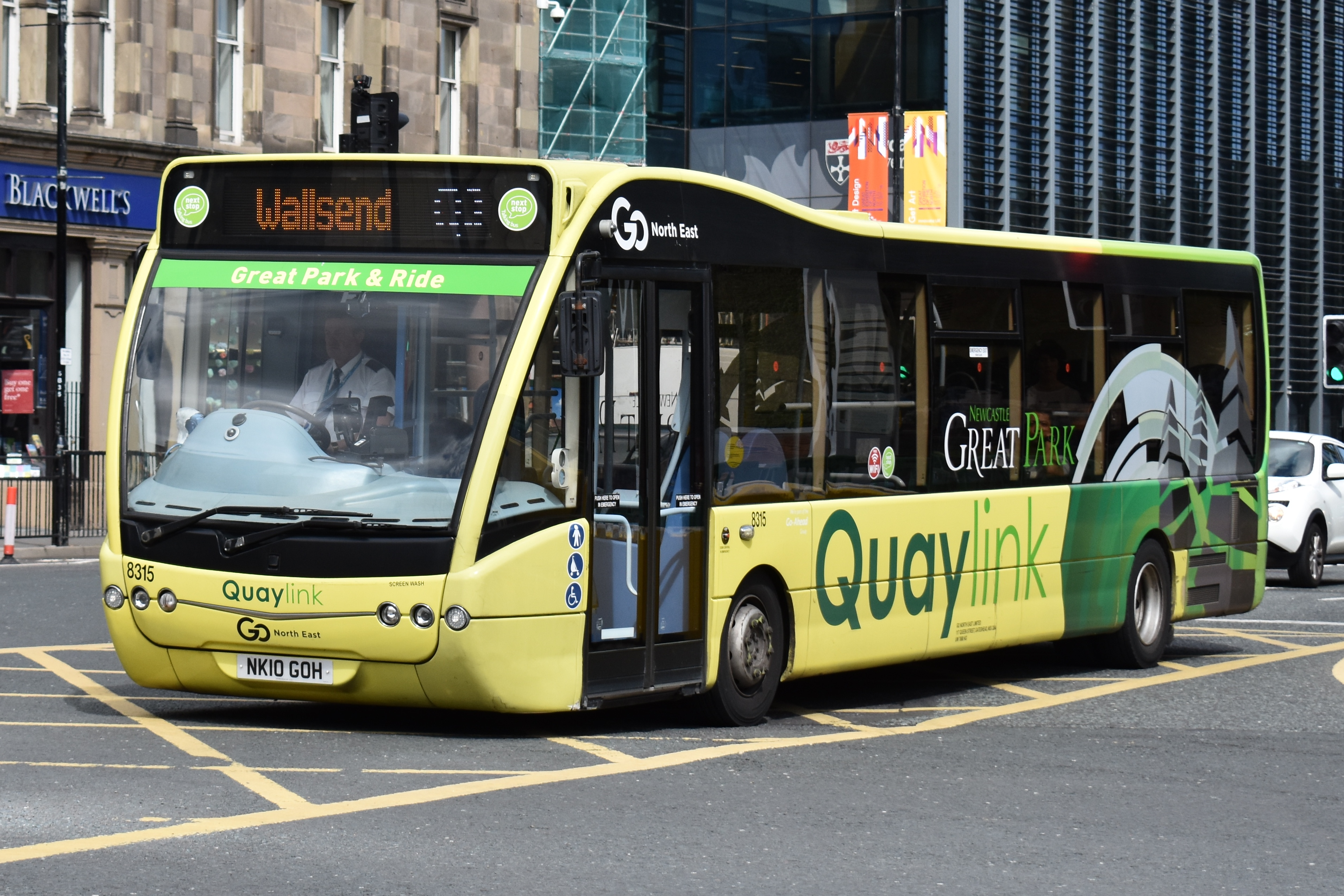
- A Go North East Optare Versa in the third version of the QuayLink livery, seen at Haymarket in August 2018.
- Parent: Tyne and Wear PTE (2005–2015)
- Commenced operation: 22 July 2005 (20 years ago)
- Ceased operation: 5 September 2021 (4 years ago) (Note: Services continued under the VOLTRA and QuayCity brands.)
- Locale: Tyne and Wear, England
- Service area: Gateshead; Newcastle upon Tyne; North Tyneside
- Service type: Bus service
- Routes: 2
- Fleet: Yutong E12 (2020–); Optare Versa (2010–2022); Designline Olympus (2005–2010)
- Operator: Go North East (2010–present); Stagecoach North East (2005–2010)
- Website: Go North East

QuayLink was a bus service in Tyne and Wear, England, which connected Gateshead and Newcastle upon Tyne, and later North Tyneside, with the Quayside. Funded by the Tyne and Wear Passenger Transport Executive, the service was launched on 22 July 2005. Operated initially by Stagecoach North East, the service was transferred to Go North East in July 2010 – later being operated commercially from July 2015, following budget cuts.

== History ==
QuayLink was designed as a frequent, high quality bus service, for the newly developed and expanding Quayside area. Despite being located a short distance from the town centre of Gateshead and city centre of Newcastle upon Tyne, the area was poorly served by public transport.

In June 2002, both Gateshead Council and Newcastle City Council, along with the Tyne and Wear Passenger Transport Executive, invited tenders for operation of a proposed Tyne Quayside Link, as well as the manufacture of eight alternatively-fuelled buses. The proposed project, scheduled for launch in 2004, would cost £5 million – with £3 million coming from the local transport plan, £1 million from regeneration funds for Gateshead, and £1 million from Quayside developers. As well as new buses, the project involved the construction of a bus lane, and improvements to some bus stops, making them fully accessible.

The brand was launched on 22 July 2005, using a fleet of ten Designline Olymbus turbine-electric hybrid vehicles – a project costing £7.7 million. Prior to the launch, all ten vehicles were pictured, along with local dignitaries and partner representatives, at an opening ceremony held on the Quayside.

== Service and operations ==
=== Stagecoach North East (2005–2010) ===
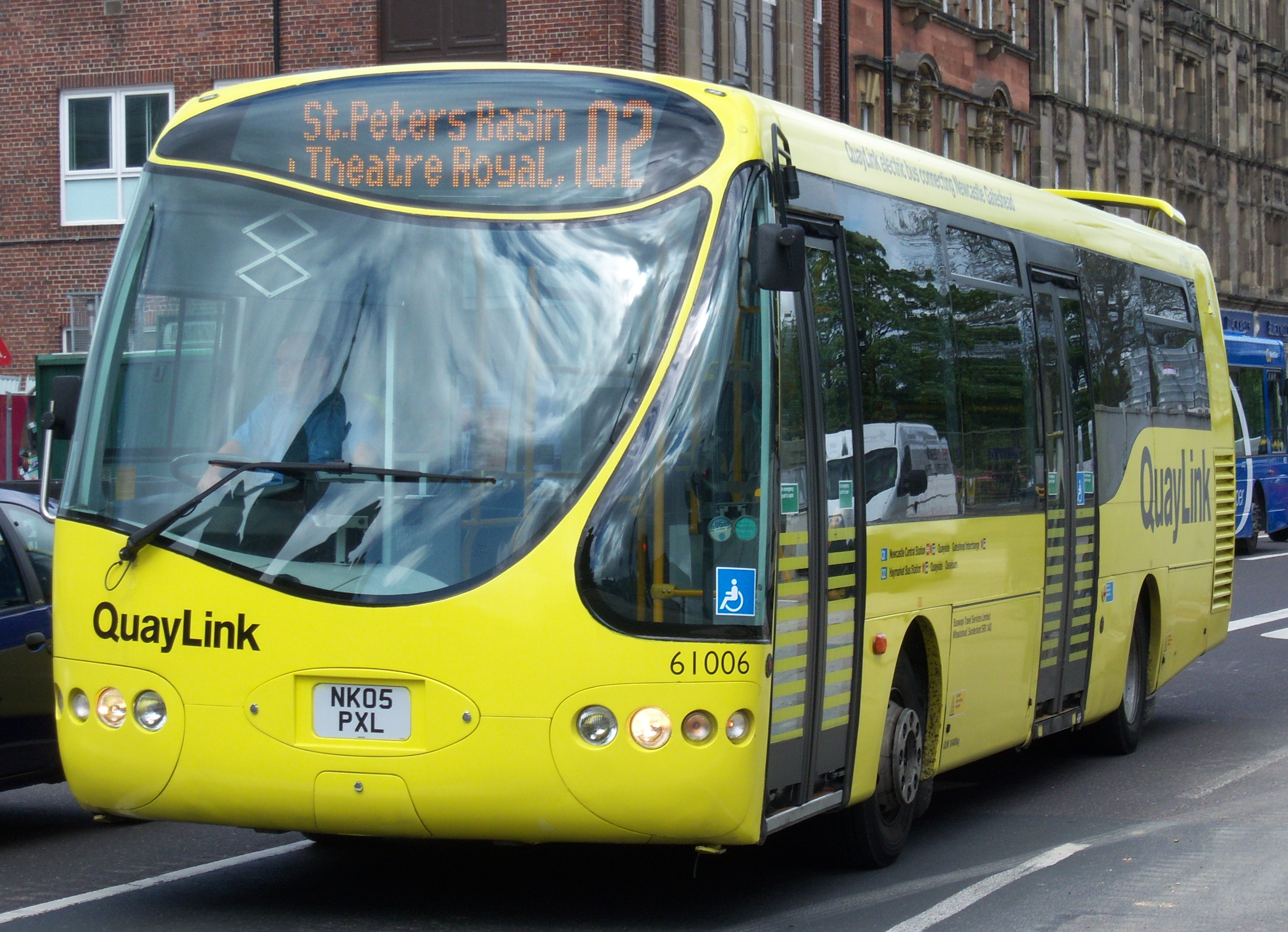
A Stagecoach North East Designline Olymbus in the first version of the QuayLink livery, seen at Haymarket in May 2009.

==== Fleet and operations ====
Stagecoach North East won the contract to operate the service, with a fleet of ten Designline Olymbus turbine-electric hybrid vehicles, built in New Zealand – at a cost in the region of £250,000 per vehicle. A prototype arrived in October 2004, subsequently touring across the country as a demonstration vehicle, until April 2005. Delivery of the remaining nine vehicles to the depot at Walkergate followed, after the completion of upgrades to the depot, necessary to receiving the new vehicles.

The vehicles were substantially modified for operation in England, notably using a leaf door design, over the plug design. Vehicles were dual-doored, with the middle door used only for wheelchair access. Initially, the vehicles were turbine-electric hybrids, in which the wheels were driven only by electric motors, powered by on-board battery packs. The batteries were charged overnight, and then re-charged while the bus was in operation by a liquid-fuelled turbine-generator and through regenerative braking. Even with the turbine running, the buses were credited with a markedly quiet ride, when compared to regular diesel-powered vehicles.

By the end of 2008, the turbines were unable to keep the batteries charged for the whole day, leading to some instances of service cancellations, and vehicles being temporarily withdrawn from service. Stagecoach North East announced its intention to replace the turbine and generators with a diesel engine as an alternative charging system, with the modification planned to be completed on one vehicle on a trial basis, and evaluated in early 2009. The anticipated cost of modifying the whole fleet was estimated to cost around £200,000.

Following contract changes in July 2010, the vehicles were withdrawn from service – aged just over five years old. They were later sold for scrap, with plans by the Tyne and Wear Passenger Transport Executive to use them on other routes not coming to fruition.

==== Service, routes and frequency ====
A partial service launched on 22 July 2005, with QuayLink operating as a free shuttle service, coinciding with the 2005 Tall Ships Race. Full service commenced on 29 July 2005, with two routes, operating at a ten minute frequency:

- Q1 connected Central Station with the Gateshead Quayside and Gateshead Interchange. Crossing the River Tyne using the Swing Bridge, the route served BALTIC, Gateshead College (from 2008) and The Sage Gateshead.
- Q2 connected Haymarket with the Newcastle Quayside and Ouseburn.

Both routes combined on a short section between Grey Street and the Quayside, with stops at Theatre Royal, Grey Street and Guildhall. Initially, passenger numbers were low, with the routes carrying around 11,000 passengers each week. Ridership later increased, with one million passenger journeys having been made by May 2007. In September 2007, following the re-development of the Ouseburn Valley, service Q2 was extended east to St Peter's Basin.

=== Go North East (2010–present) ===
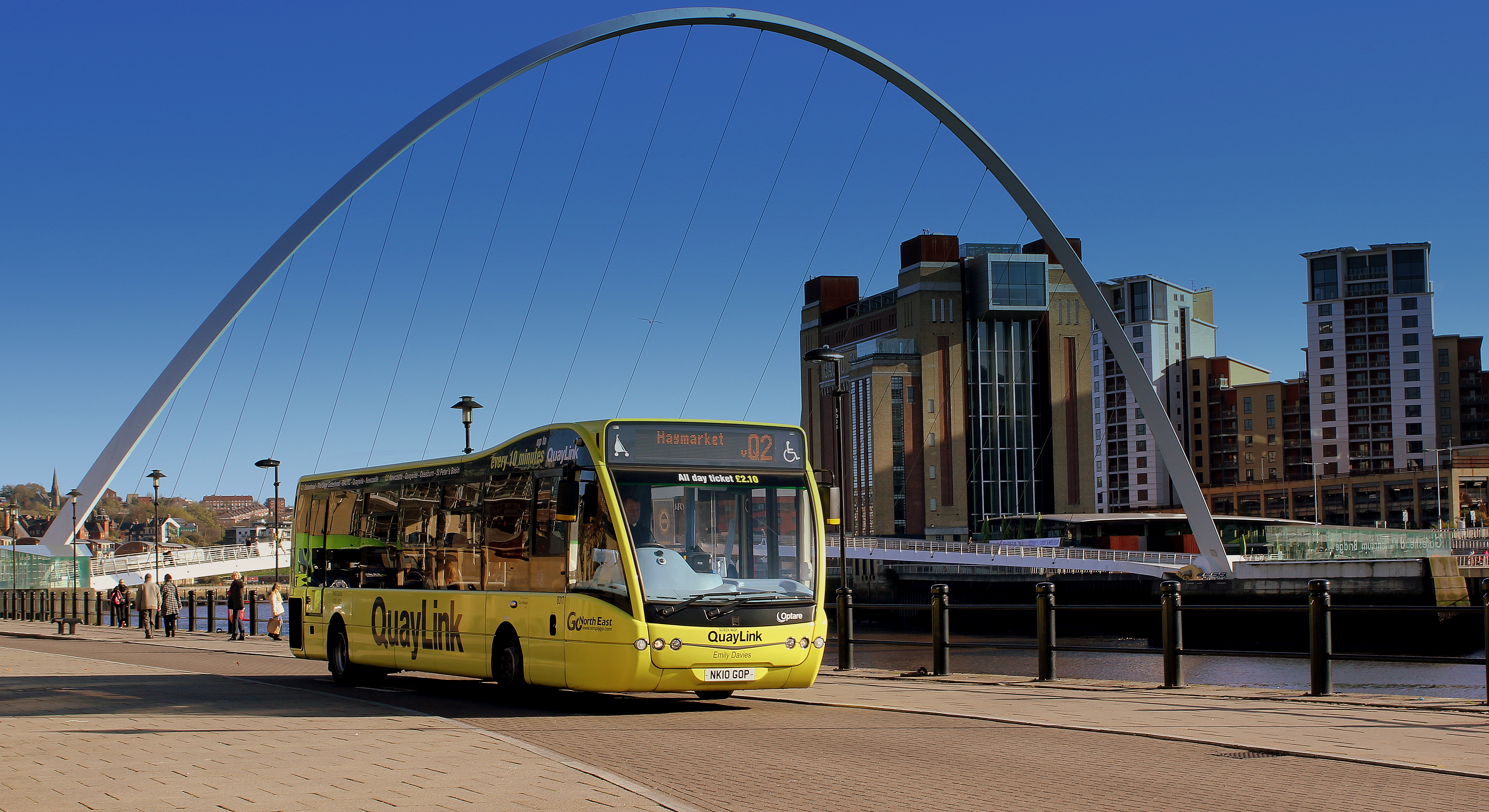
A Go North East Optare Versa in the second version of the QuayLink livery, seen at Quayside in November 2013.

==== Fleet and operations ====
Prior to the re-awarding of the QuayLink contract by the Tyne and Wear Passenger Transport Executive, it was decided that the service should receive new vehicles, owing to the overall poor reliability of the existing fleet.

In July 2010, Go North East was awarded the five-year contract to operate the services, with operations transferred to the company's Saltmeadows Road depot in Gateshead. The fleet consisted of nine Euro 5 diesel-powered Optare Versa vehicles, which entered service in August 2010. The vehicles provided increased seating capacity, when compared to the former fleet, as well as on-board next stop audio-visual information displays.

In February 2015, operations were later transferred within the company, following the opening of the new Riverside depot in Dunston, Gateshead. Throughout 2017, the fleet was fitted with free on-board WiFi. Contactless payment was trialed on service Q3 in June 2017, and subsequently rolled out across the Go North East network soon thereafter.

By March 2020, there were a total of 23 Optare Versa branded in the QuayLink livery. The vehicles have recently been upgraded to meet Euro 6 emissions standards, ahead of the introduction of Newcastle upon Tyne's Clean Air Zone in the coming months.

==== Service, routes and frequency ====
Under Go North East, the service operated to the same routes and frequency as previously operated by Stagecoach North East. At the end of 2014, it was announced that Gateshead Council and Newcastle City Council would no longer fund QuayLink beyond the end of the contract, due to finish in July 2015. Go North East opted to continue to operate the service on a commercial basis, with minimal funding from the Tyne and Wear Passenger Transport Executive, which itself would also end three years later.

In late July 2015, Go North East relaunched QuayLink, with a new look and significant route changes:

- Q1 was merged with the existing 51 and 52 circular services and renumbered Q1 and Q2. These changes extended QuayLink network to East Gateshead, with the circular route connecting Carr Hill, Felling, Heworth, Leam Lane Estate, Springwell Estate, Wrekenton and Low Fell.
- Q2 was merged with the existing X40 service and renumbered Q3. This extended the network north to Gosforth and Newcastle Great Park. In July 2016, the route was further extended east to Walker and Wallsend.

The relaunched services continued to use the existing QuayLink fleet, in addition to additional Optare Versa vehicles formerly used on the 51 and 52 circular services. A new yellow and purple livery was introduced for the Q1 and Q2, with a yellow and green livery for the Q3.

== Rebranding ==
As of September 2021, the QuayLink brand was discontinued, with most of the previously allocated vehicles repainted and distributed across the Go North East fleet. Services now operate under the QuayCity and VOLTRA names.

=== QuayCity ===
In December 2020, the Q3 service was rebranded QuayCity, running to the previous 15 minute frequency (Monday to Saturday) between Newcastle Great Park and Wallsend, with evening services operating as far as St Peter's Basin only. In March 2022, the service was revised to run via Jesmond (Osborne Road), with the section between St Peter's Basin and Wallsend withdrawn. The service is operated by a fleet of Euro 6 Optare Versa, branded in a yellow and black livery.

=== VOLTRA ===
In September 2021, the Q1 and Q2 service was split, with the section in East Gateshead reverting to operate as circular services 51 and 52. Circular services VOLTRA 53 and 54 were altered to additionally serve the Quayside section of the former Q1 and Q2 routes, running up to every 12 minutes (Monday to Saturday). The service is operated by a fleet of nine fully-electric Yutong E10 buses, branded in a silver and green livery, and also serves Bensham and Saltwell Park.
