= Epimerox =

Names
- IUPAC name (S,E)-2-(4-((5-(3,4-dichlorophenyl)furan-2-yl)methylene)-5-oxo-2-thioxoimidazolidin-1-yl)-3-phenylpropanoic acid

Identifiers
3D model (JSmol)	Interactive image
ChEMBL	ChEMBL3099046
ChemSpider	31128636
PubChem CID	57994048
- InChI: InChI=1S/C23H16Cl2N2O4S/c24-16-8-6-14(11-17(16)25)20-9-7-15(31-20)12-18-21(28)27(23(32)26-18)19(22(29)30)10-13-4-2-1-3-5-13/h1-9,11-12,19H,10H2,(H,26,32)(H,29,30)/b18-12+ Key: CZUADNIMRCRNSB-LDADJPATSA-N
- SMILES: Clc1ccc(cc1Cl)-c(cc4)oc4\C=C(/C2=O)\NC(=S)N2C(C(O)=O)Cc3ccccc3

Properties
Chemical formula	C_{23}H_{16}Cl_{2}N_{2}O_{4}S
Molar mass	487.35 g·mol^{−1}
- Except where otherwise noted, data are given for materials in their standard state (at 25 °C [77 °F], 100 kPa). Infobox references

Epimerox

Names
- IUPAC name (S,E)-2-(4-((5-(3-bromophenyl)thiophene-2-yl)methylene)-5-oxo-2-thioxoimidazolidin-1-yl)-3-phenylpropanoic acid

Identifiers
3D model (JSmol)	Interactive image
ChEMBL	ChEMBL3099318
ChemSpider	31124510
PubChem CID	57994051
- InChI: InChI=1S/C23H17BrN2O3S2/c24-16-8-6-15(7-9-16)20-11-10-17(31-20)13-18-21(27)26(23(30)25-18)19(22(28)29)12-14-4-2-1-3-5-14/h1-11,13,19H,12H2,(H,25,30)(H,28,29)/b18-13+ Key: FVHHZLXFIYKOPG-QGOAFFKASA-N
- SMILES: Brc4ccc(cc4)-c2ccc(s2)\C=C(/C1=O)\NC(=S)N1C(C(=O)O)Cc3ccccc3

Properties
Chemical formula	C_{23}H_{17}BrN_{2}O_{3}S_{2}
Molar mass	513.42 g·mol^{−1}
- Except where otherwise noted, data are given for materials in their standard state (at 25 °C [77 °F], 100 kPa). Infobox references

Epimerox is an experimental broad-spectrum antibiotic compound being developed by scientists at the Rockefeller University and Astex Pharmaceuticals. It is a small molecule inhibitor compound that blocks the activity of the enzyme UDP-N-acetylglucosamine 2-epimerase, an epimerase enzyme that is called 2-epimerase for short.

== Mechanism of action ==
2-Epimerase converts UDP-N-acetyl-D-glucosamine to UDP-N-acetyl-D-mannosamine. Bacterial 2-epimerase differs from its human counterpart in that the bacterial molecule has an allosteric site. For enzymatic activity, the allosteric site needs to be occupied by the substrate UDP-N-acetylglucosamine; this is the first enzyme described in which the substrate is present in both the catalytic and allosteric sites. Because epimerox targets the allosteric site of the bacterial 2-epimerase, low human toxicity is expected since the human 2-epimerase does not have this site.

Although epimerox was originally developed specifically to target Bacillus anthracis, the bacterium that causes anthrax, it was found that it is also effective against methicillin-resistant Staphylococcus aureus (MRSA), and many other Gram-positive bacteria.

No bacteria could be identified that were resistant to the compound (resistance frequency of <10^{−11}). Thus, epimerox is an antibiotic with low resistance potential. Therefore, 2-epimerase is a new antibiotic target to which resistance is a rare event. 2-Epimerase was discovered as a target because it was one of the enzymes in the biosynthetic pathway for synthesizing an essential neutral polysaccharide in the cell wall of B. anthracis (Glu:Gal-NAc:Man-NAc at a 3:2:1 ratio). This polysaccharide is only found in B. anthracis and is the receptor for a bacteriophage lysin enzyme called PlyG, which is produced by the γ-bacteriophage to release its progeny from infected B. anthracis. For bacteriophage to survive they need to replicate inside a bacterial cell and release their progeny phage when they are assembled using their lysin. Since lysins from bacteriophage that infect Gram-positive bacteria must bind to a cell wall receptor to function, the enzymes have evolved over a billion years to identify substrate receptors in the bacterial cell wall that the bacteria cannot change easily. These substrates are either part of the peptidoglycan or sugars linked to it. Deletion of both 2-epimerase genes in B. anthracis is lethal to the bacterium.

== Chemistry ==
Epimerox is the name of two chemically closely related compounds that were found to block 2-epimerase and act as antibiotics by the described mechanism. Both are thiohydantoin derivatives of the amino acid phenylalanine. They differ in the residue on the thiohydantoin's carbon atom, which is (E)-5-(3,4-dichlorophenyl)furan-2-ylmethylene in one compound and (E)-5-(3-bromophenyl)thiophene-2-ylmethylene in the other.

=== Synthesis ===
The last step of the epimerox synthesis, a Knoevenagel condensation

The substances are prepared via a Knoevenagel condensation of a thiohydantoin–phenylalanine imine with different aldehydes, which yields a mixture of E and Z isomers. The active compounds are the E forms.
