= Yutong E10 =

Chinese battery electric single-decker bus

Yutong E10 Yutong E12
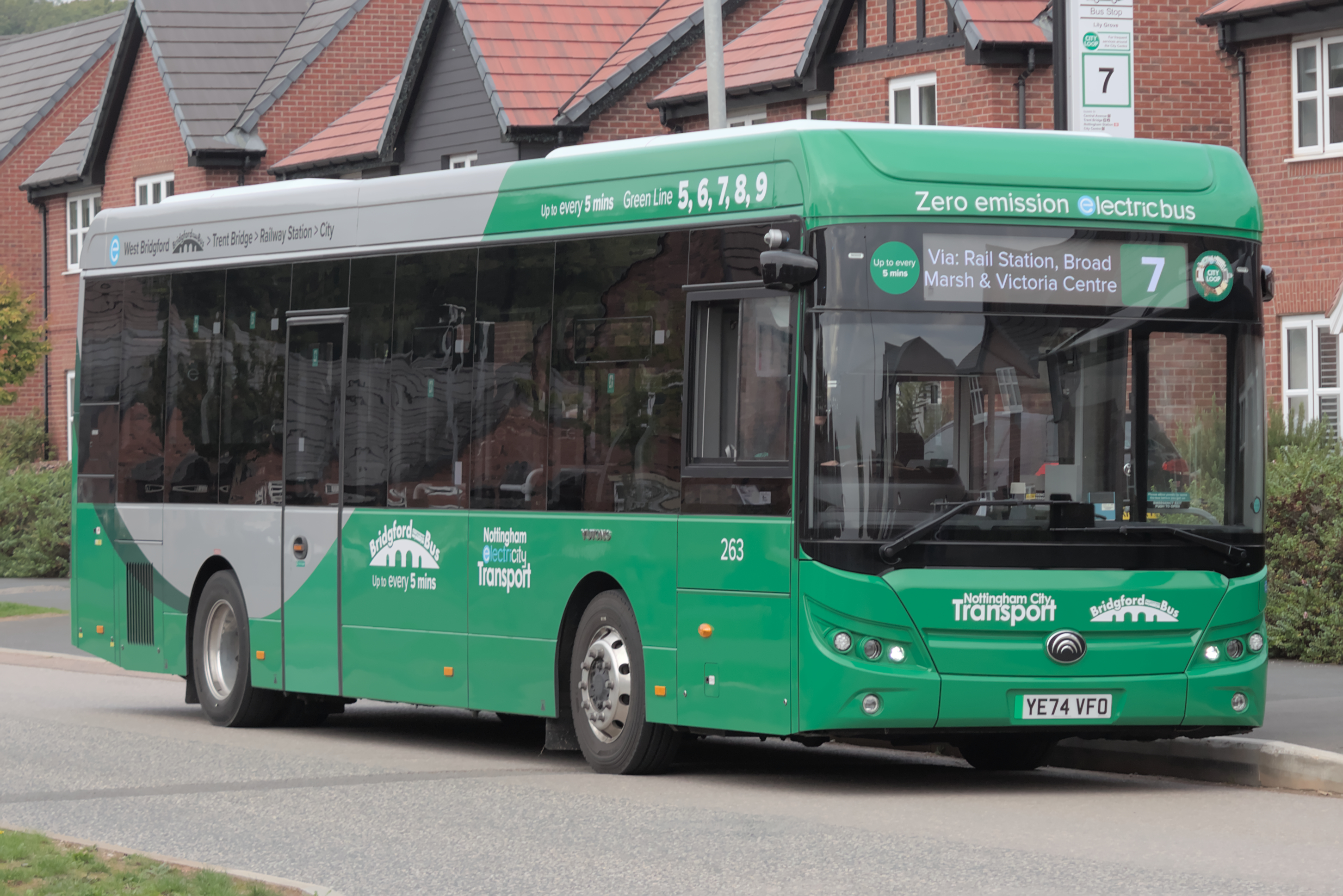
- A Nottingham City Transport Yutong E10 in Nottingham, England in October 2025

Overview
- Manufacturer: Yutong
- Production: 2016–
- Assembly: Zhengzhou, China

Body and chassis
- Class: Electric bus
- Doors: 1, 2 or 3
- Floor type: Low floor

Powertrain
- Capacity: 34 seated, 36 standing
- Power output: 215 kW electric motor
- Battery: 350 or 422 kWh lithium iron phosphate
- Range: 370 kilometres (230 mi)

Dimensions
- Length: E10; 10.9 metres (36 ft); E12; 12.2 metres (40 ft)
- Width: 2,500 millimetres (8.2 ft)
- Height: 3,285 millimetres (10.778 ft)
- Curb weight: E10; 13,200 kilograms (13.2 t); E12; 13,750 kilograms (13.75 t)

The Yutong E10, also sold as the longer Yutong E12, is a battery electric single-decker bus manufactured by Yutong in Zhengzhou since 2016 for both Chinese and international bus operators.

The Yutong E10 debuted in China in 2016, transporting delegates to meetings of the National People's Congress in Beijing.

== Design ==
Both the Yutong E10 and Yutong E12 are powered by a 215 kW electric motor capable of producing 3,500 newton-metres (2,600 lbf⋅ft) of torque. The buses carry twelve liquid-cooled lithium iron phosphate batteries with a maximum charging capacity of 422 kWh, allowing for a maximum range of 370 kilometres (230 mi) on a single charge. There is also an option for a smaller 350 kWh battery. Regenerative braking can also be used to extend the range of the bus by up to 40%. Both buses use ZF front and rear axles, the former using an independent suspension, as well as ZF electro-hydraulic power steering. The buses use an Electronically Controlled Air Suspension (ECAS) consisting of airbags in the front and rear of the bus, in addition to ZF SACHS shock absorbers.

In the United Kingdom, both buses can carry 70 passengers, with the E10 carrying 35 seated and 36 standing passengers and the E12 carrying 39 seated and 31 standing passengers. Wheelchair access is provided on both buses as standard.

== Operators ==
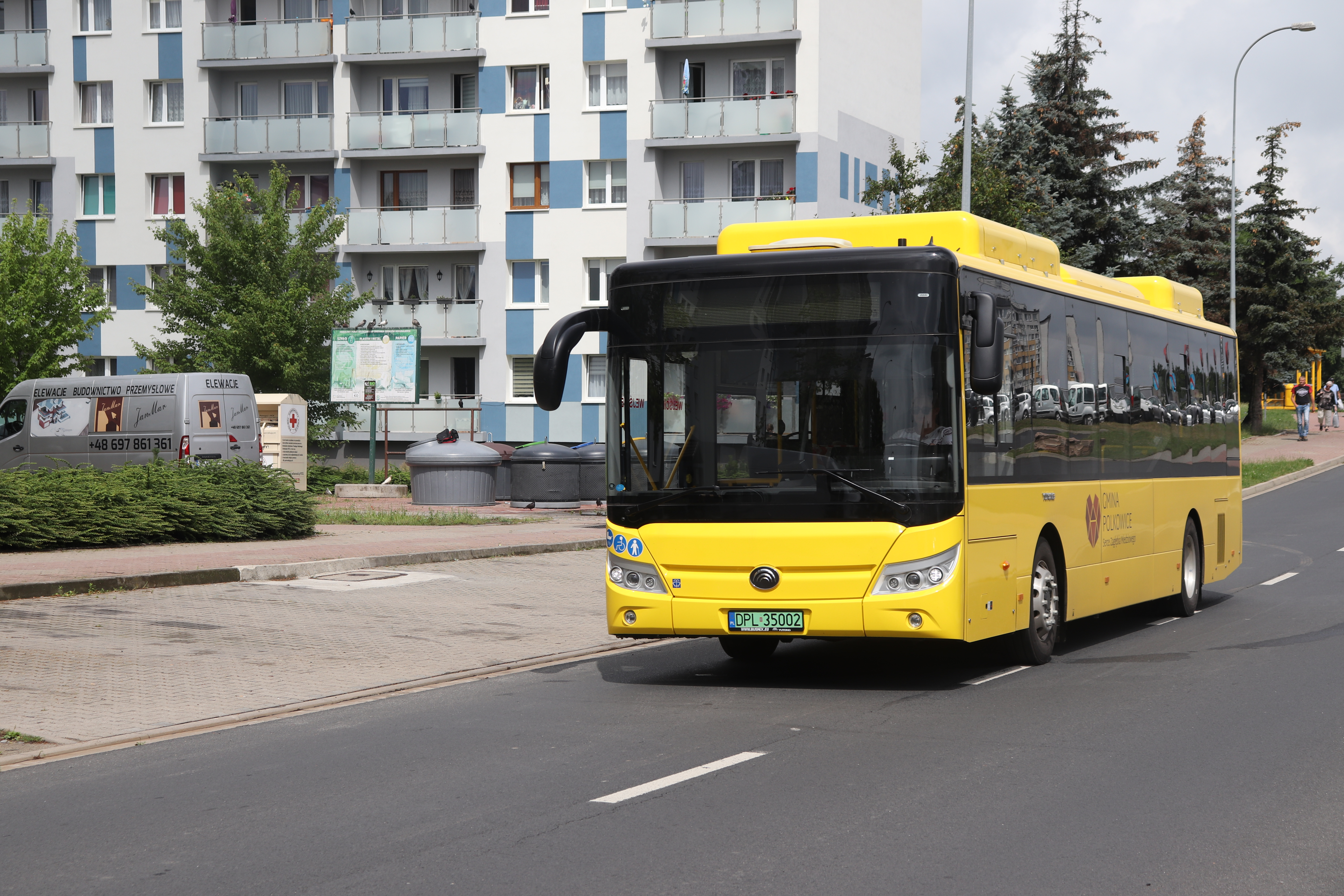
A Yutong E10 in Polkowice, Poland

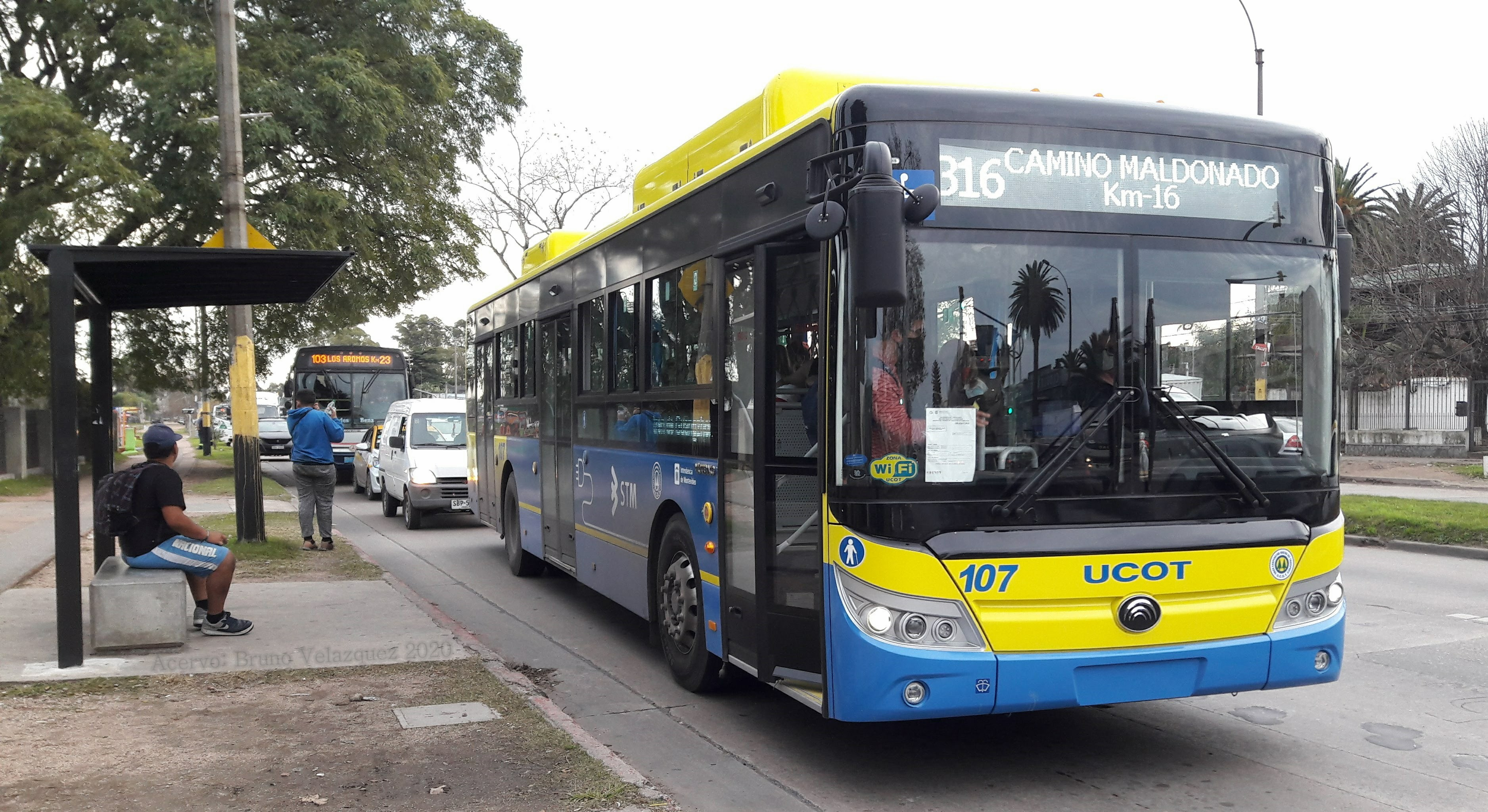
A Yutong E12 in Montevideo, Uruguay

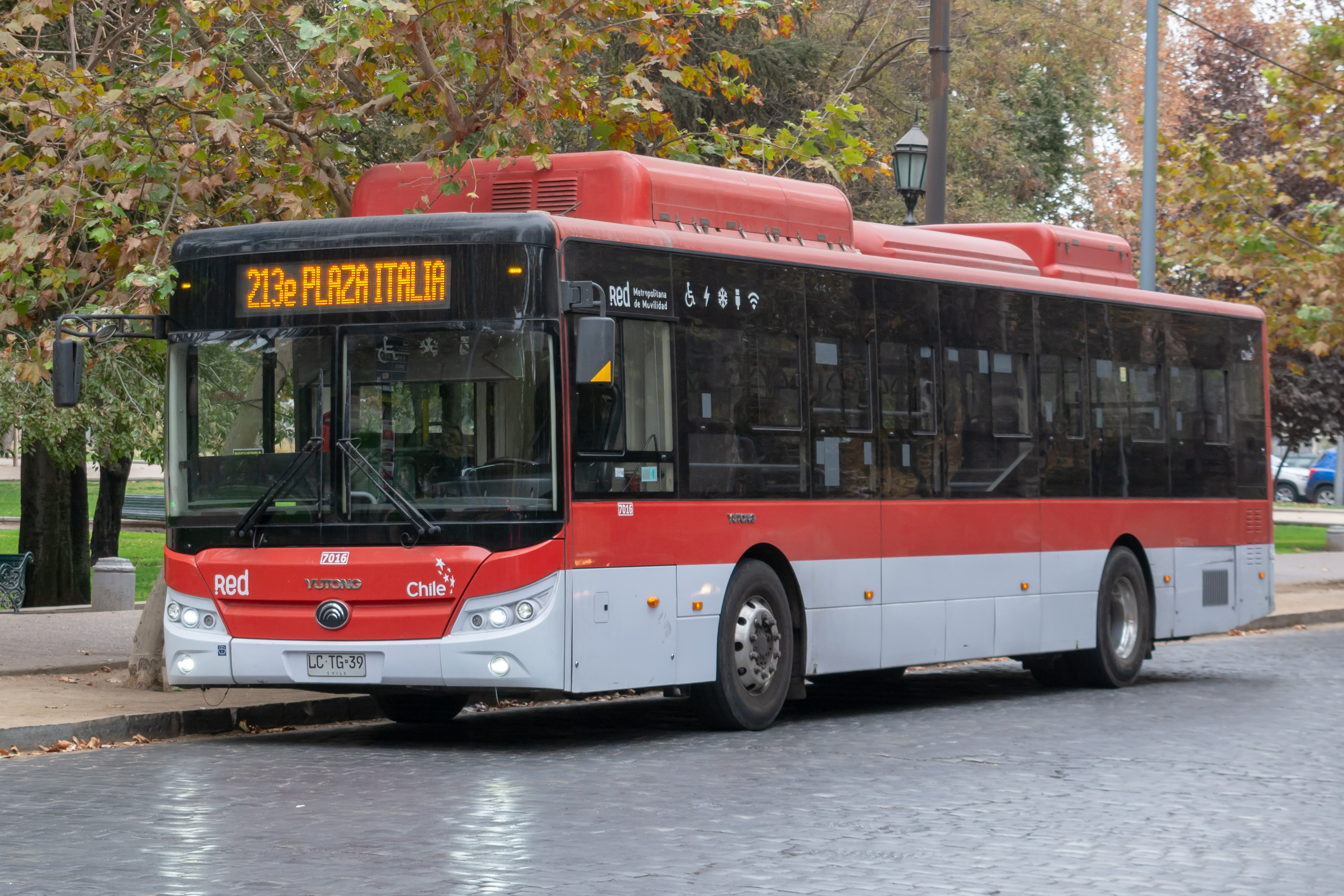
A Red Metropolitana de Movilidad Yutong E12 in Santiago, Chile

=== Nordic Countries ===
The Yutong E12 is popular in the Nordic countries. The city of Roskilde in Denmark received its first Yutong buses in 2019, replacing its diesel bus fleet with 20 E12s. The cities of Copenhagen and Odense in Denmark, as well as Bergen in Norway, who all have bus services run by Keolis soon followed, with each city receiving deliveries of Yutong E12s throughout 2020 and 2021; an E12 demonstrator was trialled by Keolis in the French city of Orléans in 2017, however no orders have since resulted in France. 14 Yutong E12s were also delivered for service in Iceland's capital city of Reykjavík in November 2018, while 35 E12s were delivered to both the Finnish capital of Helsinki and neighbouring Kerava in 2019.

=== Eastern Europe ===
In Poland, nine E10s were delivered to the city of Polkowice in 2021, twelve E12s were delivered to the city of Łomża in 2022, and 20 E12s have been ordered by the city of Białystok. Another 20 E12s are in service also in Jelenia Góra. E12s have also been delivered to Bulgaria, with 20 E12s delivered to the capital Sofia in December 2018 and 14 delivered to Pleven in December 2021, enabling the latter to be Bulgaria's first city with an all-electric bus fleet. 250 Yutong E12s are set to enter service in the Greek cities of Athens and Thessaloniki from Spring 2024 as the first of 1,300 electric buses planned to be operated across the country.

=== South America ===
100 Yutong E12s were ordered for bus operators in Santiago de Chile in 2018, as part of a scheme seeking to electrify the city's bus network by 2050, while in Uruguay, as part of a scheme to begin replacing 150 diesel buses in the capital Montevideo, ten Yutong E12s were delivered to operators across the city in April 2020: four E12s were delivered to COETC, three were delivered to COMESA and another three were delivered to UCOT.

=== Singapore ===
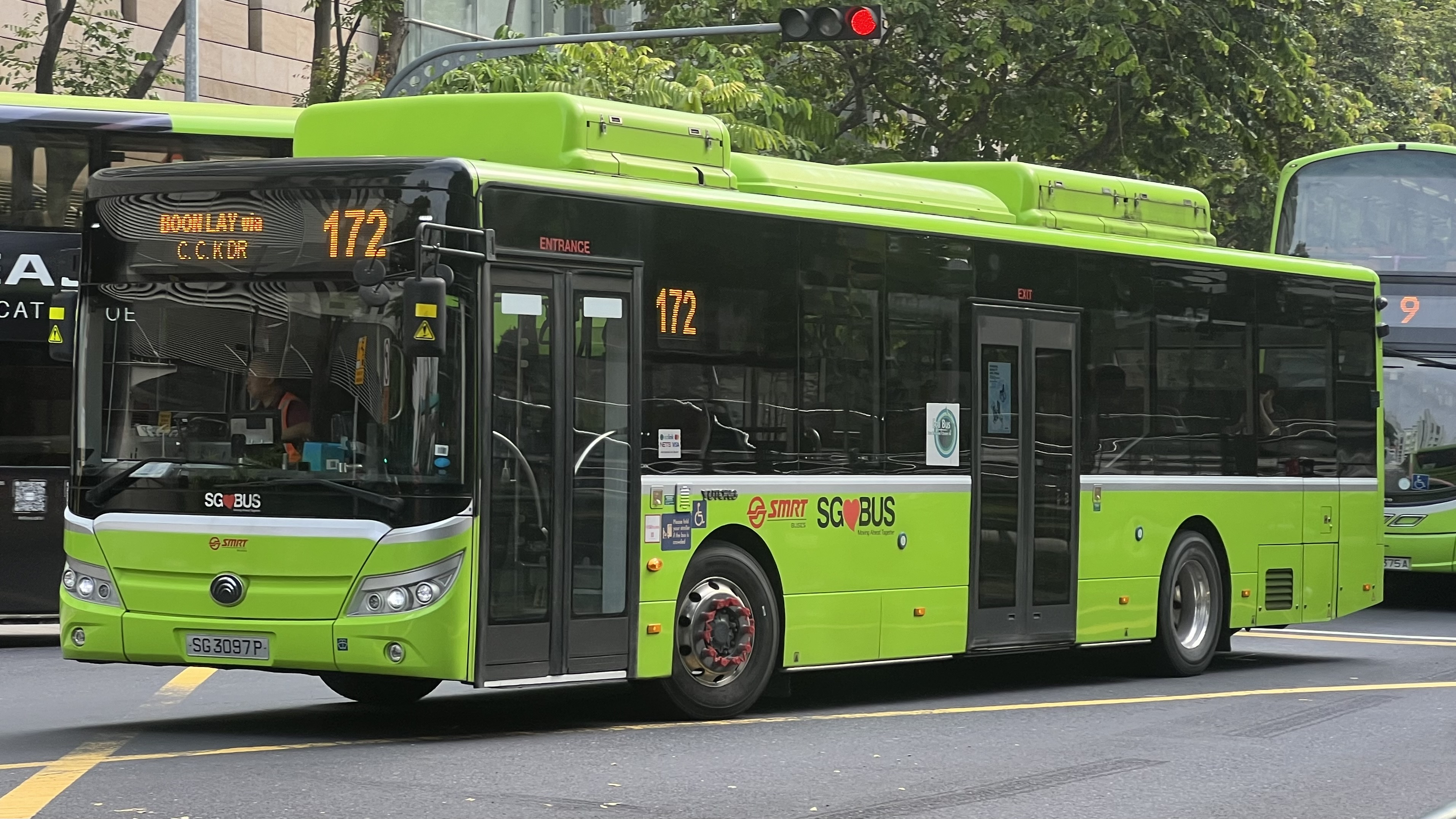
A SMRT Buses Yutong E12

In Singapore, the Land Transport Authority took delivery of ten E12s alongside a fleet of ten double deck E12DDs in April 2020, part of an order of 60 electric buses from 3 different manufacturers for the country.

=== Oceania ===
In Australia, the Yutong E12 has proven popular with many bus operators nationwide who opted to trial the vehicle. Nine Yutong E12s were delivered to Interline Bus Services from April 2021, a small fleet was delivered to Transit Systems NSW, and eight E12s began entering service with ACTION of Canberra from February 2023, followed by a further 90 E12s in June 2023. E12s were also ordered by New Zealand operator Go Bus Transport, with nine delivered to Auckland for its AirportLink services serving Auckland Airport in January 2021 and an additional three delivered for services in Christchurch later in the year, followed by the delivery of eleven E10s to Ritchies Transport for city services in Dunedin in early 2024.

=== United Kingdom ===
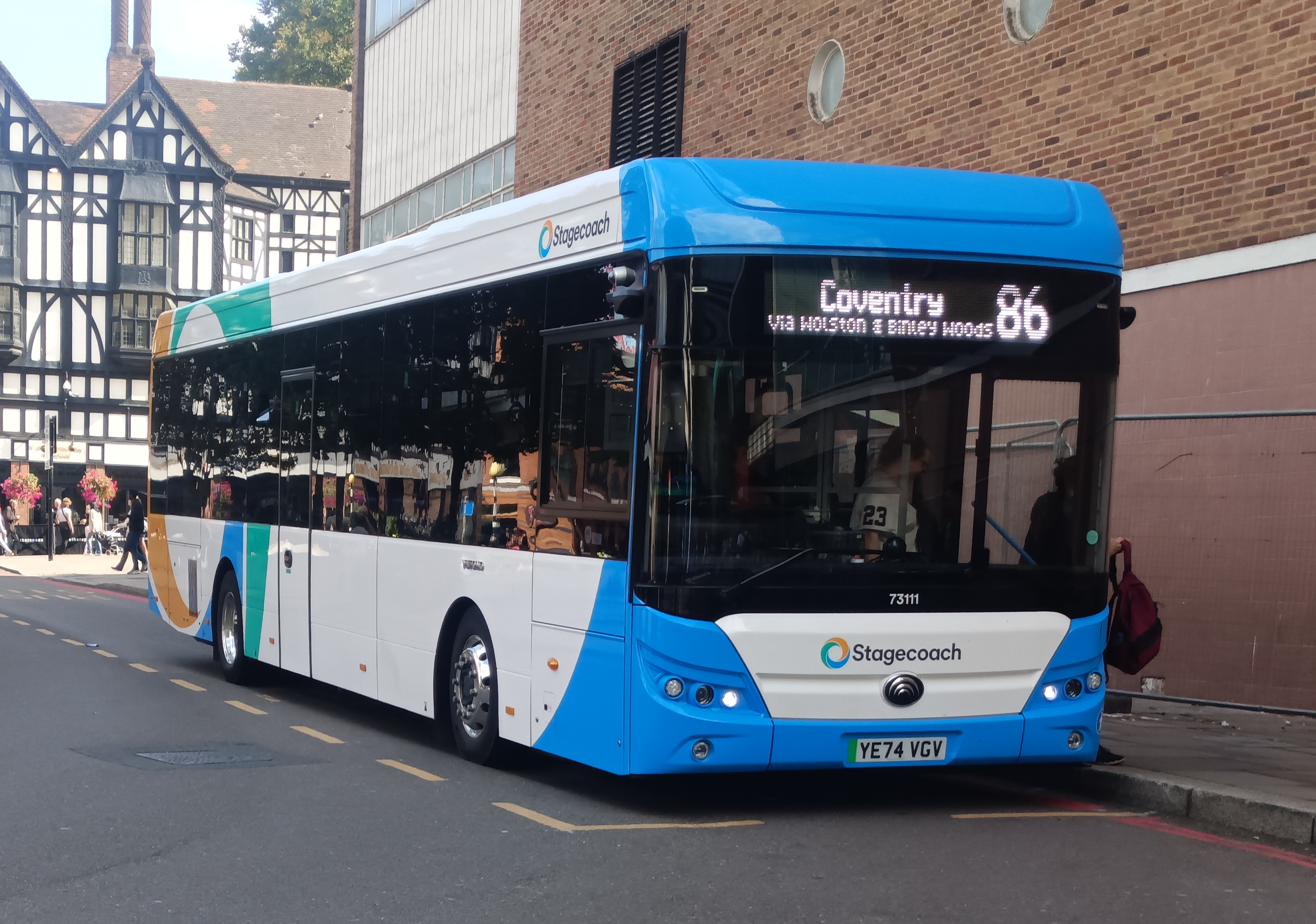
A Stagecoach Midlands Yutong E12 in Coventry, England

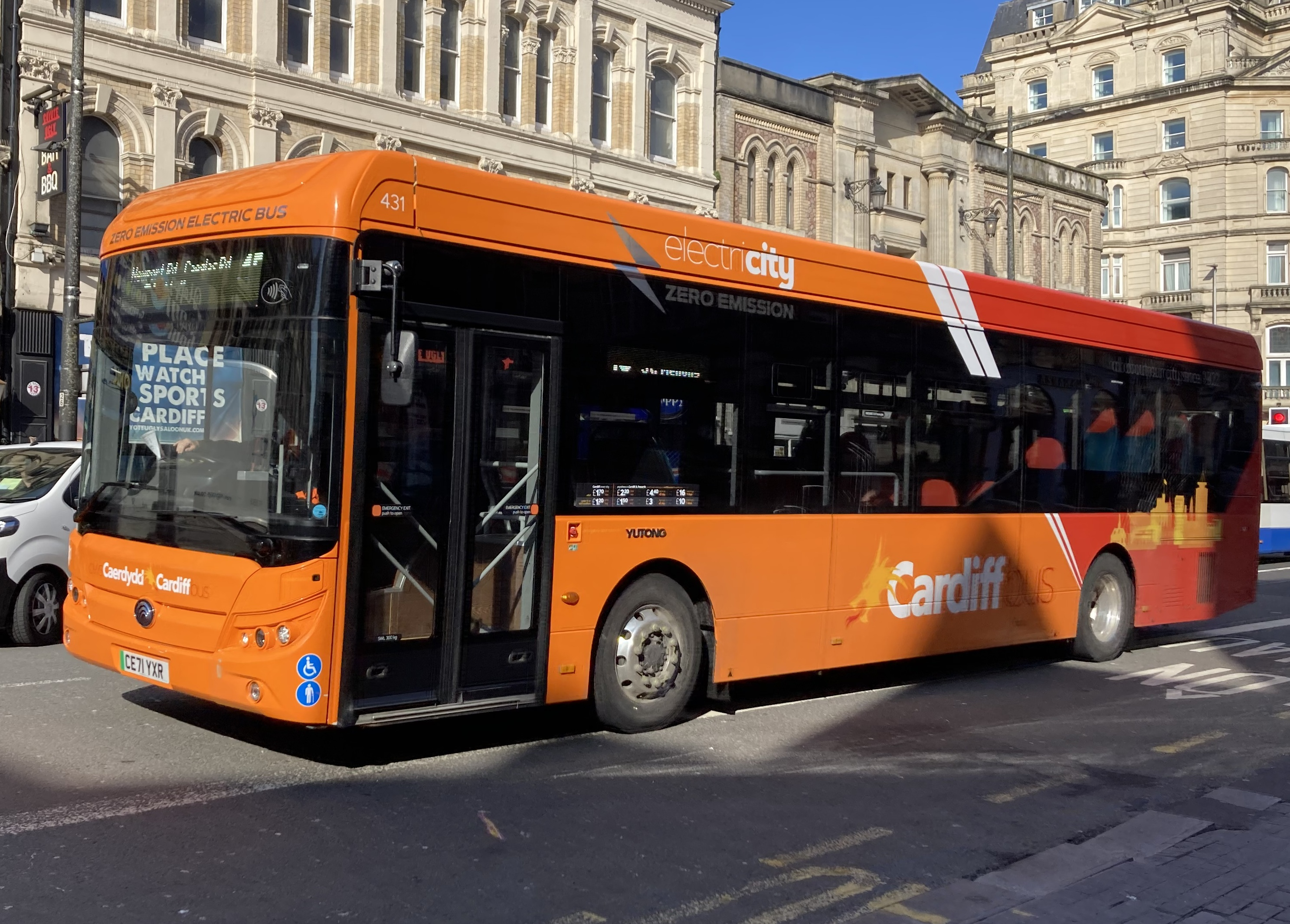
A Cardiff Bus Yutong E12 in Cardiff, Wales

Yutong E10s and E12s, as well as other Yutong products, have been sold in the United Kingdom through the Pelican Bus dealership in Castleford since 2018, where a new showroom and workshop for the final assembly and technical support of Yutong buses and coaches opened in January 2023. The company is also partnered with battery supplier Zenobe, who assist in installing charging infrastructure and providing new batteries for electric bus operators.

The first ten Yutong E10s ordered for the United Kingdom market entered service with Go North East in November 2020. These Yutongs were branded as Voltra buses for services on routes 53 and 54 between Newcastle upon Tyne and Gateshead, with the launch preceded by a major marketing campaign by Go North East, and were delivered with high-specification interiors and exterior LED lighting designed by Best Impressions. Go North East would subsequently take delivery of nine E12s delivered to Voltra specification for use on the QuayCity Q3 service in September 2022. Nine E10s were also delivered to First Leeds in 2020, entering service on a route serving the Halton Moor district of Leeds in October; a further 31 began to be delivered to First Essex's Basildon depot during September 2025, with 20 more to be delivered to First West of England's Hengrove and Weston-super-Mare depots and The Buses of Somerset's Taunton depot during 2025.

In Leicester, fifteen E12s were ordered by Leicester City Council, with eleven delivered to Roberts Travel Group in February 2021 for use on the city's park & ride services and the remaining four delivered to Centrebus in June 2022 for 'Hospital Hopper' services to the University Hospitals of Leicester. Centrebus would subsequently take delivery of six E10s in October 2022, the first zero-emissions buses to be delivered through a Department for Transport-funded Zero Emission Bus Regional Areas (ZEBRA) scheme, for use on its 'Orbital' network across Leicester; a further fourteen electric buses are planned to be delivered for this service. A fleet of 24 E12s entered service with Nottingham City Transport in April 2024 as part of the electrification of the operator's single-deck fleet, and the first 24 of a further batch of 38 E10s and E12s began entering service at the operator's Trent Bridge garage in February 2025, with the remainder delivered in late 2025; a further batch of seven E12s were ordered in May 2026 for delivery by April 2027.

A Transport Canberra Yutong e12 in the rain

The Stagecoach Group first took delivery of 25 Yutong E10s for their Stagecoach Highlands in early 2023 for use in Inverness. 23 E12s with pantograph chargers entered service with Stagecoach Yorkshire in May 2024 for services in Barnsley, Doncaster and Rotherham, and 20 E12s were delivered to Stagecoach North East in Sunderland in January 2025, part of an order for E12s to be delivered to Slatyford and Stockton-on-Tees during 2025. Stagecoach announced in June 2024 that it had ordered further E10s and E12s for distribution to Stagecoach East Midlands in Chesterfield and Stagecoach Merseyside and South Lancashire in Preston, with the buses set to be delivered to these subsidiaries between July 2024 and early 2025. 60 E10s and E12s from this order began to be delivered to Stagecoach Midlands' depots in Rugby, Leamington Spa and Nuneaton from June 2025 onwards, and a further order for twelve E10s to Stagecoach South West for use in Torbay was announced in March 2025. Ten Yutong E10s were additionally delivered to Stagecoach East Midlands during summer 2026.

Shortly before the 2021 United Nations Climate Change Conference in Glasgow, Scottish bus operator McGill's Bus Services received 55 E12s, which were followed by 41 more of the type, 31 of these being E12s and the remaining ten being McGill's first short E10s, in March 2023. A further 30 E12s were delivered to McGill's Midland Bluebird division during 2025. Elsewhere in Scotland, First Aberdeen took delivery of 24 E12s for delivery in early 2023, all entering service with the operator in July 2023, with some of the buses initially loaned to First Glasgow.

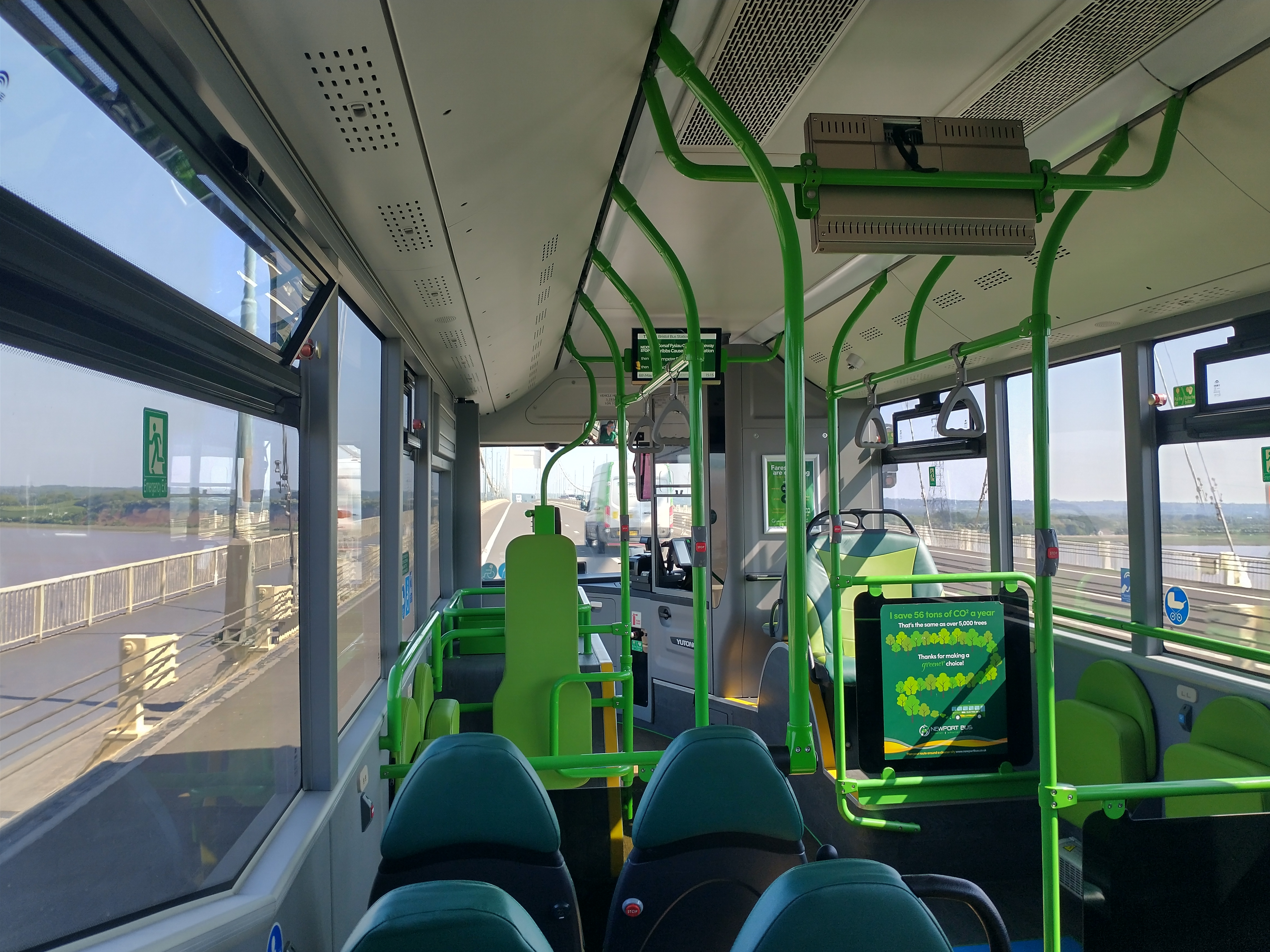
Front interior of a Newport Bus Yutong E10 on the Severn Bridge in 2025

In Wales, after purchasing a demonstrator vehicle from Yutong in 2019, Newport Bus ordered 14 E12s in 2020, the first electric buses to be purchased by a Welsh bus operator. Further deliveries of Yutong E12s as well as E10s between 2022 and 2023 would take Newport's total fleet of Yutong electric buses to 44 by May 2023. E12s also entered service with Cardiff Bus in December 2021, with 36 being delivered with special branding for routes around Cardiff; an E12 from this batch was painted into a heritage livery celebrating 120 years of public transport in the Welsh capital. Eight E12s were delivered for the electrification of the TrawsCymru T1 service serving Aberystwyth and Carmarthen in March 2023, while six E12s were delivered in 2021 for use on the T22 service, serving Caernarfon and Blaenau Ffestiniog via Porthmadog, however their entry into service with Llew Jones Coaches was delayed to February 2024 due to the lack of a bus depot with charging infrastructure to house the buses; some of these E12s were also scheduled to enter service on the T19 service between Blaenau Ffestiniog and Llandudno, however during the delay, the T19 ceased operations on 11 February 2023.

Smaller operators of Yutong E10s on closed-door contract services include Passenger Plus of Tadworth, who took delivery of four E10s for use on a corporate staff shuttle between Feltham railway station in west London and Sunbury-on-Thames, Scottish Power, who took delivery of a single seatbelted E10 in December 2020, the first such bus to enter service in Scotland, to transporting visitors to the visitor centre of the Whitelee Wind Farm, Stagecoach Midlands, who took delivery of a single E10 in July 2021 for use on a National Grid employee shuttle contract between Leamington Spa and the company's Warwick Technology Park headquarters, and CT4N of Nottingham, who took delivery of two for use on a shuttle service to the East Midlands Gateway. Transdev Airport Services took delivery of 17 of the UK's first Yutong E12s built to dual-door configuration in December 2023, commencing operations on airside shuttle services at Heathrow Airport in February 2024.

== Incidents ==
In Italy, three Yutong E12 buses operated by La Linea s.p.a. in the Mestre borough of Venice have been involved in three distinct incidents, one of which was fatal. The first incident occurred in on 16 June 2023, and according to the driver's statement, was a result of unresponsive brakes. No casualties were reported in this occurrence. The second incident took place on 3 October 2023, when the bus fell off a viaduct, resulting in 21 deaths and 15 injuries. On 14 October 2023, another bus from the company collided with the pillar of a building, causing 13 injuries. At present, all La Linea company bus services are temporarily suspended, and investigations into the second and third accidents are underway.

== See also ==
- List of buses
