= UDP-N-acetylglucosamine 2-epimerase =

Class of enzymes

Identifiers
- EC no.: 5.1.3.14
- CAS no.: 9037-71-2

Databases
- BRENDA: enzyme data
- ExPASy: NiceZyme view
- KEGG: enzyme entry
- MetaCyc: metabolic pathway
- Rhea: reactions
- PDB structures: RCSB PDB PDBe PDBsum
- Gene Ontology: AmiGO / QuickGO
Search
- PMC: articles
- PubMed: articles
- NCBI: proteins

UDP-N-acetylglucosamine 2-epimerase
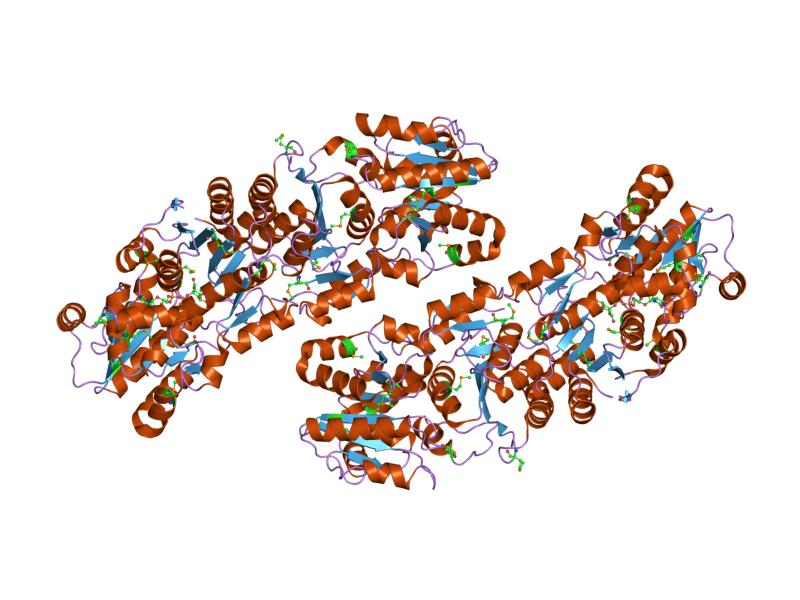
- crystal structure of udp-n-acetylglucosamine_2 epimerase

Identifiers
- Symbol: Epimerase_2
- Pfam: PF02350
- Pfam clan: CL0113
- InterPro: IPR003331
- SCOP2: 1f6d / SCOPe / SUPFAM
- CDD: cd03786
Available protein structures:
- PDB: IPR003331 PF02350 (ECOD; PDBsum)
- AlphaFold: IPR003331; PF02350

In enzymology, an UDP-N-acetylglucosamine 2-epimerase (Note: Not to be confused with N-acetylglucosamine 2-epimerase) (EC 5.1.3.14) is an enzyme that catalyzes the chemical reaction

UDP-N-acetyl-D-glucosamine $\rightleftharpoons$ UDP-N-acetyl-D-mannosamine

Hence, this enzyme has one substrate, UDP-N-acetyl-D-glucosamine, and one product, UDP-N-acetyl-D-mannosamine.

This enzyme belongs to the family of isomerases, specifically those racemases and epimerases acting on carbohydrates and derivatives. The systematic name of this enzyme class is UDP-N-acetyl-D-glucosamine 2-epimerase. Other names in common use include UDP-N-acetylglucosamine 2'-epimerase, uridine diphosphoacetylglucosamine 2'-epimerase, uridine diphospho-N-acetylglucosamine 2'-epimerase, and uridine diphosphate-N-acetylglucosamine-2'-epimerase. This enzyme participates in aminosugars metabolism.

In microorganisms this epimerase is involved in the synthesis of the capsule precursor UDP-ManNAcA. An inhibitor of the bacterial 2-epimerase, epimerox, has been described. Some of these enzymes are bifunctional. The UDP-N-acetylglucosamine 2-epimerase from rat liver displays both epimerase and kinase activity.

== Structural studies ==
As of late 2007, 4 structures have been solved for this class of enzymes, with PDB accession codes PDB: 1F6D, PDB: 1O6C, PDB: 1V4V, and PDB: 1VGV.

== See also ==
- UDP-N-acetylglucosamine 2-epimerase (hydrolysing)
