= Stagecoach North East =

Bus operator in the North East of England

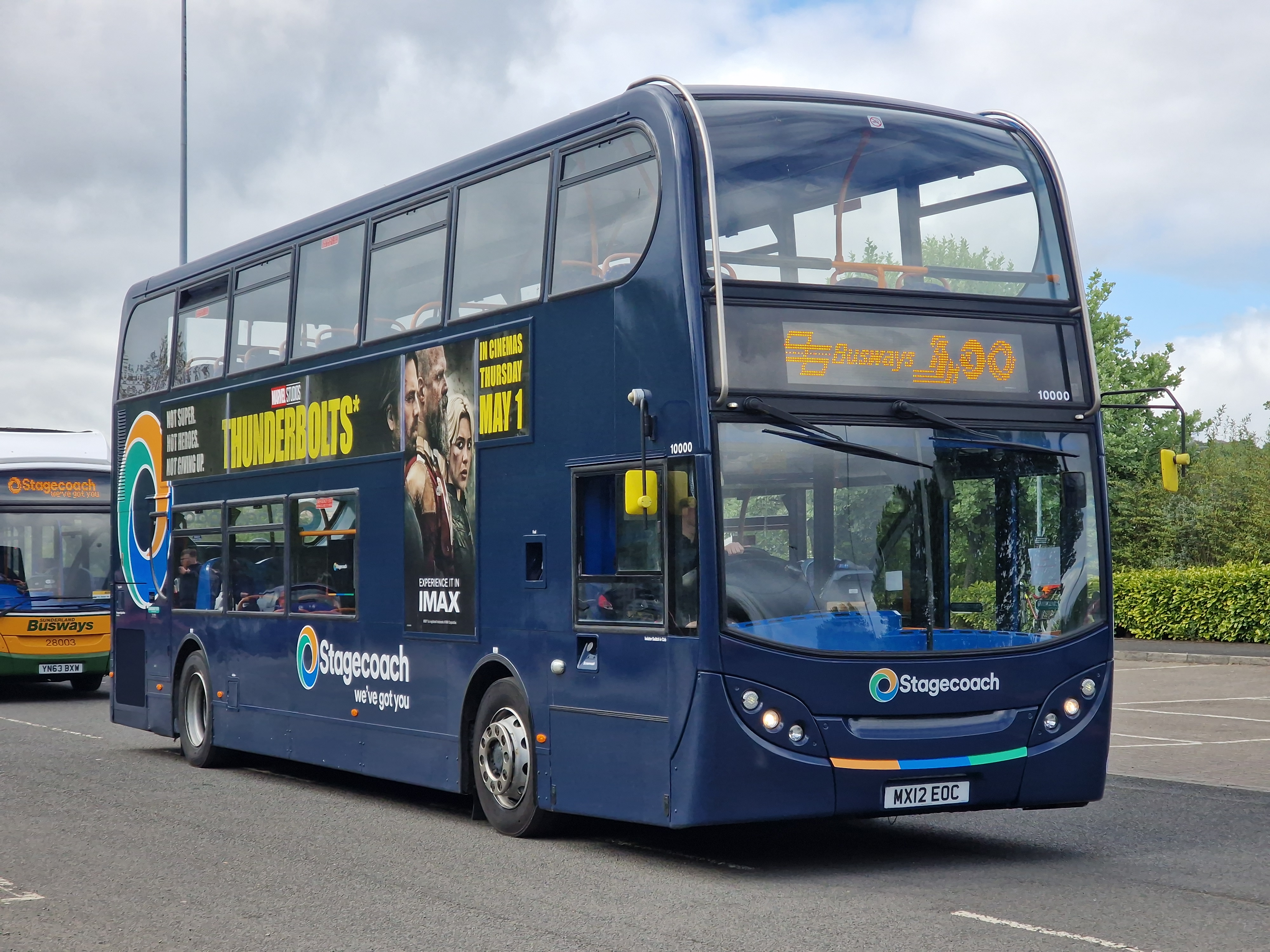
- Alexander Dennis Enviro400 at the MetroCentre in Gateshead in May 2025
- Parent: Stagecoach Group
- Founded: July 1994; 31 years ago
- Headquarters: Sunderland, Tyne and Wear; England
- Service area: County Durham; Cumbria; Northumberland; North Yorkshire; Tyne and Wear
- Service type: Bus and coach
- Depots: 6
- Fleet: 475 (July 2025)
- Website: www.stagecoachbus.com/about/north-east

Stagecoach North East operates both local and regional bus services in County Durham, Cumbria, Northumberland, North Yorkshire and Tyne and Wear, England. It is a subsidiary of the Stagecoach Group, which operates bus, coach, rail and tram services across the United Kingdom.

== History ==
=== 1990s ===
In July 1994, Busways Travel Services was acquired by Stagecoach Group, in a deal valued at £27.5 million. Busways Travel Services Limited is now a holding company for the group's operations in the cities of Newcastle upon Tyne and Sunderland and town of South Shields.

In September 1994, Stagecoach Holdings purchased operator Cleveland Transit for £7.7 million. Cleveland Transit Limited is now a holding company for the group's operations in the towns of Darlington, Hartlepool, Middlesbrough, Redcar and Stockton-on-Tees.

In the same month, the company registered a small network in Darlington, with operations commencing in November 1994. The company became a key participant in the Darlington Bus War. The following month, Stagecoach Holdings acquired Hartlepool Transport. Darlington Transport Company refused to sell to Stagecoach Holdings, with a subsequent inquiry by the Monopolies and Mergers Commission concluding that the actions of Busways were a "contributing factor" in the company's collapse.

=== 2000s ===
In spring 2003, a new depot was opened in Walkergate, at a cost of £6.5 million. It replaced the former depot of Newcastle Corporation Tramways in Byker – the site of which has subsequently been redeveloped.

In July 2005, the company commenced operation of a five-year contract for the QuayLink network of services in Gateshead and Newcastle upon Tyne. Award of the contract saw the introduction of a fleet of ten single-deck Designline Olymbus turbine-electric hybrid buses – a project costing £7.7 million.

In 2007, the first batch of Alexander Dennis Enviro400 double-deckers were delivered to Newcastle, these being part of a £55 million group-wide order.

In August 2007, the group's operations in Darlington were transferred to Arriva North East. Following the takeover, a total of 28 vehicles and 78 drivers were transferred.

=== 2010s ===
In October 2011, a total of 26 double-deck diesel-hybrid Alexander Dennis Enviro400H buses were introduced in Newcastle on high-frequency services 39 and 40. Investment totalled £7.2 million, with £2.2 million from the Government's Green Bus Fund.

From February 2014, a fleet of 40 gas-powered Alexander Dennis Enviro300s were introduced on a series of routes in Sunderland – a project totalling £8 million.

In 2016, 24 Alexander Dennis Enviro400 MMC double-decker buses were delivered for services 62 and 63 (operated by both Slatyford and Walkergate depots), with this delivery allowing for some of the Enviro400s from the original 2007 order to leave the region. A further 23 were delivered for services 39 and 40 in January 2020 which include additional audio-visual next stop announcements with scrolling LED displays, free Wi-Fi and USB charging points. Eighteen Alexander Dennis Enviro200 MMC single-decker buses were also delivered in 2016, these being for routes 30, 31 and 36 (operated by Slatyford depot).

In September 2018, weekend night bus services were introduced on five routes (N1, N30, N39, N40 and N88) in Newcastle upon Tyne. In July 2019, the services were withdrawn due to low usage.

During summer 2019, the company operated The Seasider open-top bus service, which ran between North Shields, Cullercoats, Tynemouth and Whitley Bay. The launch of the coastal service coincided with the end of the company's City Sightseeing franchising agreement in Newcastle upon Tyne.

=== 2020s ===
Between February 2020 and March 2026, the boroughs of Darlington, Hartlepool, Middlesbrough, Redcar and Cleveland and Stockton-on-Tees were served by the Tees Flex demand-responsive network. Initially launched as a three-year project valued at £3 million, passengers could pre-book a bus by app, website or telephone, requesting pick-up and drop-off points within the serviced area, as well as destinations such as hospitals and train stations outside of the area. The network was served by a dedicated fleet of nine 16-seater Mercedes-Benz Sprinter minibuses, branded in a blue livery.

In January 2022, with subsidy from the Tees Valley Combined Authority, Stagecoach launched a service between Middlesbrough and Teesport, which aims to assist with employment opportunities in the area.

In September 2023, Stagecoach returned to Darlington, following the award of the contract for services 6 & 6A, linking Hurworth-on-Tees, Yarm and Stockton-on-Tees with Darlington and Teesside International Airport. The services provide a replacement for Arriva North East's 12 service, which was withdrawn the month prior.

In early-mid 2025, Stagecoach launched over 80 brand new Yutong E12 zero-emission battery-electric buses, for routes E1, E2 and E6 in Sunderland, and to fully electrify their Stockton depot.

== Fleet and operations ==
=== Depots ===
As of February 2026, the company operates from six bus depots across the region: Hartlepool, Slatyford, South Shields, Stockton-on-Tees, Sunderland and Walkergate.

=== Vehicles ===
As of July 2025, the fleet consists of 435 buses. The fleet consists mainly of diesel-powered single and double-deck buses manufactured by Alexander Dennis, as well as zero-emission electric single-deck buses manufactured by Yutong.

== Branding ==
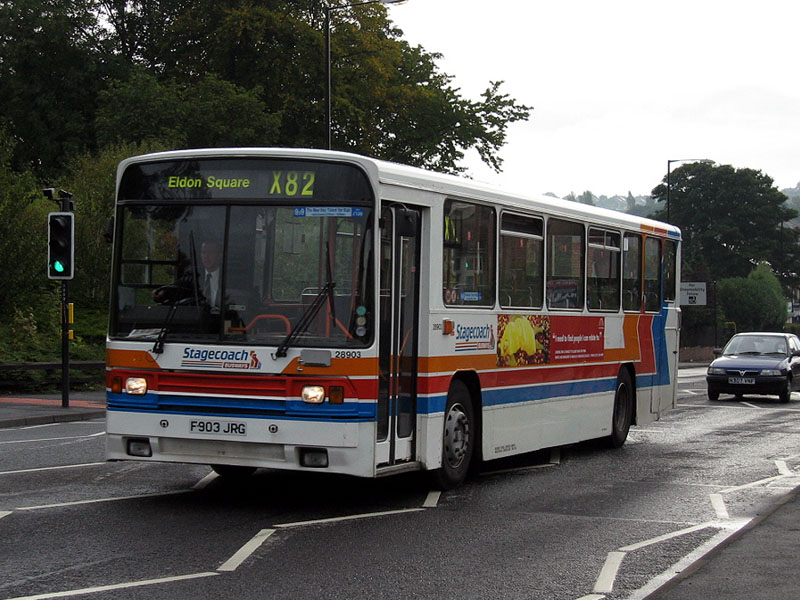
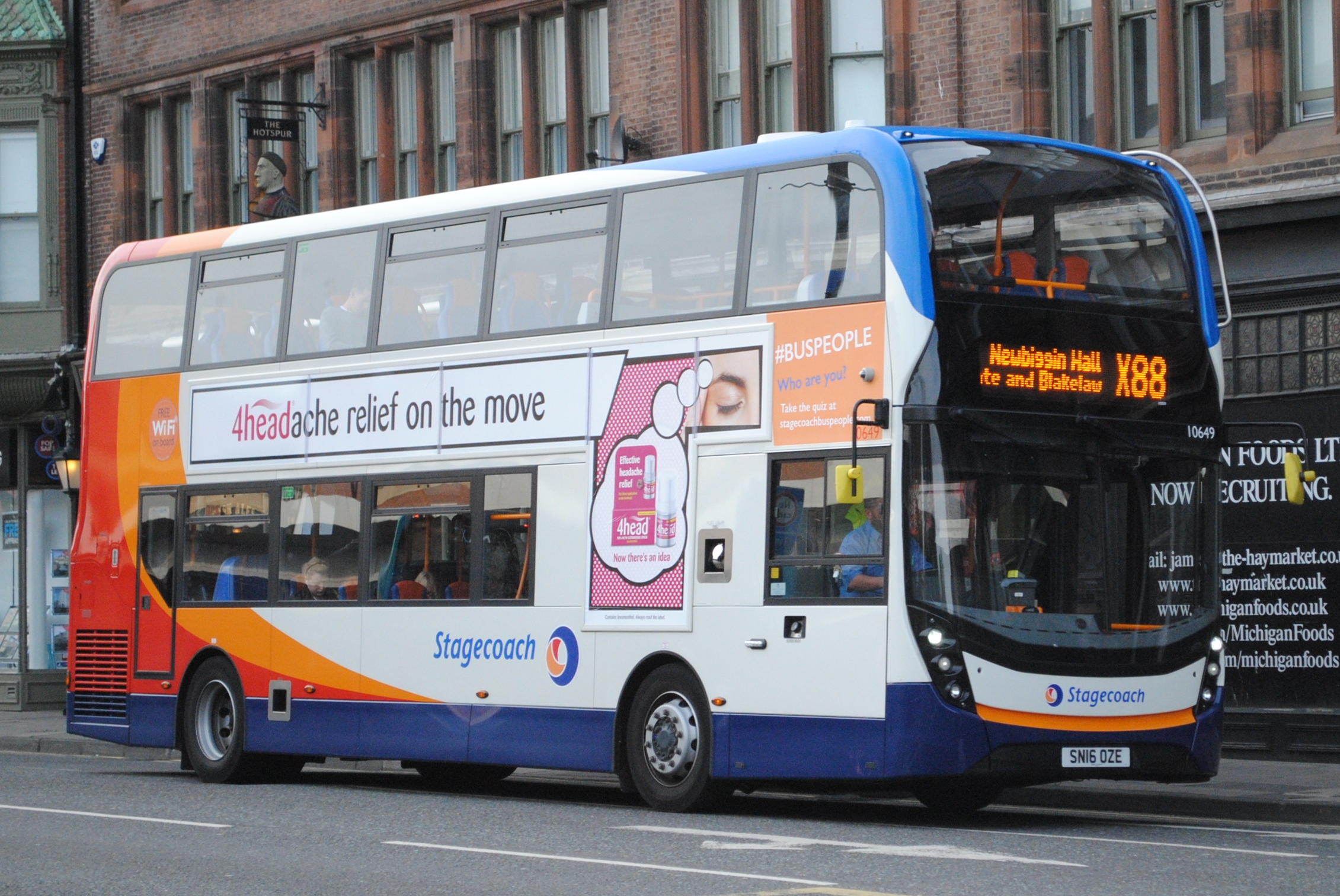
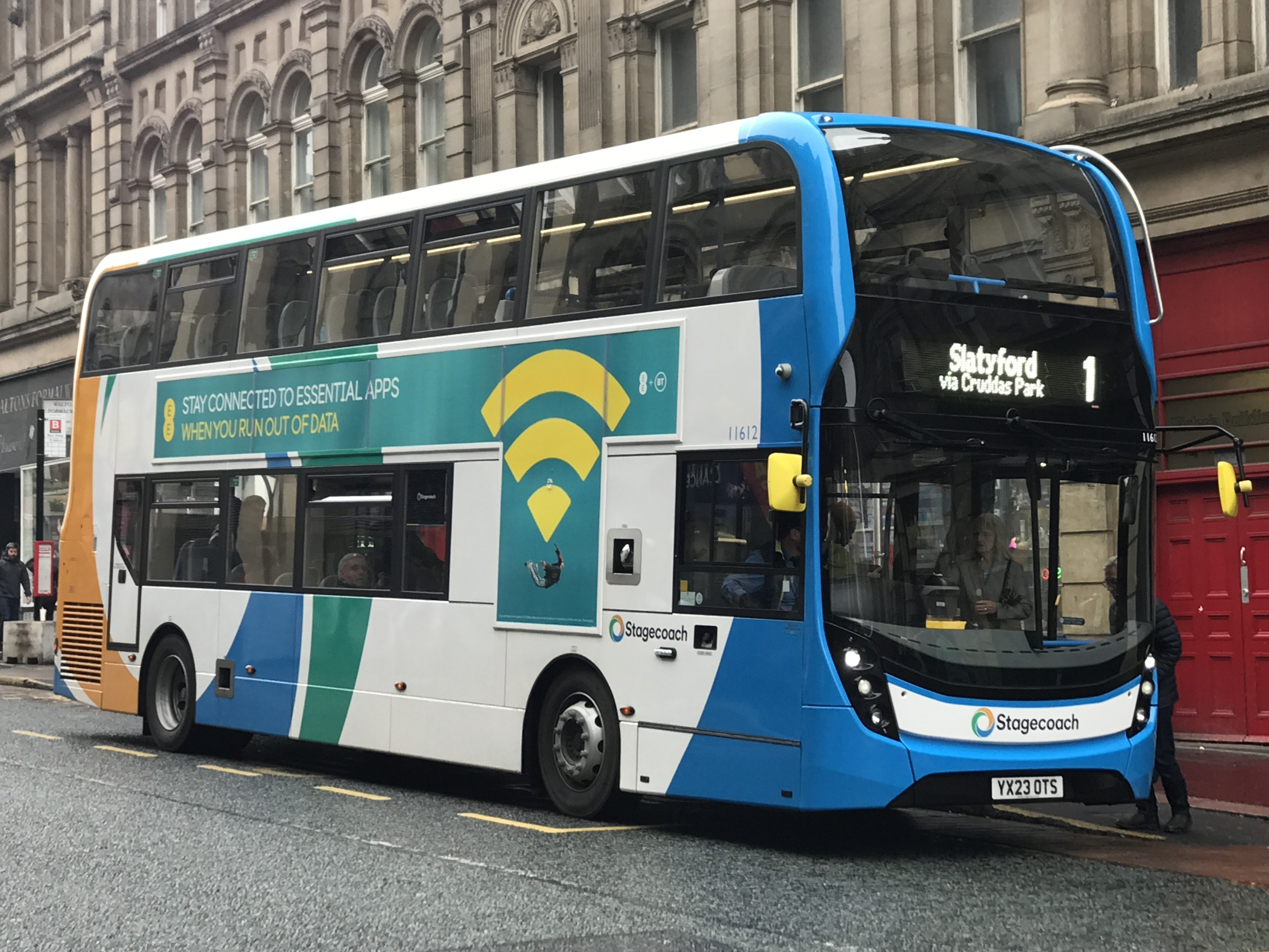
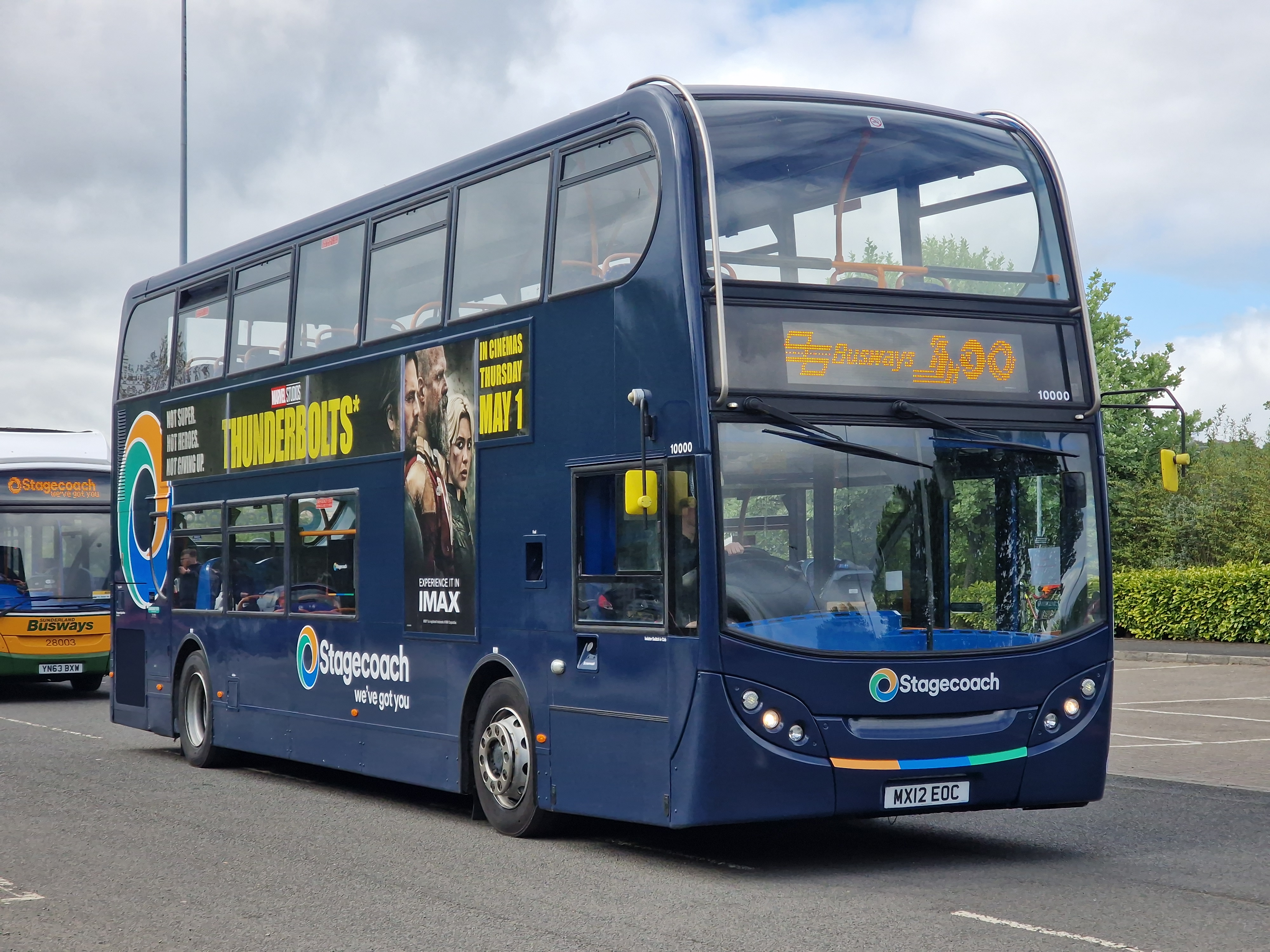
Fleet livery: past and present

From 2000, the standard fleet livery consisted of vehicles painted in a white base, with a blue skirt, and red and orange swoops.

After nearly 20 years, in January 2020, the standard fleet livery was replaced, and consists of vehicles branded in a white base with blue, green and orange swirls, featuring the company's updated logo.

The standard fleet livery was further updated in late 2024, with vehicles rebranded in a single-colour steel blue livery.
