= N-acylglucosamine 2-epimerase =

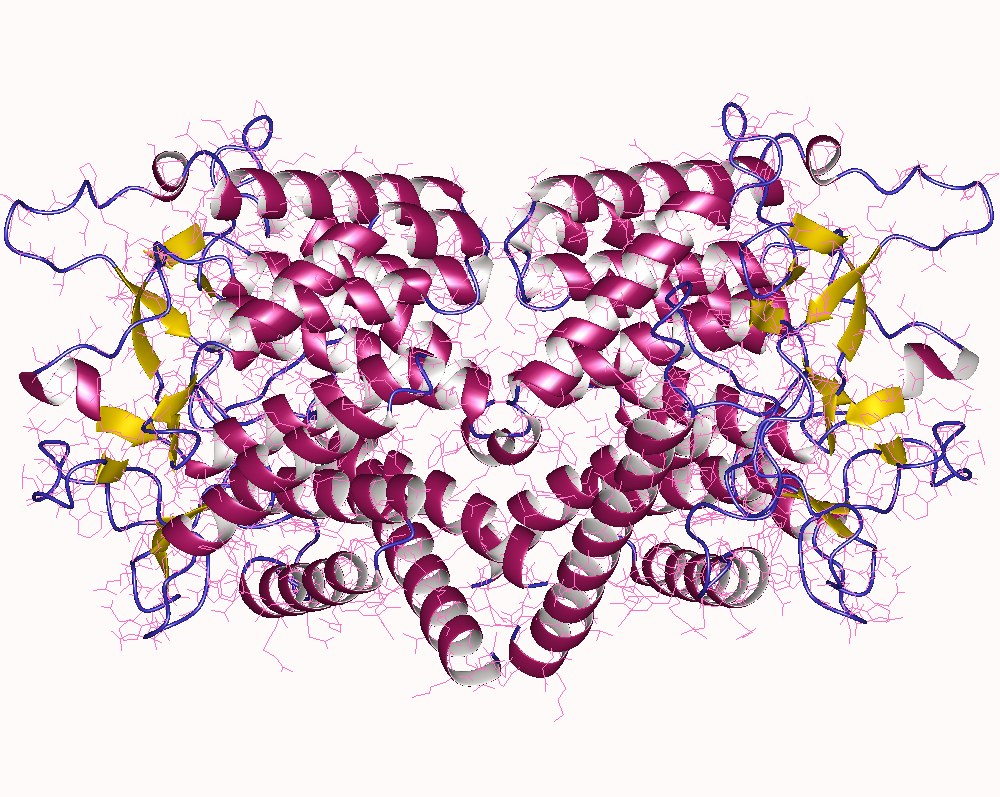
- N-acylglucosamine 2-epimerase dimer, Sus scrofa

Identifiers
- EC no.: 5.1.3.8
- CAS no.: 37318-34-6

Databases
- IntEnz: IntEnz view
- BRENDA: BRENDA entry
- ExPASy: NiceZyme view
- KEGG: KEGG entry
- MetaCyc: metabolic pathway
- PRIAM: profile
- PDB structures: RCSB PDB PDBe PDBsum
- Gene Ontology: AmiGO / QuickGO
Search
- PMC: articles
- PubMed: articles
- NCBI: proteins

In enzymology, a N-acylglucosamine 2-epimerase (EC 5.1.3.8) is an enzyme that catalyzes the chemical reaction

N-acyl-D-glucosamine $\rightleftharpoons$ N-acyl-D-mannosamine

Hence, this enzyme has one substrate, N-acyl-D-glucosamine, and one product, N-acyl-D-mannosamine.

This enzyme belongs to the family of isomerases, specifically those racemases and epimerases acting on carbohydrates and derivatives. The systematic name of this enzyme class is N-acyl-D-glucosamine 2-epimerase. Other names in common use include acylglucosamine 2-epimerase, and N-acetylglucosamine 2-epimerase. This enzyme participates in aminosugars metabolism. It employs one cofactor, ATP.

== Structural studies ==
As of late 2019, three structures have been solved for this class of enzymes, with the PDB accession codes 1FP3, 2GZ6, and 6F04. They show that the N-acylglucosamine 2-epimerase monomer folds as a barrel composed of α-helices, in a manner known as (α/α)_{6}-barrel. The structures are presented as dimers, with the structures from Sus scrofa and Anabaena sp. CH1 having a different organization than the structure from Nostoc sp. KJV10.
