= Slatyford =

Coordinates: 54.990°N 1.677°W

- Location within Tyne and Wear
- OS grid reference: NZ207661
  - London: 242 miles (389 km)
- Metropolitan borough: Newcastle upon Tyne
- Metropolitan county: Tyne and Wear
- Region: North East
- Country: England
- Sovereign state: United Kingdom
- Post town: NEWCASTLE UPON TYNE
- Postcode district: NE5
- Dialling code: 0191
- Police: Northumbria
- Fire: Tyne and Wear
- Ambulance: North East
- UK Parliament: Newcastle upon Tyne Central

Slatyford is situated in the West End of Newcastle upon Tyne, England, and houses the Stagecoach North East depot for local bus services throughout Newcastle. The depot was previously used by Newcastle Busways. Alongside the depot, following demolition of an existing site, a retail complex has been built, centred on a Wickes store.

Slatyford is also known by the slang name of 'Slaty'. the park is called slatypark The Tyneside Badminton Centre, which opened in 2013 is located in the area. It currently has three high-quality courts with plans to expand with the addition of a further six badminton-specific courts.
