= UDP-N,N'-diacetylbacillosamine 2-epimerase (hydrolysing) =

Class of enzymes

Identifiers
- EC no.: 3.2.1.184

Databases
- BRENDA: enzyme data
- ExPASy: NiceZyme view
- KEGG: enzyme entry
- MetaCyc: metabolic pathway
- Rhea: reactions
- PDB structures: RCSB PDB PDBe PDBsum
Search
- PMC: articles
- PubMed: articles
- NCBI: proteins

UDP-N,N'-diacetylbacillosamine 2-epimerase (hydrolysing) (EC 3.2.1.184, UDP-Bac2Ac4Ac 2-epimerase, NeuC) is an enzyme with systematic name UDP-N,N'-diacetylbacillosamine hydrolase (2-epimerising). It catalyses the following chemical reaction

UDP-N,N'-diacetylbacillosamine
H_{2}O
uridine diphosphate
+
(1)

The enzyme characterised from Legionella pneumophila and Campylobacter species removes the glycoside unit from uridine diphosphate N,N'-diacetylbacillosamine to give uridine diphosphate and 2,4-diacetamido-2,4,6-trideoxy-α-D-mannopyranose (1), with inversion of the stereochemistry at the 2-position.

This enzyme requires magnesium as Mg^{2+}. It is involved in biosynthesis of legionaminic acid.
