= Go North East =

Bus operator in North East England

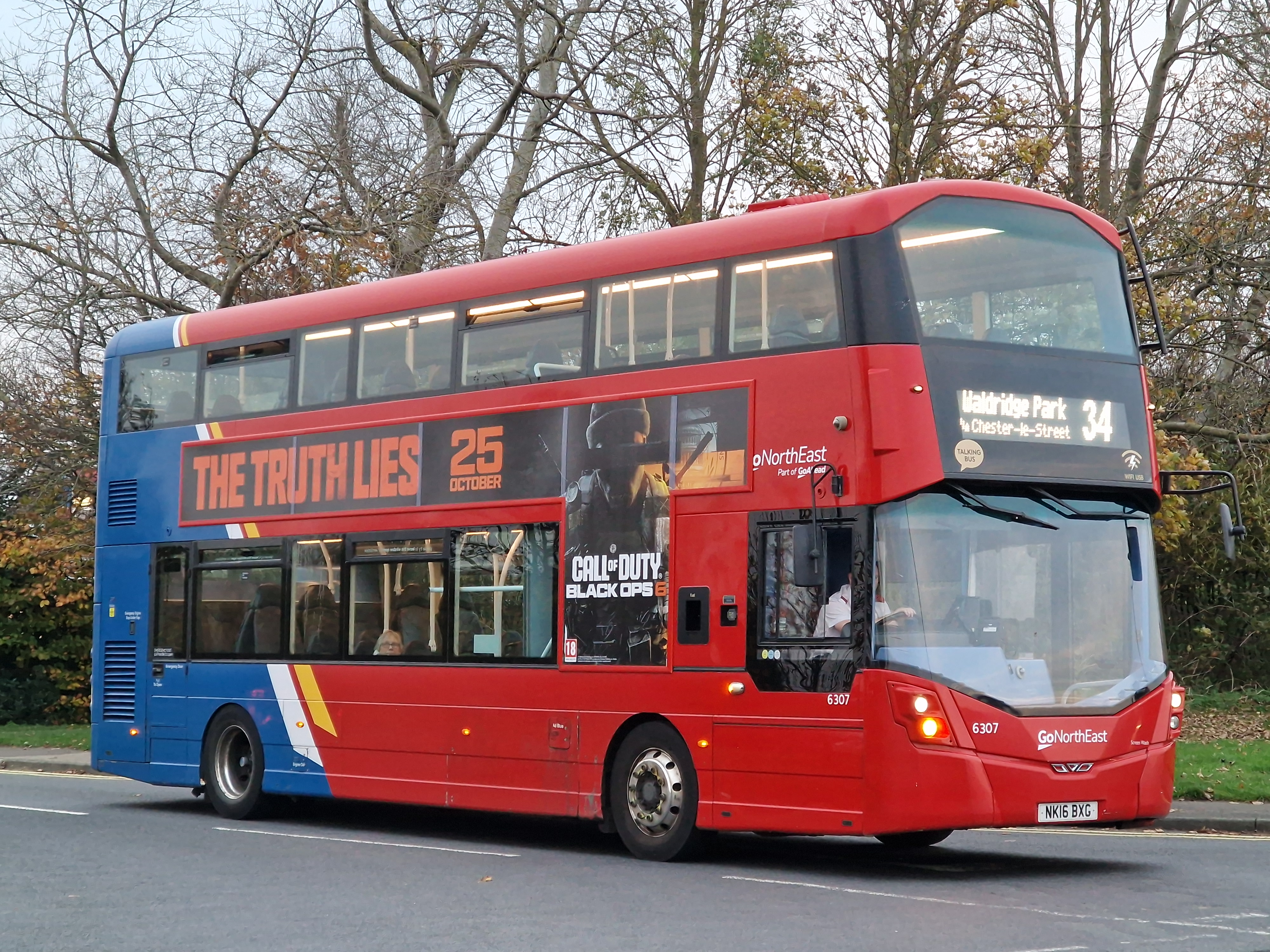
- Wright StreetDeck in Chester-le-Street in November 2024
- Parent: Go-Ahead Group
- Founded: February 1987; 39 years ago
- Headquarters: Gateshead, Tyne and Wear; England
- Service area: County Durham; Cumbria; Northumberland; North Yorkshire; Tyne and Wear
- Service type: Bus and coach
- Depots: 7
- Managing Director: Ben Gilligan
- Website: www.gonortheast.co.uk

Go North East is a bus operator running both local and regional bus services in County Durham, Cumbria, Northumberland, North Yorkshire and Tyne and Wear, England. It was previously known as the Northern General Transport Company and Go-Ahead Northern. The company was the foundation of today's Go-Ahead Group, which now operates bus and rail services across the United Kingdom, as well as Germany, Ireland, Norway and Singapore.

== History ==
=== 1980s: Post-deregulation ===
In October 1986, at the time of bus deregulation in Great Britain, the company operated from fourteen depots: Chester-le-Street, Consett, Gateshead, High Spen, Houghton-le-Spring, Jarrow, Murton, Percy Main, South Shields, Stanley, Sunderland, Wallsend, Washington and Winlaton.

As part of the privatisation of the National Bus Company, a management buyout led by Chris Moyes and Martin Ballinger saw the purchase of the Northern General Transport Company in February 1987.

=== 1990s: Early expansion ===
Early expansion saw the acquisition of a number of smaller competing bus operators in the region, including Langley Park-based Gypsy Queen in January 1990.

In February 1990, the company's Murton depot was closed, with the loss of 20 jobs. The remaining 109 staff were redeployed to other nearby depots in Houghton-le-Spring and Sunderland. In September 1990, the loss-making depot at Jarrow, and High Spen, which was making a marginal profit, were closed. Following the closures, a total of 20 jobs were lost, with a further 150 staff redeployed.

By January 1991, the parent company was split into five separate subsidiary companies: Coastline, Go-Ahead Gateshead, Go-Ahead Northern, VFM and Wear Buses.

On 29 April 1991, 350 Go-Ahead Northern drivers associated with the Transport and General Workers Union (TGWU) at Chester-le-Street, Consett and Stanley depots walked out on an indefinite strike in a dispute over pay – the first bus strike the region had seen since 1971. Despite striking drivers being threatened with pay cuts and dismissal if they had rejected new pay offers, the strike quickly escalated to 'all-out' sympathy strikes and overtime bans by most of Go-Ahead Northern's 1,150 drivers, with the exception of drivers in North Shields and the Voyager coaching arm.

Go-Ahead Northern hired in local independent operators such as Bishop Auckland-based OK Motor Services, Gateshead-based A-Line Coaches and Gardiners of Spennymoor to operate a handful of replacement services, some of whom were subject to intimidation by striking drivers. However, the company faced the threat of having its operating licence rescinded by the Traffic Commissioner under Section 26 of the Transport Act 1985 for not operating its registered bus and coach services. Initially, the first 350 striking drivers at Chester-le-Street, Consett and Stanley were served redundancy notices by Go-Ahead Northern for breach of contract, but negotiations between the company and the TGWU, mediated by Acas, saw these notices withdrawn. The actions of Go-Ahead Northern's management were additionally condemned by six local Labour members of parliament in a House of Commons early day motion.

On 28 May 1991, after four weeks, the strike ended. Striking drivers voted to accept a 7% pay increase and arbitration for a possible higher award, being the longest bus strike held in the North East of England at the time. In an attempt to regain customer confidence, Go-Ahead Northern briefly cut fares to 10p for any bus service running south of the River Tyne.

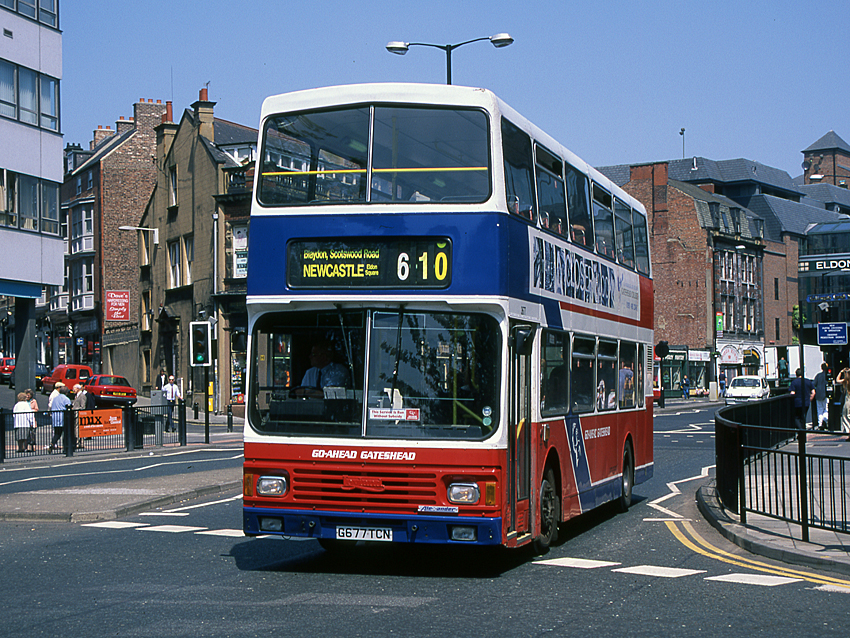
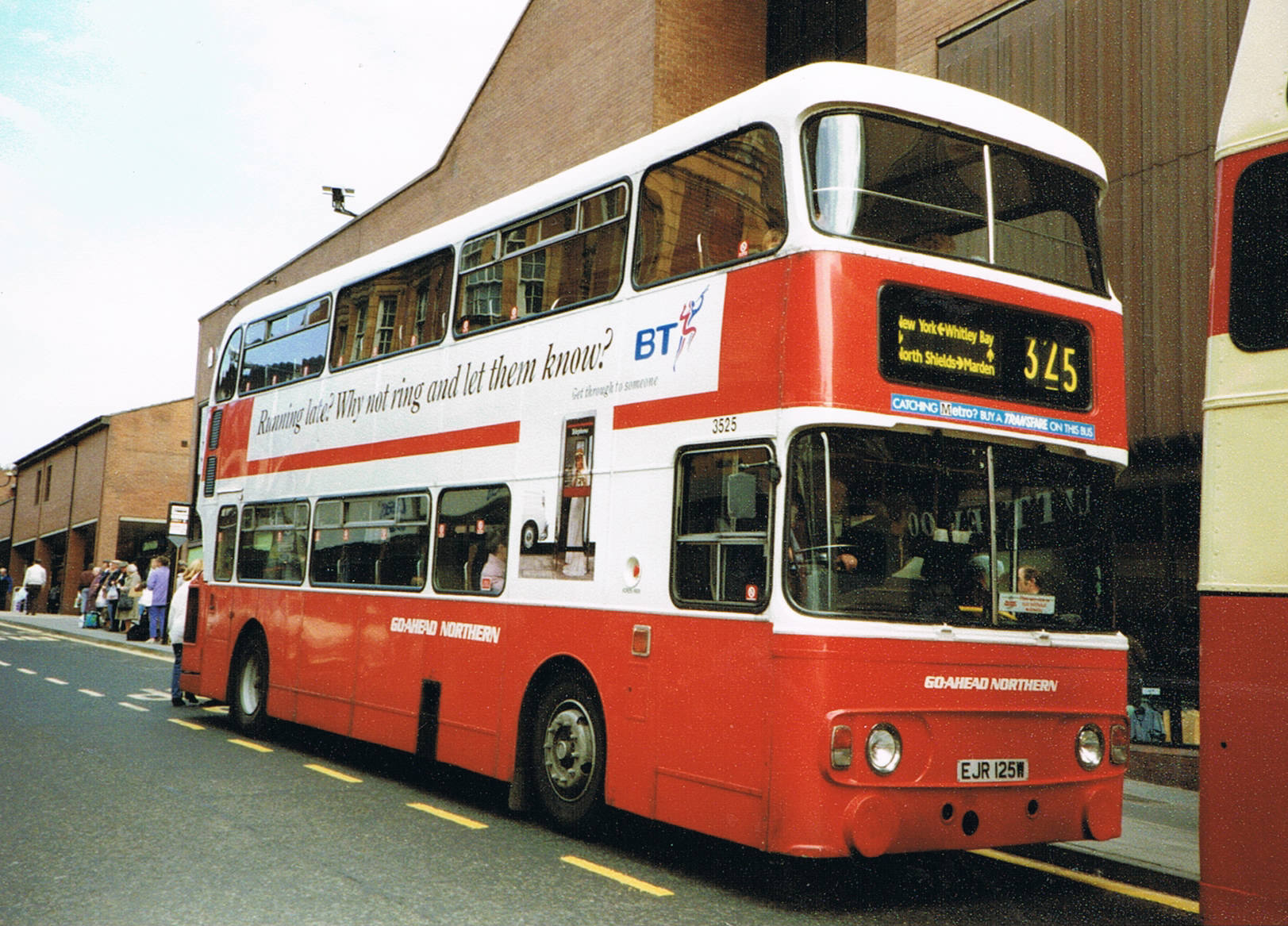
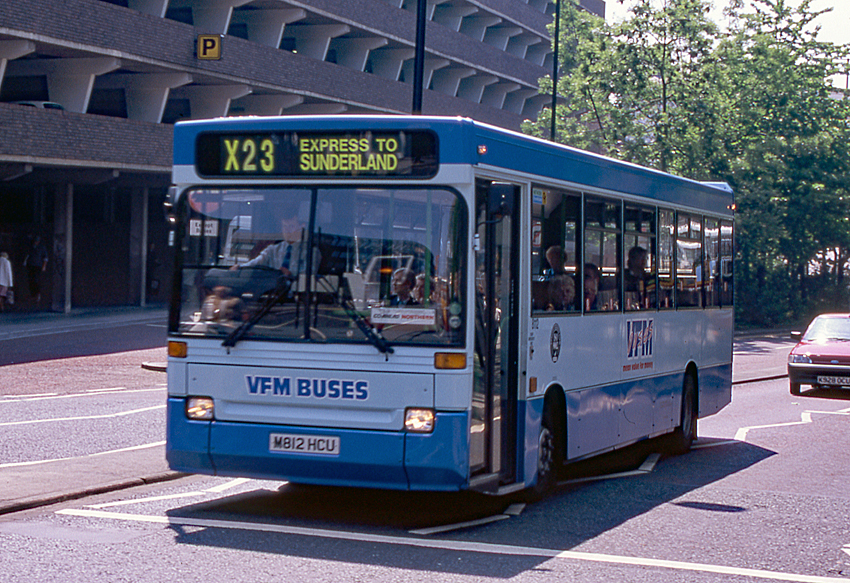
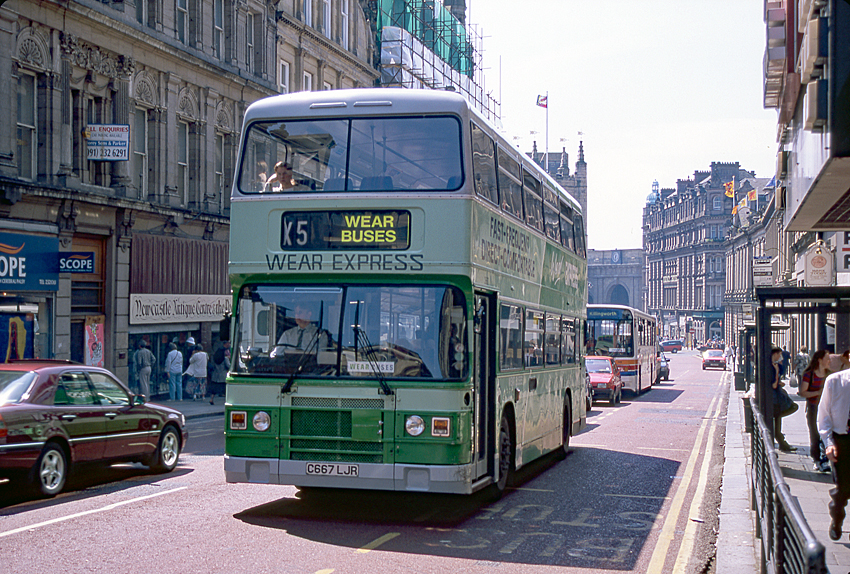
Operations in the 1990s

In March 1995, the Go-Ahead Group acquired OK Motor Services for £5.4 million. Following the acquisition, many of OK's staff, including the general manager, Charles Marshall, became employees of Go-Ahead. OK initially became one of Go-Ahead's locally managed subsidiaries, with Marshall remaining in charge. Go-Ahead later took steps to streamline the business, with several of the group's earlier acquisitions transferred to OK.

In August 1998, a new depot was opened on Deptford Terrace, Sunderland. This saw the closure of the nearby Park Lane depot, which was demolished to allow the development of the current Park Lane Interchange, which opened in May 1999, ahead of the introduction of Tyne and Wear Metro services between Pelaw and South Hylton via Sunderland. Additionally, the company's depot at Philadelphia Lane, Houghton-le-Spring, was also closed at this time. The depot remained in situ until the early 2020s, until it was demolished to allow for redevelopment of the area.

=== 2000s ===
In February 2005, the company's depot in South Shields was closed, with operations transferred to Sunderland (Deptford).

The following year, on 8 April 2006, the former OK Motor Services depot in Bishop Auckland was closed, with some of its operations acquired by Arriva North East and operated from their own depot in the town. Go North East's remaining operations transferred to Chester-le-Street, with the company retaining an, albeit smaller, presence in and around Bishop Auckland.

In October 2007, the company acquired Stanley-based operator Stanley Taxis, which operated both commercial and tendered local bus services in County Durham and Tyne and Wear. At the time of acquisition, operations consisted of a fleet of 13 vehicles and 16 staff.

=== 2010s ===
In March 2010, the company swapped around 50 staff and half-a-dozen routes, as well as depots in Ashington and Hexham, with Arriva North East, allowing both companies to consolidate their operations.

In June 2010, the company was awarded a five-year contract to operate the QuayLink network of services. Award of the contract saw the introduction of a fleet of nine Euro 5 diesel-powered single-deck Optare Versa.

In January 2012, as a celebration of the company's centenary year, the OK Motor Services branding was briefly revived, following the introduction of two routes serving Bishop Auckland, Crook and Darlington.

In February 2014, depots in Gateshead (Sunderland Road) and Winlaton were replaced by an £8.5 million "super depot", known as Riverside. The 5.75-acre (23,300 m^{2}) site, located in Dunston was constructed with capacity for over 160 vehicles and 500 staff.

In June 2018, Hull-based East Yorkshire Motor Services was acquired by the Go-Ahead Group, bringing an end to 30 years of family ownership. Following acquisition, the company was rebranded as East Yorkshire and operated as a standalone company within Go North East.

In March 2019, after almost 100 years in service, Stanley depot was closed. Following closure, operations were subsequently moved to a new 2.23-acre (9,000 m^{2}) depot at Hownsgill Industrial Estate in Consett, which is located on the site of the former Consett Steelworks. The £3.5 million depot was constructed with the capacity for 63 vehicles and 180 staff.

In December 2019, a "farewell" event was held to mark the retirement of the final remaining Scania L94 vehicles – the first of which joined the fleet in March 2001. The fleet, including four articulated vehicles, grew to a total of 87 of the type – the last of which entered service in 2006.

=== 2020 – the present day ===
In July 2020, the company's first fully-electric zero-emission vehicle trial took place, with a single-deck Optare MetroCity serving a series of routes in Gateshead, Newcastle upon Tyne and North Tyneside. Following this, in November 2020, the first of a fleet of nine zero-emission single-deck Yutong E10 were introduced on routes 53 and 54, as part of a jointly-funded project between Go North East and the UK Government's Ultra-Low Emission Bus Fund – at a cost of £3.7 million.

In February 2022, a further zero-emission vehicle trial took place on route 21, with the evaluation of a Wright StreetDeck Electroliner double-deck vehicles. In January 2026, delivery of a fleet of 25 of these vehicles commenced, with four Alexander Dennis Enviro200EVs due to follow later in the year.

In March 2022, the company's depot in Peterlee, an outstation of Sunderland (Deptford) depot was closed, with operations transferred to nearby depots in Chester-le-Street and Sunderland (Deptford).

In June 2022, just over four years after acquisition, it was announced that East Yorkshire would be split from Go North East, becoming a separate company within the Go-Ahead Group. In the same month, it was announced that the company intended to close Chester-le-Street depot.

Following the departure of Martijn Gilbert in August 2022, the former Go North West Managing Director, Nigel Featham, assumed Gilbert's role at Go North East. At East Yorkshire, former Area Manager, Ben Gilligan, was promoted to Managing Director. Featham departed the role in January 2026 to solely become the Managing Director of Go North West, with East Yorkshire's Ben Gilligan assuming Featham's vacated role.

In September 2023, following the closure of Arriva North East's Jesmond depot, Go North East took over operation of a number of the company's routes in Newcastle upon Tyne and North Tyneside, which were subsequently rebranded as North Tyne Rockets. At the time of transfer, routes were operated by a fleet of single-deck Wright StreetLite buses, branded in a purple livery.

==== Industrial action ====
In late 2023, operations suffered serious disruption, due to strike action by employees. Organised by Unite the Union, the first strikes each took place for a period of one week, beginning 30 September 2023 and 14 October 2023 respectively.

Following this, union members began an indefinite strike on 28 October 2023 – during which no services across the region, with the exception of some school and works services, operated. A limited intra-peak hour service was introduced on certain routes from 14 November 2023.

The strike was brought to an end on 1 December 2023, when union members voted in favour of an improved pay offer, with normal service resuming the following day. Following the strike, a special promotion was introduced whereby customers were able to travel on the network free-of-charge between 2–8 December 2023.

== Fleet and operations ==
=== Depots ===
As of February 2026, the company operates from seven bus depots across the region: Consett (Hownsgill), Gateshead (Riverside & Saltmeadows Road), Hexham, Percy Main, Sunderland (Deptford) and Washington.

=== Vehicles ===
The fleet consists mainly of diesel-powered vehicles manufactured by Alexander Dennis, Optare, Volvo, Wrightbus and Yutong, as well as fully-electric vehicles manufactured by Alexander Dennis, Wrightbus and Yutong.

== Branding ==
From the late 1990s until the early 2010s, the standard fleet livery consisted of vehicles branded in a red, blue and yellow colour scheme. In 2006, the company introduced route branding – a practice which aimed to give each service, or group of services, a recognisable identity, colour scheme and logo. Route branding has since led to the company adopting a multi-coloured fleet of vehicles across the region.

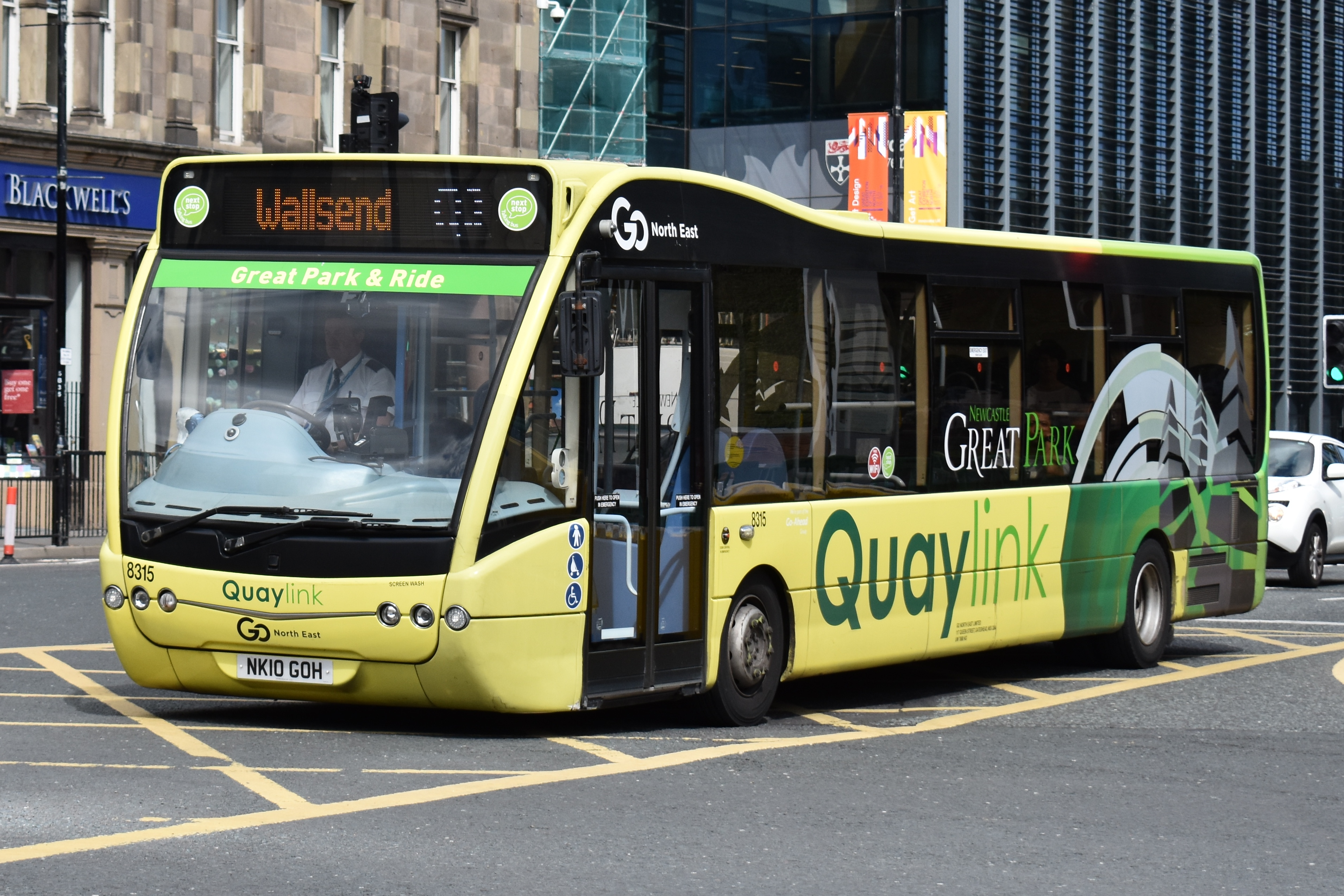
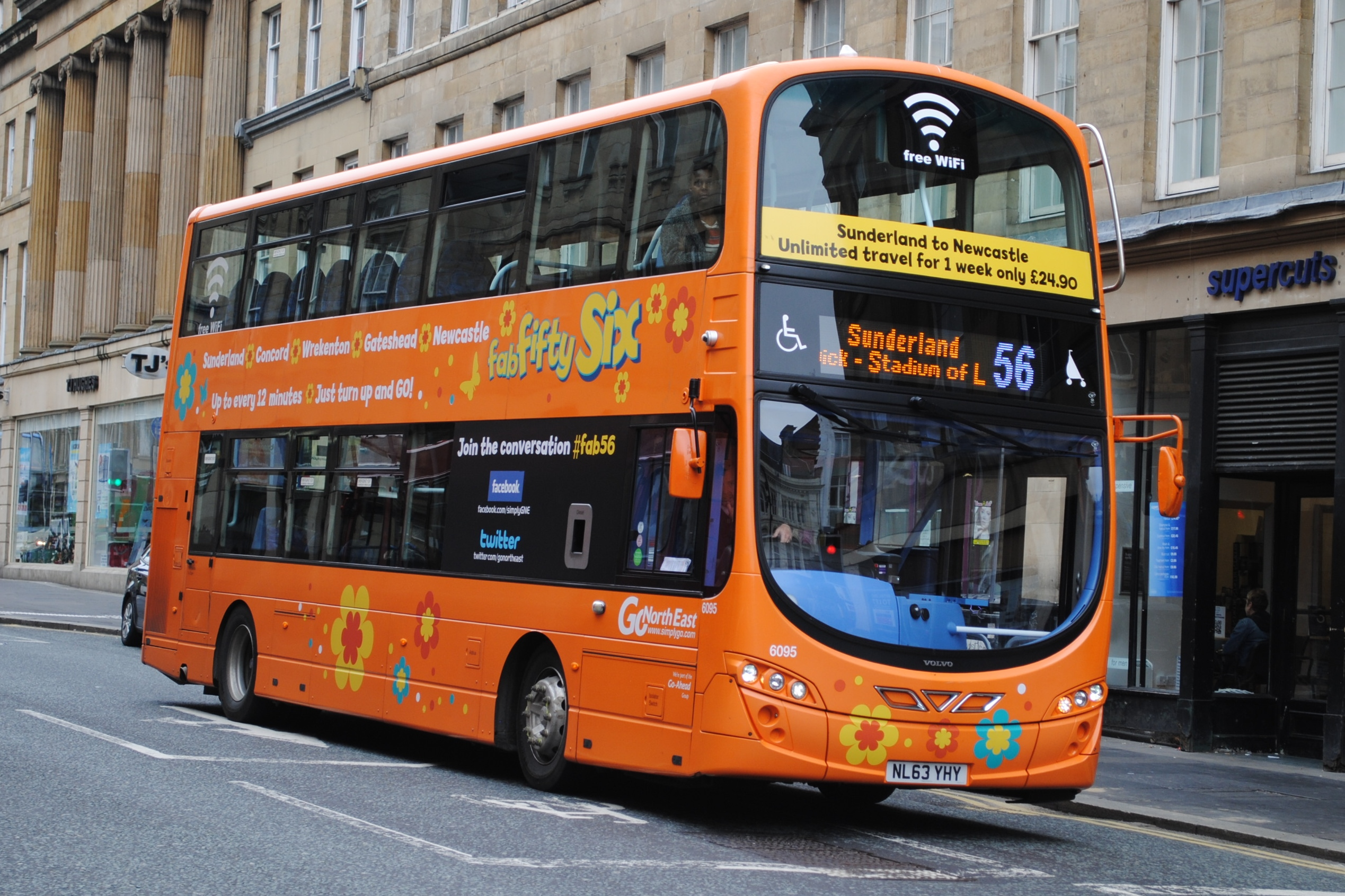
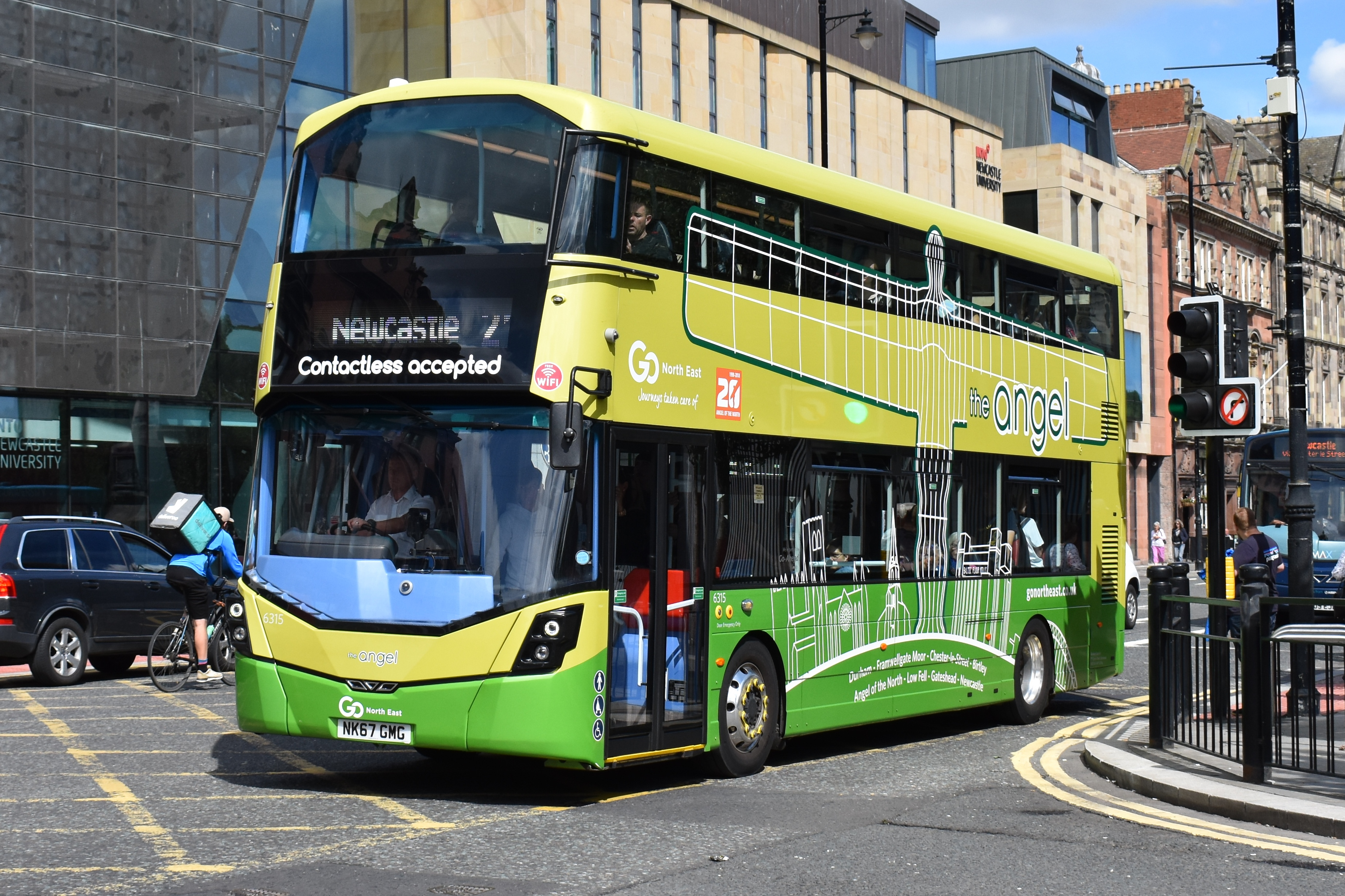
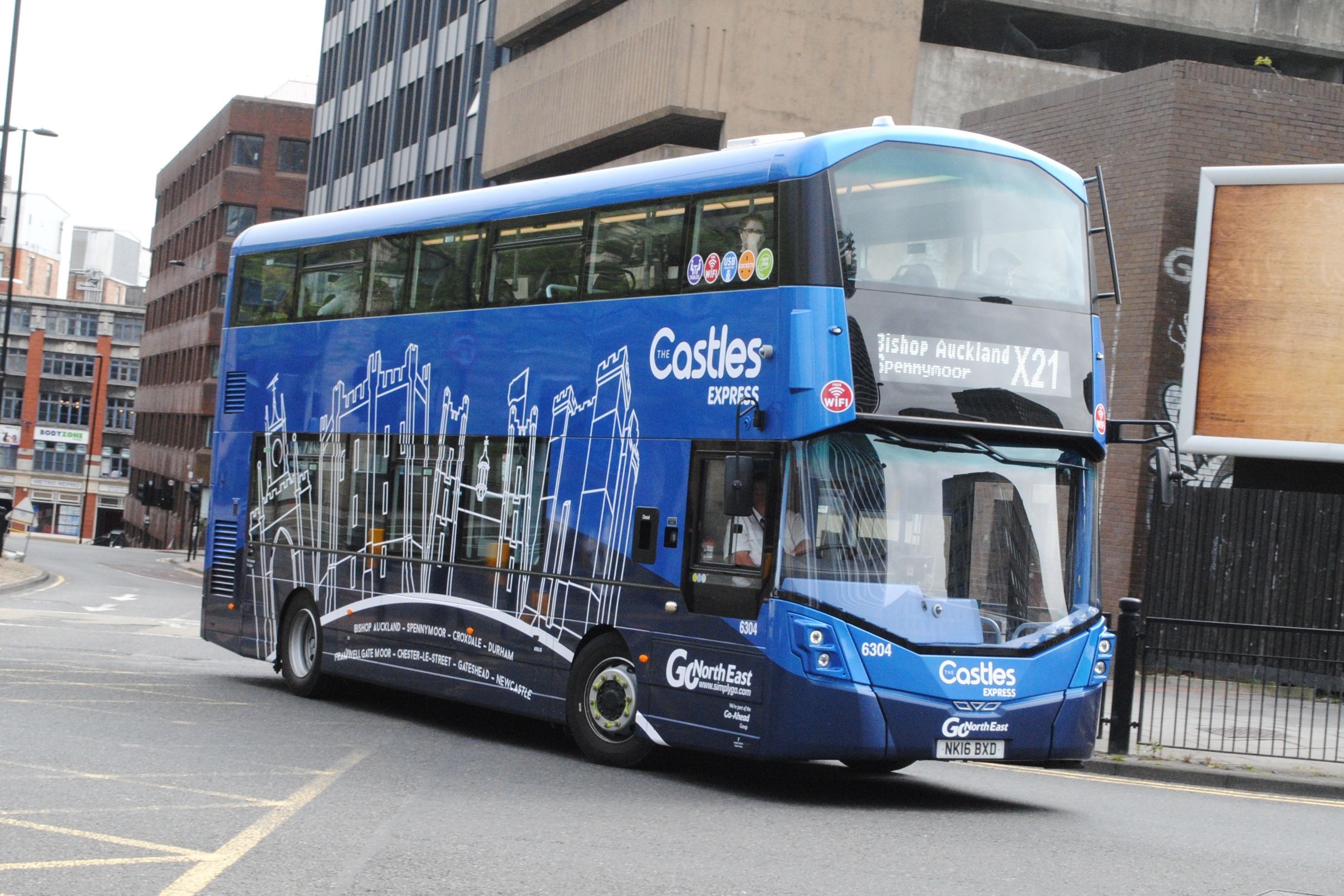
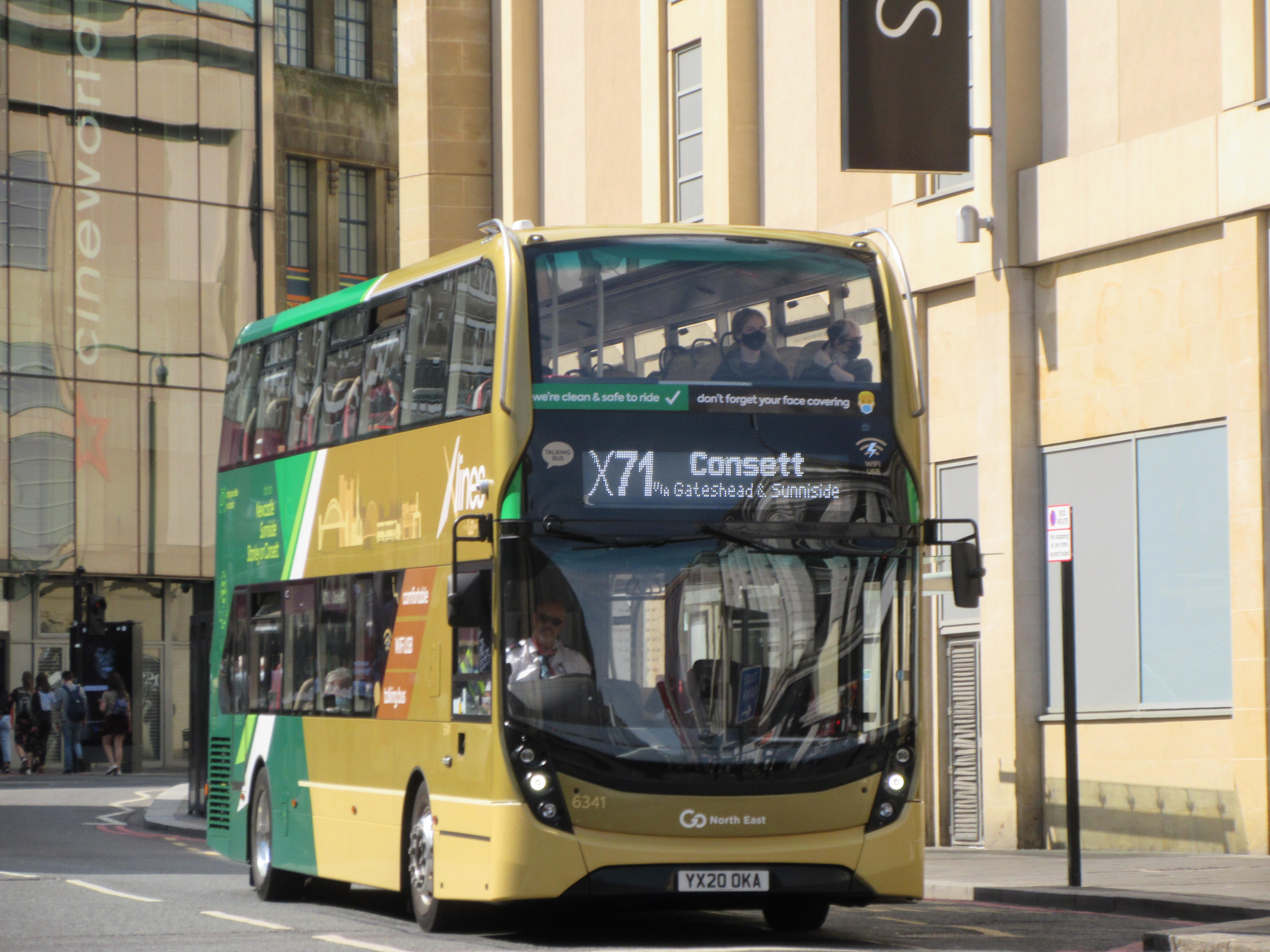
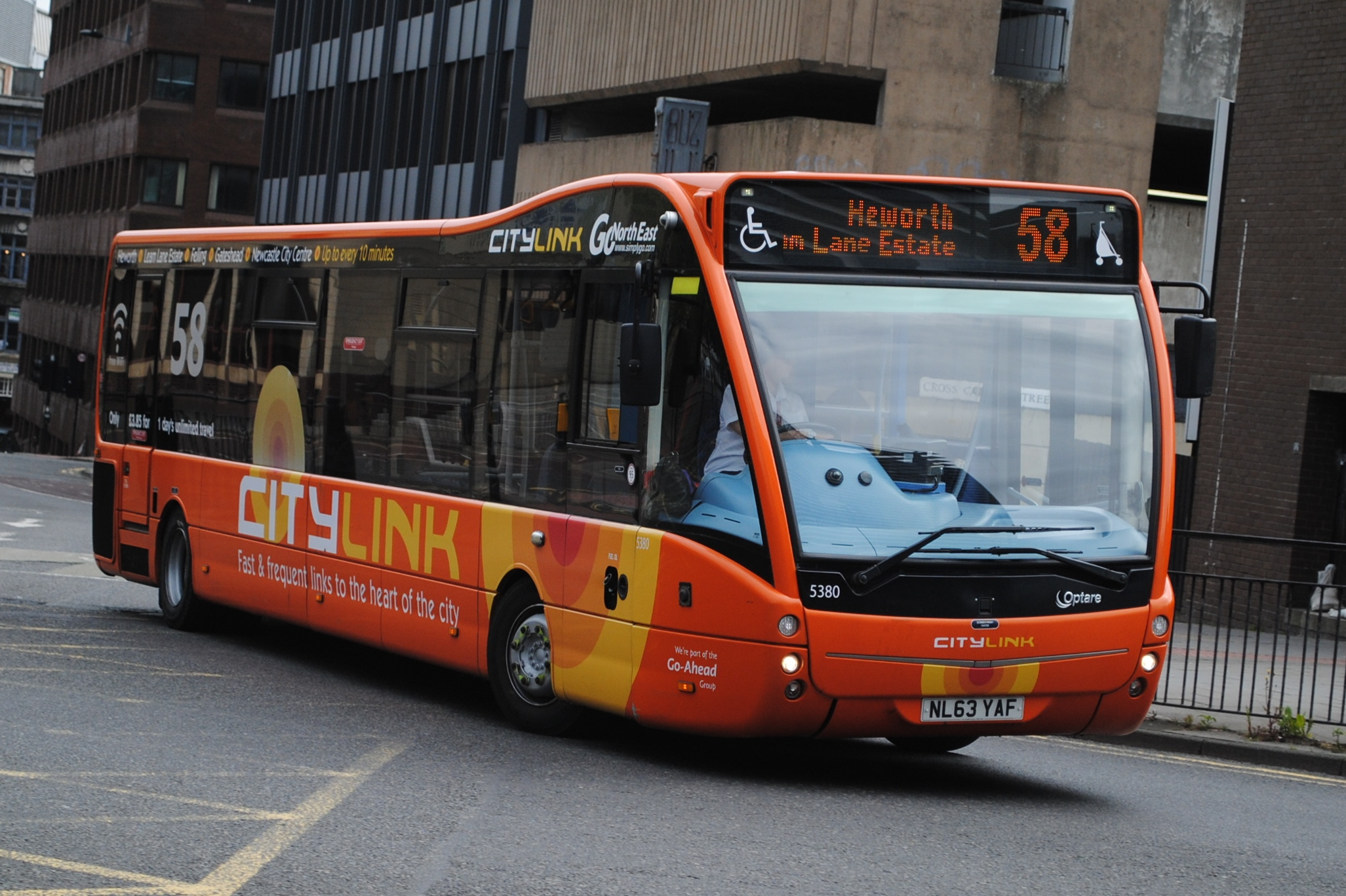
Route branding: past and present

In 2013, an updated standard fleet livery was introduced, which saw the red, blue and yellow colour scheme phased out. The rebranding exercise saw vehicles without route branding painted in an all-over red colour scheme. This proved to be short-lived, with the standard fleet livery further updated in 2016. Vehicles were repainted red at the front, and blue at the back, separated by a white strip, with a tagline and website featuring above the windows on single-deck buses, or below the lower-deck windows on double-deck buses.

In 2019, a number of minor adjustments were made to the, now standard, standard fleet livery – including the use of a lighter shade of blue at the rear and replacement of the curved white separation strip with a double white and yellow diagonal line. At the time of the refresh, only around one-third of vehicles in the fleet wore the standard fleet livery.

The following year, a fleet of coaches used for private hire and contract services, were repainted into a range of retro-inspired heritage liveries, with a number of single and double-deck buses used on local and regional services, as well as private hire and contract services, following later.

As well as local and regional bus services, the company also operate coach services under contract to National Express. Vehicles are painted in an all-white livery, featuring the client's distinctive blue and red logo.
