= UDP-N-acetylglucosamine 2-epimerase (hydrolysing) =

Class of enzymes

Identifiers
- EC no.: 3.2.1.183

Databases
- BRENDA: enzyme data
- ExPASy: NiceZyme view
- KEGG: enzyme entry
- MetaCyc: metabolic pathway
- Rhea: reactions
- PDB structures: RCSB PDB PDBe PDBsum
Search
- PMC: articles
- PubMed: articles
- NCBI: proteins

UDP-N-acetylglucosamine 2-epimerase (hydrolysing) (EC 3.2.1.183, UDP-N-acetylglucosamine 2-epimerase, GNE (gene), siaA (gene), neuC (gene)) is an enzyme with systematic name UDP-N-acetyl-alpha-D-glucosamine hydrolase (2-epimerising). It catalyses the following chemical reaction

uridine diphosphate N-acetylglucosamine
H_{2}O
uridine diphosphate
+
N-acetyl-D-mannosamine

The enzyme found in mammalian liver, as well as in some pathogenic bacteria including Neisseria meningitidis and Staphylococcus aureus removes the glycoside unit from uridine diphosphate N-acetylglucosamine to give uridine diphosphate and N-acetyl-D-mannosamine. The stereochemistry of the N-acetyl sidechain is inverted during the reaction. The conversion is part of the biosynthesis of sialic acids.
