= C9H10O3 =

The molecular formula C_{9}H_{10}O_{3} may refer to:

- Apocynin, a natural phenol
- Caffeyl alcohol, a natural phenol
- Dimethoxybenzaldehydes
  - 2,4-Dimethoxybenzaldehyde, a reagent used to specifically quantify phlorotannins
  - 2,5-Dimethoxybenzaldehyde
  - 3,4-Dimethoxybenzaldehyde (veratraldehyde)
- 2-Ethoxybenzoic acid
- Ethylparaben
- Ethyl salicylate
- Ethylvanillin
- Methyl anisate
- Paeonol, a natural phenol
- Phloretic acid, a phenylpropanoid
- Premethylenomycin C lactone
- Tropic acid
