= Aspartate racemase =

aspartate racemase

Identifiers
- EC no.: 5.1.1.13
- CAS no.: 37237-56-2

Databases
- IntEnz: IntEnz view
- BRENDA: BRENDA entry
- ExPASy: NiceZyme view
- KEGG: KEGG entry
- MetaCyc: metabolic pathway
- PRIAM: profile
- PDB structures: RCSB PDB PDBe PDBsum
- Gene Ontology: AmiGO / QuickGO
Search
- PMC: articles
- PubMed: articles
- NCBI: proteins

In enzymology, an aspartate racemase (EC 5.1.1.13) is an enzyme that catalyzes the following chemical reaction:

L-aspartate $\rightleftharpoons$ D-aspartate

This enzyme belongs to the family of isomerases, specifically those racemases and epimerases acting on amino acids and amino acid derivatives, including glutamate racemase, proline racemase, and diaminopimelate epimerase.

The systematic name of this enzyme class is aspartate racemase. Other names in common use include D-aspartate racemase, and McyF.

== Discovery ==
Aspartate racemase was first discovered in the gram-positive bacteria Streptococcus faecalis by Lamont et al. in 1972. It was then determined that aspartate racemase also racemizes L-alanine around half as quickly as it does L-aspartate, but does not show racemase activity in the presence of L-glutamate.

== Structure ==
The crystallographic structure of bacterial aspartate racemase has been solved in Pyrococcus horikoshii OT3, Escherichia coli, Microcystis aeruginosa, and Picrophilus torridus DSM 9790.

=== Homodimer ===
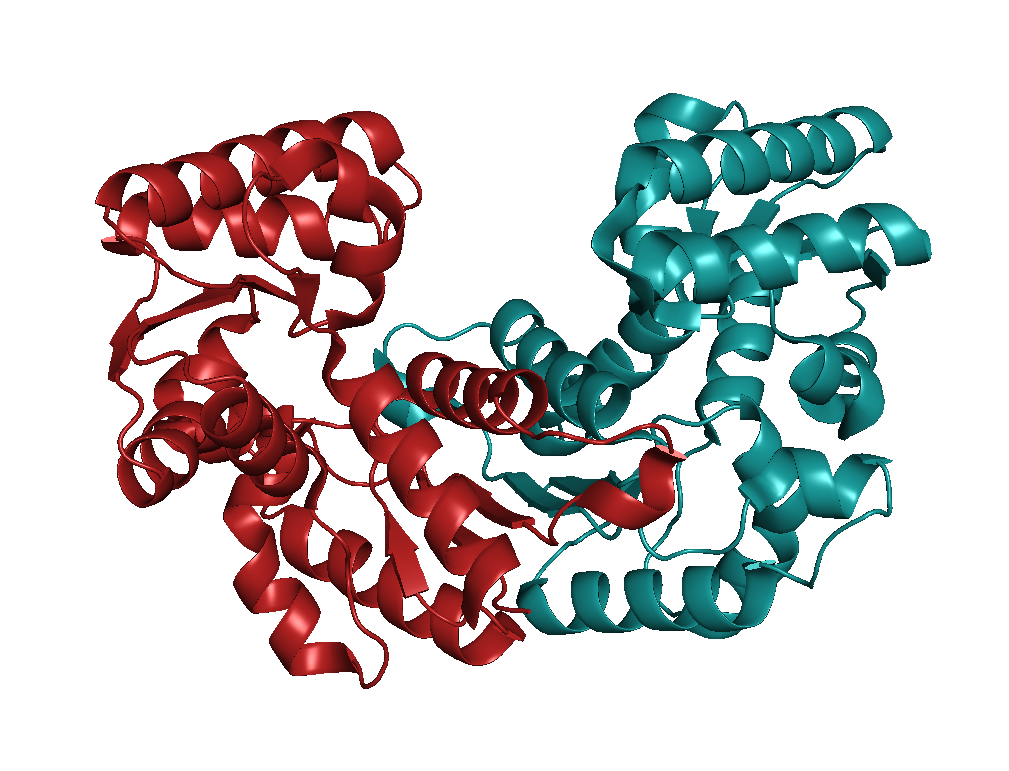
Homodimeric aspartate racemase isolated from P. horikoshii, viewed at an angle showing the binding pocket. The different colors refer to the different monomers of the complex.

In most bacteria for which the structure is known, aspartate racemase exists as a homodimer, where each subunit has a molecular weight of approximately 25 kDa. The complex consists primarily of alpha helices, and additionally features a Rossmann fold in the center of the dimer. The catalytic pocket lies at the cleft formed by the intersection of the two domains. A citrate molecule can fit inside the binding pocket, leading to a contraction of the cleft to make the "closed form" of aspartate racemase.

Two highly conserved cysteine residues are suggested to be responsible for the interconversion of L-aspartate and D-aspartate. These cysteine residues lie 3–4 angstroms away from the α-carbon of aspartate. Site-directed mutagenesis studies showed that the mutation of the upstream cysteine residue to serine resulted in complete loss of racemization activity, while the same mutation in the downstream cysteine residue resulted in retention of 10–20% racemization activity. However, mutation of the acid residue glutamate, which stabilizes the downstream cysteine residue, resulted in complete loss of racemization activity. Up to 9 other residues are known to interact with and stabilize the isomers of aspartate through hydrogen bonding or hydrophobic interactions.

In E. coli, one of the active cysteine residues is substituted for a threonine residue, allowing for much greater substrate promiscuity. Notably, aspartate racemase in E. coli is also able to catalyze the racemization of glutamate.

=== Monomer ===
In 2004, an aspartate racemase was discovered in Bifidobacterium bifidum as a 27 kDa monomer. This protein shares nearly identical enzymological properties with homodimeric aspartate racemase isolated from Streptococcus thermophilus, but has the added characteristic that its thermal stability increases significantly in the presence of aspartate.

== Reaction mechanism ==
Aspartate racemase catalyzes the following reaction:

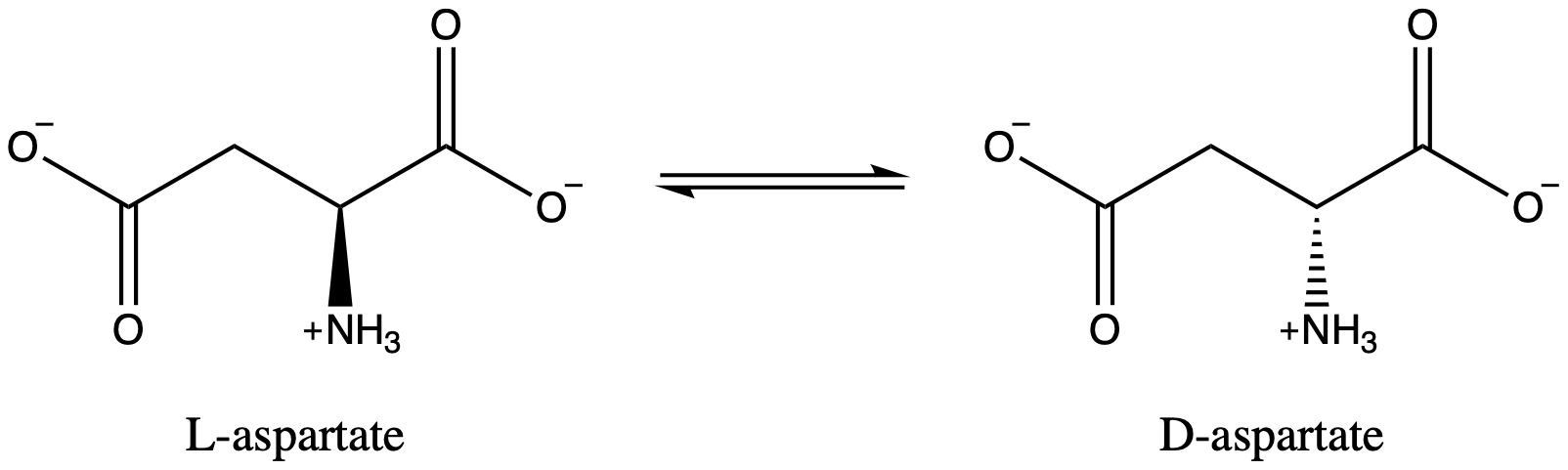

Aspartate racemase can accept either L-aspartate or D-aspartate as substrates.

Amino acid racemization is carried out by two dominant mechanisms: one-base mechanisms and two-base mechanisms. In one-base mechanisms, a proton acceptor abstracts the α-hydrogen from the substrate amino acid to form a carbanion intermediate until reprotonated at the other face of the α-carbon. Racemases dependent on pyridoxal-5-phosphate (PLP) typically leverage one-base mechanisms. In the two-base mechanism, an alpha hydrogen is abstracted by a base on one face of the amino acid while another protonated base concertedly donates its hydrogen onto the other face of the amino acid.

=== PLP-independent mechanism ===
Aspartate racemases in bacteria function in the absence of PLP, suggesting a PLP-independent mechanism. A two-base mechanism is supported in the literature, carried out by two thiol groups:

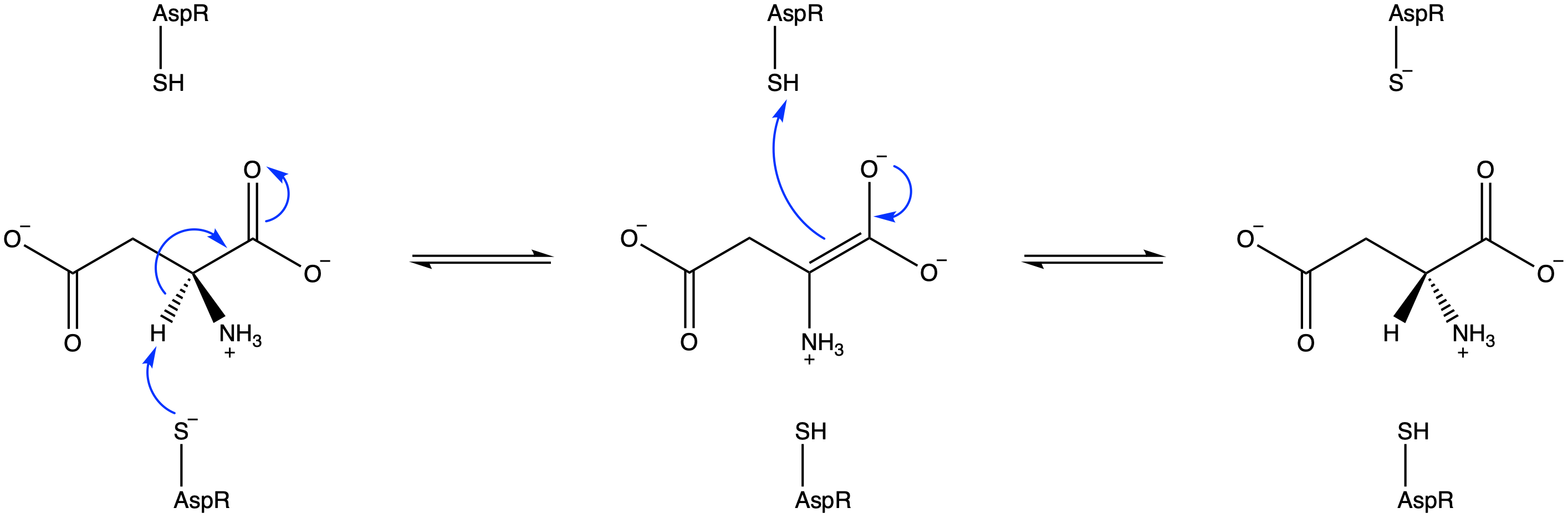

Other PLP-independent isomerases in bacteria include glutamate racemase, proline racemase, and hydroxyproline-2-epimerase.

=== PLP-dependent mechanism ===
Mammalian aspartate racemase, in contrast with bacterial aspartate racemase, is a PLP-dependent enzyme. The exact mechanism is unknown, but it is hypothesized to proceed similarly to mammalian serine racemase as below:

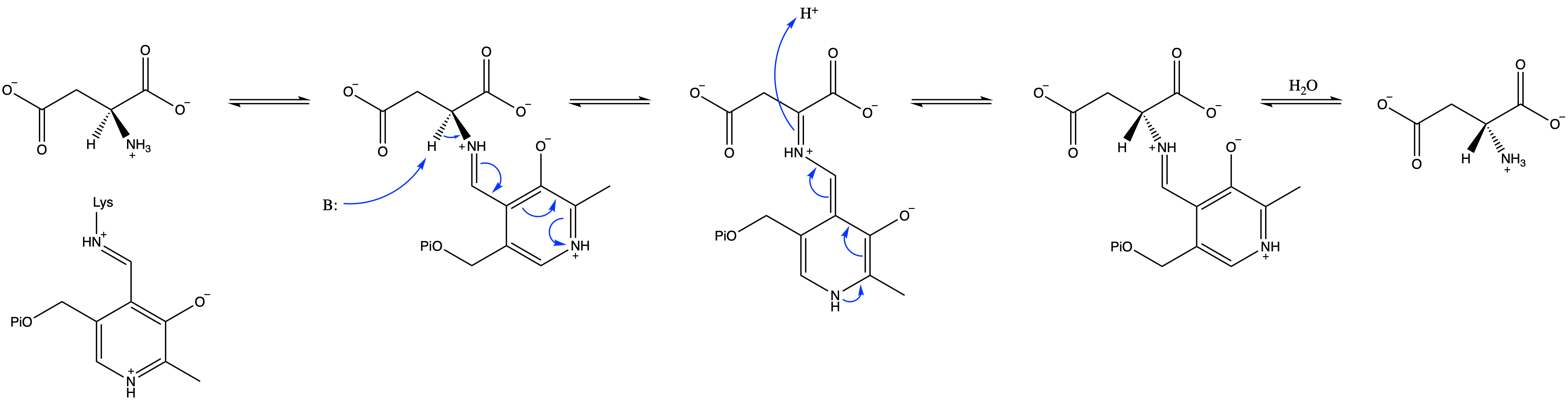

== Inhibition ==
General inhibitors for cysteine residues have shown to be effective agents against monomeric aspartate racemase. N-ethylmaleimide and 5,5'-dithiobis(2-nitrobenzoate) both inhibit monomeric aspartate racemase at 1mM.

== Function ==
=== Metabolism of D-aspartate ===
One of the primary functions of aspartate racemase in bacteria is the metabolism of D-aspartate. The beginning of D-aspartate metabolism is its conversion to L-alanine. First, D-aspartate is isomerized to L-aspartate by aspartate racemase, followed by decarboxylation to form L-alanine.

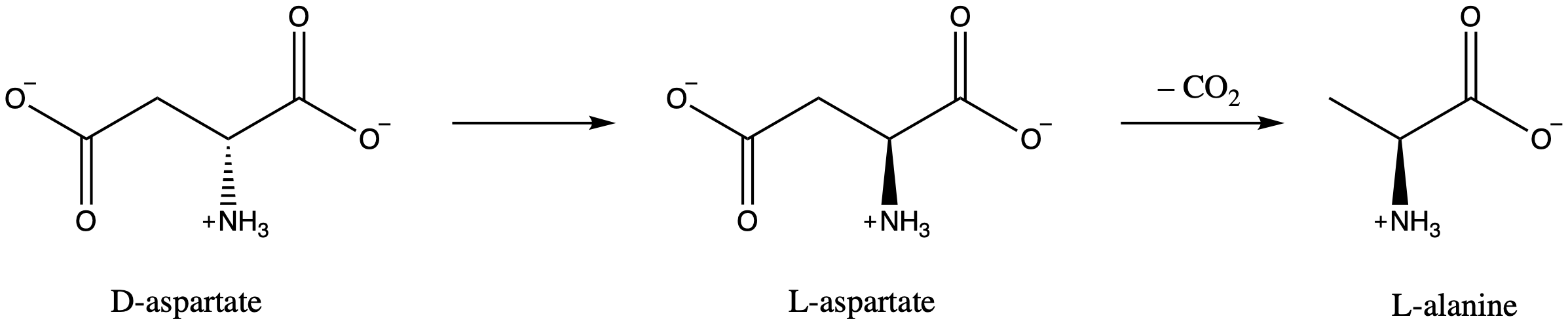

=== Peptidoglycan synthesis ===
D-amino acids are common within the peptidoglycan of bacteria. In Bifidobacterium bifidum, D-aspartate is formed from L-aspartate via aspartate racemase and used as a cross-linker moiety in the peptidoglycan.

=== Mammalian neurogenesis ===
Aspartate racemase is highly expressed in the brain, the heart, and the testes of mammals, all tissues in which D-aspartate is present. D-aspartate is abundant in the embryonic brain, but falls during postnatal development. Retrovirus-mediated expression of short hairpin RNA complementary to aspartate racemase in newborn neurons of the adult hippocampus led to defects in dendritic development and impaired survival of the newborn neurons, suggesting that aspartate racemase may modulate adult neurogenesis in mammals.

== Evolution ==
Phylogenetic analysis shows that PLP-dependent animal aspartate racemases are in the same family as PLP-dependent animal serine racemases, and the genes encoding them share a common ancestor. Aspartate racemases in animals have independently evolved from serine racemases through amino acid substitutions, namely, the introduction of three consecutive serine residues. Serine racemases isolated from Saccoglossus kowalevskii also show both high aspartate and glutamate racemization activity.
