= Premethylenomycin C lactone =

Investigational antibiotic

Clinical data
- ATC code: none

Identifiers
- IUPAC name: (3aS,6aS)-4,5-dimethyl-3a,6a-dihydro-1H-cyclopenta[c]furan-3,6-dione
- CAS Number: 1932340-19-6
- PubChem CID: 130870813
- ChemSpider: 61452160

Chemical and physical data
- Formula: C_{9}H_{10}O_{3}
- Molar mass: 166.176 g·mol^{−1}
- 3D model (JSmol): Interactive image
- SMILES: O=C1[C@@]2([C@](C(C)=C1C)(C(=O)OC2)[H])[H]
- InChI: InChI=1S/C9H10O3/c1-4-5(2)8(10)6-3-12-9(11)7(4)6/h6-7H,3H2,1-2H3/t6-,7-/m1/s1; Key:JWRKRFZYNNBFNA-RNFRBKRXSA-N

Premethylenomycin C lactone is a natural product with potent antibiotic activity, effective in vitro against drug-resistant bacteria such as methicillin-resistant Staphylococcus aureus (MRSA) and vancomycin-resistant Enterococcus (VRE).‍‍

== Discovery ==
The compound was identified unintentionally during investigations of the methylenomycin biosynthetic gene cluster in Streptomyces coelicolor, a bacterium found in soil.‍ Genetic blockade of a specific enzymatic step by deletion of the mmyE gene led to the accumulation and isolation of previously uncharacterized intermediates, including premethylenomycin C and its lactone derivative.‍‍

In the biosynthetic pathway that produces methylenomycin A, premethylenomycin C lactone is an early intermediate. Hydrolysis of the lactone ring followed by dehydration yields methylenomycin C, which is subsequently oxidized to form the epoxide methylenomycin A.‍

Metabolism of premethylenomycin C lactone

== Bioactivity ==
Compared with methylenomycin A and methylenomycin C, premethylenomycin C and its lactone precursor exhibit antimicrobial activity one to two orders of magnitude greater against a range of Gram-positive bacteria, including antibiotic-resistant isolates of Staphylococcus aureus and Enterococcus faecium.‍ They also do not have the α-methylene-γ-butyrolactone pharmacophore of methylenomycin A and C, implying they have a different mode of action.‍ These properties highlight the compounds in this metabolic series as potential lead structures for developing new antibiotics to combat antimicrobial resistance.‍

== Chemistry ==
Beyond its natural production, premethylenomycin C lactone can be prepared synthetically via a diastereoselective, phosphine-mediated (3 + 2) cycloaddition reaction, providing a route for larger‑scale preparation and structure–activity relationship studies.‍
