= Dimethoxybenzaldehyde =

Dimethoxybenzaldehyde may refer to:

- 2,4-Dimethoxybenzaldehyde (DMBA)
- 2,5-Dimethoxybenzaldehyde
- Veratraldehyde (3,4-dimethoxybenzaldehyde)
