= Caffeic =

Caffeic is an adjective referring to coffee (see also: Caffè the Italian word for it, written with two "f"). It can be found in:

- Caffeic acid, a hydroxycinnamic acid
- Caffeic aldehyde, a phenolic aldehyde contained in the seeds of Phytolacca americana
