= Morpheein =

Model of protein allosteric regulation

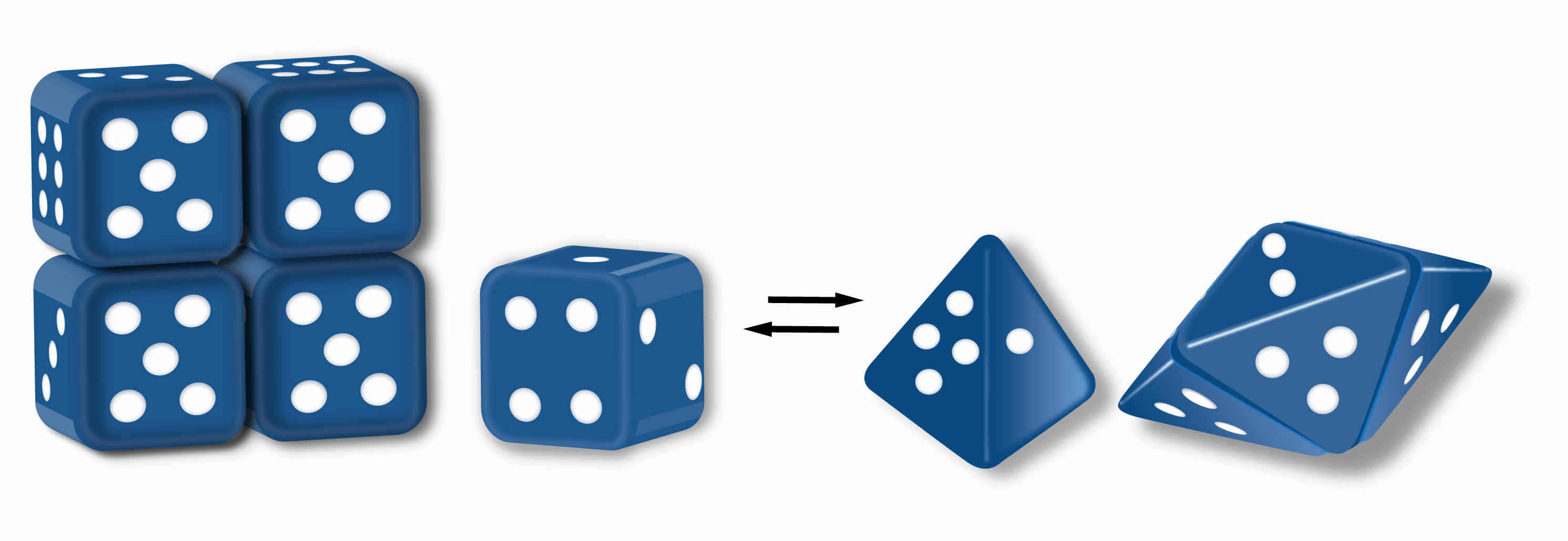
Proteins that function as morpheeins are illustrated using a dice analogy where one die can morph into two different shapes, cubic and tetrahedral. The illustrated assemblies apply a rule that the die face with one spot must contact the die face with four spots. To satisfy the rule for each die in an assembly, the cubic dice can only form a tetramer and the tetrahedral dice can only assemble to a pentamer. This is analogous to two different conformations (morpheein forms) of a protein subunit each dictating assembly to a different oligomer. All dice in one assembly must be of the same shape before assembly. Thus, for example, the tetramer must come apart, and its component dice must change shape to a pyramid before they can participate in assembly into a pentamer.

Morpheeins are proteins that can form two or more different homo-oligomers (morpheein forms), but must come apart and change shape to convert between forms. The alternate shape may reassemble to a different oligomer. The shape of the subunit dictates which oligomer is formed. Each oligomer has a finite number of subunits (stoichiometry). Morpheeins can interconvert between forms under physiological conditions and can exist as an equilibrium of different oligomers. These oligomers are physiologically relevant and are not misfolded protein; this distinguishes morpheeins from prions and amyloid. The different oligomers have distinct functionality. Interconversion of morpheein forms can be a structural basis for allosteric regulation, an idea noted many years ago, and later revived. A mutation that shifts the normal equilibrium of morpheein forms can serve as the basis for a conformational disease. Features of morpheeins can be exploited for drug discovery. The dice image (Fig 1) represents a morpheein equilibrium containing two different monomeric shapes that dictate assembly to a tetramer or a pentamer. The one protein that is established to function as a morpheein is porphobilinogen synthase, though there are suggestions throughout the literature that other proteins may function as morpheeins (for more information see "Table of Putative Morpheeins" below).

== Implications for drug discovery ==
Conformational differences between subunits of different oligomers and related functional differences of a morpheein provide a starting point for drug discovery. Protein function is dependent on the oligomeric form; therefore, the protein's function can be regulated by shifting the equilibrium of forms. A small molecule compound can shift the equilibrium either by blocking or favoring formation of one of the oligomers. The equilibrium can be shifted using a small molecule that has a preferential binding affinity for only one of the alternate morpheein forms. An inhibitor of porphobilinogen synthase with this mechanism of action has been documented.

== Implications for allosteric regulation ==
The morpheein model of allosteric regulation has similarities to and differences from other models. The concerted model (the Monod, Wyman and Changeux (MWC) model) of allosteric regulation requires all subunits to be in the same conformation or state within an oligomer like the morpheein model. However, neither this model nor the sequential model (Koshland, Nemethy, and Filmer model) takes into account that the protein may dissociate to interconvert between oligomers. Nonetheless, shortly after these theories were described, two groups of workers proposed what is now called the morpheein model and showed that it accounted for the regulatory behavior of glutamate dehydrogenase. Kurganov and Friedrich discussed models of this kind extensively in their books.

== Implications for teaching about protein structure-function relationships ==
It is generally taught that a given amino acid sequence will have only one physiologically relevant (native) quaternary structure; morpheeins challenge this concept. The morpheein model does not require gross changes in the basic protein fold. The conformational differences that accompany conversion between oligomers may be similar to the protein motions necessary for function of some proteins. The morpheein model highlights the importance of conformational flexibility for protein functionality and offers a potential explanation for proteins showing non-Michaelis-Menten kinetics, hysteresis, and/or protein concentration dependent specific activity.

== Implications for understanding the structural basis for disease ==
The term "conformational disease" generally encompasses mutations that result in misfolded proteins that aggregate, such as Alzheimer's and Creutzfeldt–Jakob diseases. In light of the discovery of morpheeins, however, this definition could be expanded to include mutations that shift an equilibrium of alternate oligomeric forms of a protein. An example of such a conformational disease is ALAD porphyria, which results from a mutation of porphobilinogen synthase that causes a shift in its morpheein equilibrium.

== Table of proteins whose published behavior is consistent with that of a morpheein ==
Protein	Example species	EC number	CAS number	Alternate oligomers	Evidence
Acetyl-CoA carboxylase-1	Gallus domesticus	EC 6.4.1.2	9023-93-2	inactive dimer, active dimer, larger	Effector molecules impact multimerization, Multiple/protein moonlighting functions
α-Acetylgalactosaminidase	Bos taurus	EC 4.3.2.2	9027-81-0	inactive monomer, active tetramer	Substrate binding/turnover impacts multimerization, Protein concentration dependent specific activity, Different assemblies have different activities, Conformationally distinct oligomeric forms.
Adenylosuccinate lyase	Bacillus subtilis	EC 4.3.2.2	9027-81-0	monomer, dimer, trimer, tetramer	Mutations shift the equilibrium of oligomers, Oligomer-dependent kinetic parameters, Protein concentration dependent molecular weight
Aristolochene synthase	Penicillium roqueforti	EC 4.2.3.9	94185-89-4	monomer, higher order	Protein concentration dependent specific activity
L-Asparaginase	Leptosphaeria michotii	EC 3.5.1.1	9015-68-3	dimer, tetramer, inactive octamer	Substrate binding/turnover impacts multimerization
Aspartokinase	Escherichia coli	EC 2.7.2.4 & EC 1.1.1.3	9012-50-4	monomer, dimer, tetramer	Multiple/protein moonlighting functions, Conformationally distinct oligomeric forms
ATPase of the ABCA1 transporter	Homo sapiens			dimer, tetramer	Substrate binding/turnover impacts multimerization
Biotin—(acetyl-CoA-carboxylase) ligase holoenzyme synthetase	Escherichia coli	EC 6.3.4.15	37340-95-7	monomer, dimer	Multiple/protein moonlighting functions, Different assemblies have different activities
Chorismate mutase	Escherichia coli	EC 5.4.99.5	9068-30-8	dimer, trimer, hexamer	Conformationally distinct oligomeric forms
Citrate synthase	Escherichia coli	EC 2.3.3.1	9027-96-7	monomer, dimer, trimer, tetramer, pentamer, hexamer, dodecamer	Substrate binding/turnover impacts multimerization, Characterized equilibrium of oligomers, Protein concentration dependent specific activity, pH-dependent oligomeric equilibrium
Cyanovirin-N	Nostoc ellipsosporum		918555-82-5	monomer and domain-swapped dimer	Characterized equilibrium of oligomers, Conformationally distinct oligomeric forms
3-oxoacid CoA-transferase	Sus scrofa domestica	EC 2.8.3.5	9027-43-4	dimer, tetramer	Chromatographically separable oligomers, Substrate might preferentially stabilize one form
Cystathionine β-synthase	Homo sapiens	EC 4.2.1.22	9023-99-8	multiple - ranges from dimer to 16-mer	Effector molecules impact multimerization, Mutations shift the equilibrium of oligomers, Different assemblies have different activities, disease-causing mutations at sites distant from active site
D-amino acid oxidase		EC 1.4.3.3	9000-88-8	monomers, dimers, higher-order oligomers	Oligomer-dependent kinetic parameters
Dihydrolipoamide dehydrogenase	Sus scrofa domestica	EC 1.8.1.4	9001-18-7	monomer, two different dimer forms, tetramer	Multiple/protein moonlighting functions, Different assemblies have different activities, pH-dependent oligomeric equilibrium, Conformationally distinct oligomeric forms
Dopamine β-monooxygenase	Bos taurus	EC 1.14.17.1	9013-38-1	dimers, tetramers	Effector molecules impact multimerization, Characterized equilibrium of oligomers, Oligomer-dependent kinetic parameters
Geranylgeranyl pyrophosphate synthase / Farnesyltranstransferase	Homo sapiens	EC 2.5.1.29	9032-58-0	hexamer, octamer	Effector molecules impact multimerization
GDP-mannose 6-dehydrogenase	Pseudomonas aeruginosa	EC 1.1.1.132	37250-63-8	trimer, 2 tetramers, and hexamer	Protein concentration dependent specific activity, Kinetic hysteresis
Glutamate dehydrogenase	Bos taurus	EC 1.4.1.2	9001-46-1	active & inactive hexamers, higher order	Effector molecules impact multimerization, Characterized equilibrium of oligomers
Glutamate racemase	Mycobacterium tuberculosis, Escherichia coli, Bacillus subtilis, Aquifex pyrophilus	EC 5.1.1.3	9024-08-02	monomer, 2 dimers, tetramer	Multiple/protein moonlighting functions, Characterized equilibrium of oligomers, Conformationally distinct oligomeric forms
Glyceraldehyde-3-phosphate dehydrogenase	Oryctolagus cuniculas, Sus scrofa domestica	EC 1.2.1.12 1.2.1.12	9001-50-7	monomer, dimer, tetramer Characterized equilibrium of oligomers, Different assemblies have different activities	
Glycerol kinase	Escherichia coli	EC 2.7.1.30	9030-66-4	monomer and 2 tetramers	Characterized equilibrium of oligomers, Conformationally distinct oligomeric forms, Effector functions by preventing domain motion
HIV-Integrase	Human immunodeficiency virus-1	EC 2.7.7.-		monomer, dimer, tetramer, higher order	Effector molecules impact multimerization, Multiple/protein moonlighting functions, Different assemblies have different activities
HPr-Kinase/phosphatase	Bacillus subtilis, Lactobacillus casei, Mycoplasma pneumoniae, Staphylococcus xylosus	EC 2.7.1.-/ EC 3.1.3.-	9026-43-1	monomers, dimers, trimers, hexamers	Effector molecules impact multimerization, Multiple/protein moonlighting functions, Different assemblies have different activities, pH-dependent oligomeric equilibrium
Lactate dehydrogenase	Bacillus stearothermophilus	EC 1.1.1.27	9001-60-9	2 dimers, tetramer	Effector molecules impact multimerization, Characterized equilibrium of oligomers, Protein concentration dependent specific activity, Mutations shift the equilibrium of oligomers, Oligomer-dependent kinetic parameters, Conformationally distinct oligomeric forms
Lon protease	Escherichia coli, Mycobacterium smegmatis	EC 3.4.21.53	79818-35-2	monomer, dimer, trimer, tetramer	Effector molecules impact multimerization, Substrate binding/turnover impacts multimerization, Protein concentration dependent specific activity, Kinetic hysteresis
Mitochondrial NAD(P)^{+} Malic enzyme / [[malate dehydrogenase (oxaloacetate-decarboxylating) (NADP^{+})]]	Homo sapiens	EC 1.1.1.40	9028-47-1	monomer, 2 dimers, tetramer	Effector molecules impact multimerization, Mutations shift the equilibrium of oligomers, Kinetic hysteresis,
Peroxiredoxins	Salmonella typhimurium	EC 1.6.4.- & EC 1.11.1.15	207137-51-7	2 dimers, decamer	Conformationally distinct oligomeric forms, Different assemblies have different activities
Phenylalanine hydroxylase	Homo sapiens	EC 1.14.16.1	9029-73-6	high activity tetramer, low activity tetramer	Substrate binding/turnover impacts multimerization, Conformationally distinct oligomeric forms
Phosphoenolpyruvate carboxylase	Escherichia coli, Zea mays	EC	9067-77-0	inactive dimer, active tetramer	Effector molecules impact multimerization, Characterized equilibrium of oligomers, Kinetic hysteresis, Conformationally distinct oligomeric forms
Phosphofructokinase	Bacillus stearothermophilus, Thermus thermophilus	EC 2.7.1.11	9001-80-3	inactive dimer, active tetramer	Effector molecules impact multimerization, Characterized equilibrium of oligomers
Polyphenol oxidase	Agaricus bisporus, Malus domestica, Lactuca sativa L.	EC 1.10.3.1	9002-10-2	monomer, trimer, tetramer, octamer, dodecamer	Multiple/protein moonlighting functions, Substrate binding/turnover impacts multimerization, Different assemblies have different activities, Kinetic hysteresis
Porphobilinogen synthase	Drosophila melanogaster, Danio rerio	EC 4.2.1.24	9036-37-7	dimer, hexamer, octamer	PBGS is the prototype morpheein.
Pyruvate kinase	Homo sapiens	EC 2.7.1.40	9001-59-6	active and inactive dimers, active tetramer, monomer, trimer, pentamer	Conformationally distinct oligomeric forms
Ribonuclease A	Bos taurus	EC 3.1.27.5 3.1.27.5	9901-99-4	monomer, dimer, trimer, tetramer, hexamer, pentamer, higher order	Multiple/protein moonlighting functions, Different assemblies have different activities, Conformationally distinct oligomeric forms
Ribonucleotide reductase	Mus musculus	EC 1.17.4.1	9047-64-7	tetramer, hexamer	Effector molecules impact multimerization
S-adenosyl-L-homocysteine hydrolase	Dictyostelium discoideum	EC 3.3.1.1	9025-54-1	tetramer and other	Effector molecules impact multimerization
Biodegrative threonine dehydratase / threonine ammonia-lyase	Escherichia coli	EC 4.3.1.19 4.3.1.19	774231-81-1	2 monomers, 2 tetramers	Effector molecules impact multimerization, Characterized equilibrium of oligomers, Different assemblies have different activities
β-Tryptase	Homo sapiens	EC 3.4.21.59	97501-93-4	active and inactive monomers, active and inactive tetramers	Protein concentration dependent specific activity, Characterized equilibrium of oligomers
Tumor necrosis factor-α	Homo sapiens		94948-61-5	monomer, dimer, trimer	Different assemblies have different activities
Uracil phosphoribosyltransferase	Escherichia coli	EC 2.4.2.9	9030-24-4	trimer, pentamer	Effector molecules impact multimerization, Substrate binding/turnover impacts multimerization, Different assemblies have different activities
