= S-SodF RNA =

SodF sRNA
- Predicted secondary structure and sequence conservation of SodF small RNA

Identifiers
- Rfam: RF02790

Other data
- Domain(s): Bacteria
- GO: GO:0017148, GO:0003729, GO:0043488
- SO: SO:0000370
- PDB structures: PDBe

s-SodF RNA is a non-coding RNA (ncRNA) molecule identified in Streptomyces coelicolor. It is produced from sodF mRNA by cleavage of about 90 nucleotides from its 3′UTR. However it does not affect the function of sodF mRNA, but It acts on another mRNA called sodN. s-SodF RNA has a sequence complementary to sodN mRNA from the 5′-end up to the ribosome binding site. It pairs with sodN mRNA, blocks its translation and facilitates sodN mRNA decay. In Streptomyces sodF and sodN genes produce FeSOD and NiSOD superoxide dismutases containing Fe and Ni respectively. Their expression is inversely regulated by nickel-specific Fur-family regulator called Nur. When Ni is present Nur directly represses sodF transcription, and indirectly induces sodN.
