= Methylenomycin =

Index of chemical compounds with the same name.

Methylenomycin may refer to:

- Methylenomycin A
- Methylenomycin B
- Methylenomycin C
