= DMBA =

DMBA may refer to:

- 2,4-Dimethoxybenzaldehyde, a reagent used to specifically quantify phlorotannins
- para-Dimethylaminobenzaldehyde, a reagent used in Ehrlich's reagent and Kovac's reagent
- 7,12-Dimethylbenz(a)anthracene, an immunosuppressant and powerful laboratory carcinogen
- 1,3-Dimethylbutylamine, a designer stimulant sometimes found in dietary supplements
