= Proline racemase =

proline racemase

Identifiers
- EC no.: 5.1.1.4
- CAS no.: 9024-09-3

Databases
- IntEnz: IntEnz view
- BRENDA: BRENDA entry
- ExPASy: NiceZyme view
- KEGG: KEGG entry
- MetaCyc: metabolic pathway
- PRIAM: profile
- PDB structures: RCSB PDB PDBe PDBsum
- Gene Ontology: AmiGO / QuickGO
Search
- PMC: articles
- PubMed: articles
- NCBI: proteins

Proline racemase

Identifiers
- Symbol: Pro_racemase
- Pfam: PF05544
- InterPro: IPR008794
Available protein structures:
- PDB: 2azpA:6-313 1tm0B:9-333 IPR008794 PF05544 (ECOD; PDBsum)
- AlphaFold: IPR008794; PF05544

In enzymology, a proline racemase (EC 5.1.1.4) is an enzyme that catalyzes the chemical reaction

L-proline $\rightleftharpoons$ D-proline

Hence, this enzyme has two substrates, L- and D-proline, and two products, D- and L- proline.

This enzyme belongs to the family of proline racemases acting on free amino acids. The systematic name of this enzyme class is proline racemase. This enzyme participates in arginine and proline metabolism. These enzymes catalyse the interconversion of L- and D-proline in bacteria.

== Species distribution ==
This first eukaryotic proline racemase was identified in Trypanosoma cruzi and fully characterized Q9NCP4. The parasite enzyme, TcPRAC, is as a co-factor-independent proline racemase and displays B-cell mitogenic properties when released by T. cruzi upon infection, contributing to parasite escape.

Novel proline racemases of medical and veterinary importance were described respectively in Clostridioides difficile (bacteria) (Q17ZY4) and Trypanosoma vivax (B8LFE4). These studies showed that a peptide motif used as a minimal pattern signature to identify putative proline racemases (motif III*) is insufficient stringent per se to discriminate proline racemases from 4-hydroxyproline epimerases (HyPRE). Also, additional, non-dissociated elements that account for the discrimination of these enzymes were identified, based for instance on polarity constraints imposed by specific residues of the catalytic pockets. Based on those elements, enzymes incorrectly described as proline racemases were biochemically proved to be hydroxyproline epimerases (i.e. HyPREs from Pseudomonas aeruginosa (Q9I476), Burkholderia pseudomallei (Q63NG7), Brucella abortus (Q57B94), Brucella suis (Q8FYS0) and Brucella melitensis (Q8YJ29).

== Structural studies ==
The biochemical mechanism of proline racemase was first put forward in the late sixties by Cardinale and Abeles using the Clostridium sticklandii enzyme, CsPRAC. The catalytic mechanism of proline racemase was late revisited by Buschiazzo, Goytia and collaborators that, in 2006, resolved the structure of the parasite TcPRAC co-crystallyzed with its known competitive inhibitor - pyrrole carboxylic acid (PYC). Those studies showed that each active enzyme contains two catalytic pockets. Isothermal titration calorimetry then showed that two molecules of PYC associate with TcPRAC in solution, and that this association is time-dependent and most probably based on mechanism of negative cooperativity. Complementary biochemical findings are consistent with the presence of two active catalytic sites per homodimer, each pertaining to one enzyme subunit, challenging the previously proposed mechanism of one catalytic site per homodimer previously proposed.

== Mechanism ==
The proline racemase active site contains two general bases, each of them a Cys, located on either side of the alpha-carbon of the substrate. In order to work properly, one Cys must be protonated (a thiol, RSH) and the other must be deprotonated (a thiolate, RS–).

== Inhibition ==
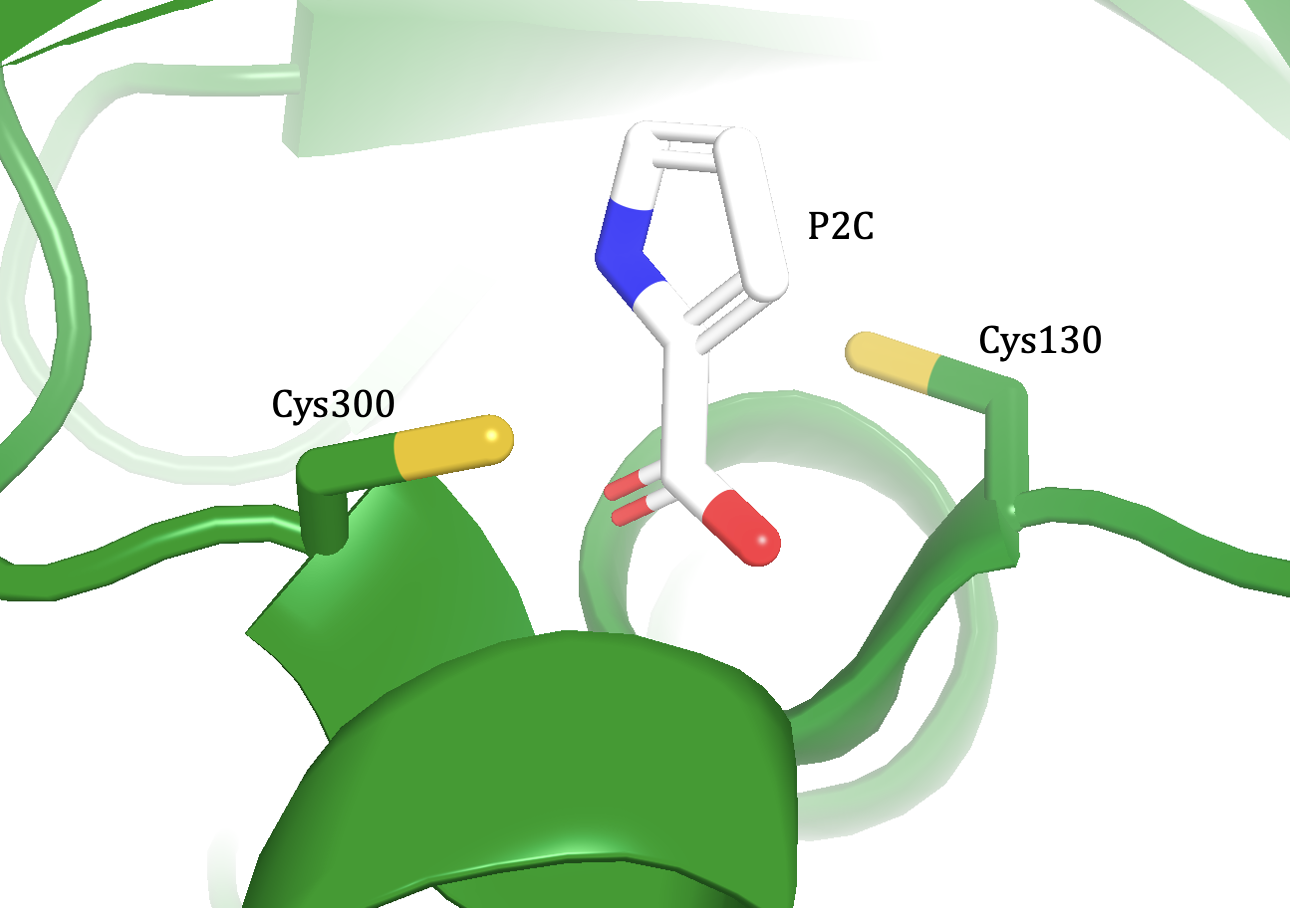
Proline racemase active site with P2C (PDB:1W61)

Proline racemase is inhibited by pyrrole-2-carboxylic acid (P2C), a transition state analogue that is flat like the transition state. P2C acts as a competitive inhibitor, due to the chemical's similarity to the transition state of the natural proline substrate. Inhibition of the active site Cys130 and Cys300 residues prevents the conversion of proline enantiomers. Pyrrole-2-carboxylic acid (P2C) reveals the presence of one catalytic center per monomer, with two Cys residues present to perform acid/base catalysis, utilizing a carbanion stabilization mechanism. The catalytic residues are 3.5 angstroms away from the molecule of P2C.
