= Uracil phosphoribosyltransferase =

Class of enzymes

Uridine phosphorylase

Identifiers
- EC no.: 2.4.2.9

Databases
- BRENDA: enzyme data
- ExPASy: NiceZyme view
- KEGG: enzyme entry
- MetaCyc: metabolic pathway
- Rhea: reactions
- PDB structures: RCSB PDB PDBe PDBsum
Search
- PMC: articles
- PubMed: articles
- NCBI: proteins

Uracil phosphoribosyltransferase is an enzyme found in yeast and bacteria which interconverts uridine monophosphate with uracil and phosphoribosyl pyrophosphate. In the forward direction shown, pyrophosphoric acid is added to the ribose sugar unit to cleave off the attached heterocycle.

uridine monophosphate
PP_{i}
PP_{i}
phosphoribosyl pyrophosphate
+
uracil

This protein is thought to use the morpheein model of allosteric regulation.

== Mammalian ortholog ==
UPRT

Identifiers
- Aliases: UPRT, FUR1, UPP, uracil phosphoribosyltransferase homolog
- External IDs: OMIM: 300656; MGI: 2685620; GeneCards: UPRT

Gene location (Human)
Chr.	X chromosome (human)
Band	Xq13.3	Start	75,156,388 bp
Band	Xq13.3	End	75,304,885 bp

Gene location (Mouse)
Chr.	X chromosome (mouse)
Band	X|X D	Start	103,526,424 bp
Band	X|X D	End	103,551,096 bp
RNA expression pattern
Bgee	Human / Mouse (ortholog); Top expressed in: myocardium of left ventricle; islet of Langerhans; Achilles tendon; monocyte; duodenum; palpebral conjunctiva; right adrenal cortex; cardiac muscle tissue of right atrium; olfactory zone of nasal mucosa; nasal epithelium / Top expressed in: jejunum; ileum; tail of embryo; secondary oocyte; zygote; primary oocyte; ganglionic eminence; quadriceps femoris muscle; esophagus; muscle of thigh; More reference expression data
BioGPS	n/a
Gene ontology
Molecular function	nucleotide binding; GTP binding; uridine kinase activity; protein binding; kinase activity
Cellular component	cytoplasm; cytosol; nucleus
Biological process	pyrimidine nucleoside salvage; response to insulin; female pregnancy; lactation; pyrimidine nucleobase metabolic process; UMP biosynthetic process; nucleoside metabolic process; phosphorylation
Sources:Amigo / QuickGO
Orthologs
Databases	NCBI: entry; OMA: entry
Species	Human	Mouse
Entrez	139596	331487
Ensembl	ENSG00000094841	ENSMUSG00000073016
UniProt	Q96BW1	B1AVZ0
RefSeq (mRNA)	NM_001307944; NM_145052; NM_001363821	NM_001081189
RefSeq (protein)	NP_001294873; NP_659489; NP_001350750	NP_001074658
Location (UCSC)	Chr X: 75.16 – 75.3 Mb	Chr X: 103.53 – 103.55 Mb
PubMed search
- Wikidata
View/Edit Human	View/Edit Mouse

Uracil phosphoribosyltransferase homolog is a protein encoded by the UPRT gene in humans which is an ortholog of the enzyme found in yeast. However, in humans and mice, it lacks the uracil binding region found in the functional enzyme, and no uracil phosphoribosyltransferase activity has been detected.
