= Serine racemase =

Protein-coding gene in the species Homo sapiens

SRR
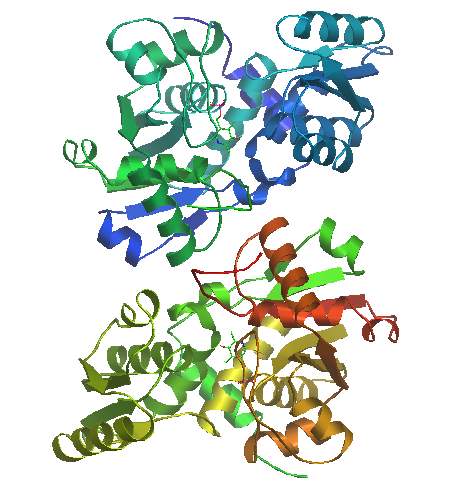

Identifiers
- Aliases: SRR, ILV1, ISO1, serine racemase
- External IDs: OMIM: 606477; MGI: 1351636; GeneCards: SRR
Available structures
PDB	Ortholog search: PDBe RCSB
PDB	List of PDB id codes 3L6B, 3L6R
Enzyme activity
EC #	BRENDA	ExPASy	KEGG	MetaCyc
4.3.1.17	↗	↗	↗	↗
4.3.1.18	↗	↗	↗	↗
5.1.1.18	↗	↗	↗	↗

Gene location (Human)
Chr.	Chromosome 17 (human)
Band	17p13.3	Start	2,303,383 bp
Band	17p13.3	End	2,325,260 bp

Gene location (Mouse)
Chr.	Chromosome 11 (mouse)
Band	11|11 B5	Start	74,797,185 bp
Band	11|11 B5	End	74,816,774 bp
RNA expression pattern
Bgee	Human / Mouse (ortholog); Top expressed in: ganglionic eminence; ventricular zone; testicle; gonad; gastric mucosa; muscle of thigh; gastrocnemius muscle; islet of Langerhans; stromal cell of endometrium; hair follicle / Top expressed in: Region I of hippocampus proper; right kidney; dentate gyrus of hippocampal formation granule cell; intercostal muscle; primary visual cortex; superior frontal gyrus; left lobe of liver; proximal tubule; human kidney; ciliary body; More reference expression data
BioGPS	n/a
Gene ontology
Molecular function	threonine racemase activity; nucleotide binding; calcium ion binding; PDZ domain binding; protein homodimerization activity; L-serine ammonia-lyase activity; isomerase activity; glycine binding; metal ion binding; catalytic activity; lyase activity; pyridoxal phosphate binding; ATP binding; magnesium ion binding; D-serine ammonia-lyase activity; serine racemase activity
Cellular component	cytoplasm; plasma membrane; apical part of cell; soma; cytosol
Biological process	response to organic cyclic compound; serine family amino acid metabolic process; L-serine metabolic process; cellular amino acid metabolic process; D-serine metabolic process; ageing; pyruvate biosynthetic process; response to morphine; response to lipopolysaccharide; D-serine biosynthetic process; metabolism; protein homotetramerization; brain development; L-serine biosynthetic process
Sources:Amigo / QuickGO
Orthologs
Databases	NCBI: entry; OMA: entry
Species	Human	Mouse
Entrez	63826	27364
Ensembl	ENSG00000167720	ENSMUSG00000001323
UniProt	Q9GZT4	Q9QZX7
RefSeq (mRNA)	NM_001304803; NM_021947	NM_001163311; NM_013761; NM_001362742; NM_001362743; NM_001362744
RefSeq (protein)	NP_001291732; NP_068766	NP_001156783; NP_038789; NP_001349671; NP_001349672; NP_001349673
Location (UCSC)	Chr 17: 2.3 – 2.33 Mb	Chr 11: 74.8 – 74.82 Mb
PubMed search
- Wikidata
View/Edit Human	View/Edit Mouse

Serine racemase (SR, EC 5.1.1.18) is the first racemase enzyme in human biology to be identified. This enzyme converts L-serine to its enantiomer form, D-serine. D-serine acts as a neuronal signaling molecule by activating NMDA receptors in the brain.

Since NMDA receptors Dysfunction has been suggested as one of the promising hypotheses for the pathophysiology of schizophrenia, it has been shown that underexpression of this enzyme is an indicator, especially for the paranoid subtype. Treatment of schizophrenia with D-serine has been shown to play some role in ameliorating some symptoms.

In humans, the serine racemase protein is encoded by the SRR gene. Serine racemase may have evolved from L-threo-hydroxyaspartate (L-THA) eliminase and served as the precursor to aspartate racemase.

Mammalian serine racemase is a pyridoxal 5'-phosphate dependent enzyme that catalyzes both the racemization of L-serine to D-serine and also the elimination of water from L-serine, generating pyruvate and ammonia through the β-elimination of L-serine. This makes serine a known bifurcating enzyme. The β-elimination pathway is thought to serve as a bleed valve that allows local stores of L-serine to be diverted away from D-serine as a means of muting the D-serine signaling pathway. The canonical tetraglycine loop that serves as a PLP phosphate binding pocket includes the active residues being F55, K56, G185, G186, G187, G188, and S313.

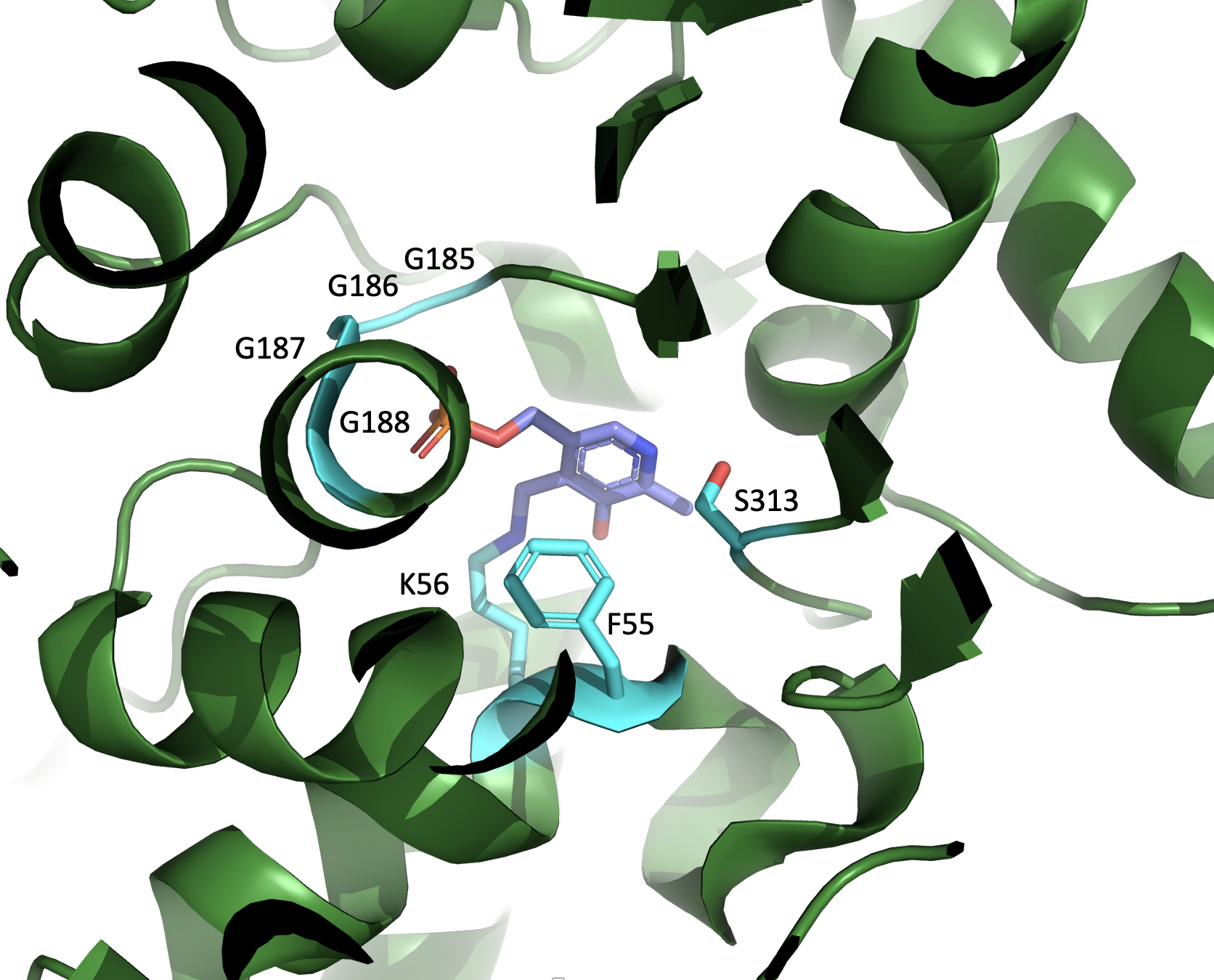
PLP in serine racemase

The enzyme is physiologically stimulated by divalent cations (e.g., magnesium) and is allosterically activated by the magnesium/ATP complex, associated with a conformational change upon nucleotide binding that depends upon interactions with Q89. The canonical coordination sphere of the divalent cation interaction site includes the active residues E210 and D216 within 2.1 angstroms of the ion.

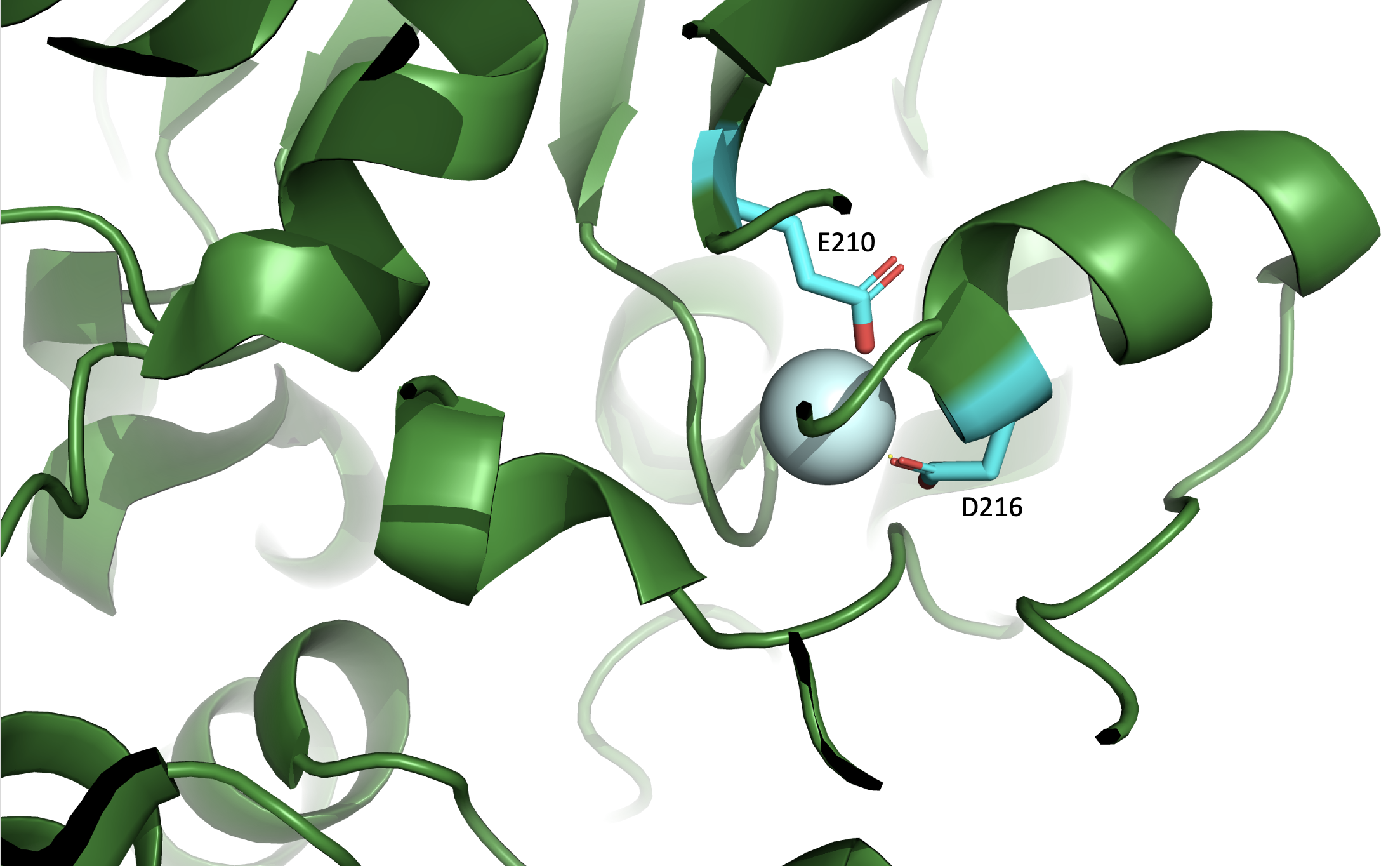
Divalent cation (Mn) in serine racemase
