= GDP-mannose 6-dehydrogenase =

Class of enzymes

Identifiers
- EC no.: 1.1.1.132
- CAS no.: 37250-63-8

Databases
- IntEnz: IntEnz view
- BRENDA: BRENDA entry
- ExPASy: NiceZyme view
- KEGG: KEGG entry
- MetaCyc: metabolic pathway
- PRIAM: profile
- PDB structures: RCSB PDB PDBe PDBsum
- Gene Ontology: AmiGO / QuickGO
Search
- PMC: articles
- PubMed: articles
- NCBI: proteins

In enzymology, a GDP-mannose 6-dehydrogenase (EC 1.1.1.132) is an enzyme that catalyzes the chemical reaction

GDP-D-mannose + 2 NAD^{+} + H_{2}O $\rightleftharpoons$ GDP-D-mannuronate + 2 NADH + 2 H^{+}

The 3 substrates of this enzyme are GDP-D-mannose, NAD^{+}, and H_{2}O, whereas its 3 products are GDP-D-mannuronate, NADH, and H^{+}.

This enzyme belongs to the family of oxidoreductases, specifically those acting on the CH-OH group of donor with NAD^{+} or NADP^{+} as acceptor. The systematic name of this enzyme class is GDP-D-mannose:NAD^{+} 6-oxidoreductase. Other names in common use include guanosine diphosphomannose dehydrogenase, GDP-mannose dehydrogenase, guanosine diphosphomannose dehydrogenase, and guanosine diphospho-D-mannose dehydrogenase. This enzyme participates in fructose and mannose metabolism.

This protein may use the morpheein model of allosteric regulation.

== Structural studies ==
As of late 2007, 3 structures have been solved for this class of enzymes, with PDB accession codes 1MFZ, 1MUU, and 1MV8.
