= Methylenomycin B =

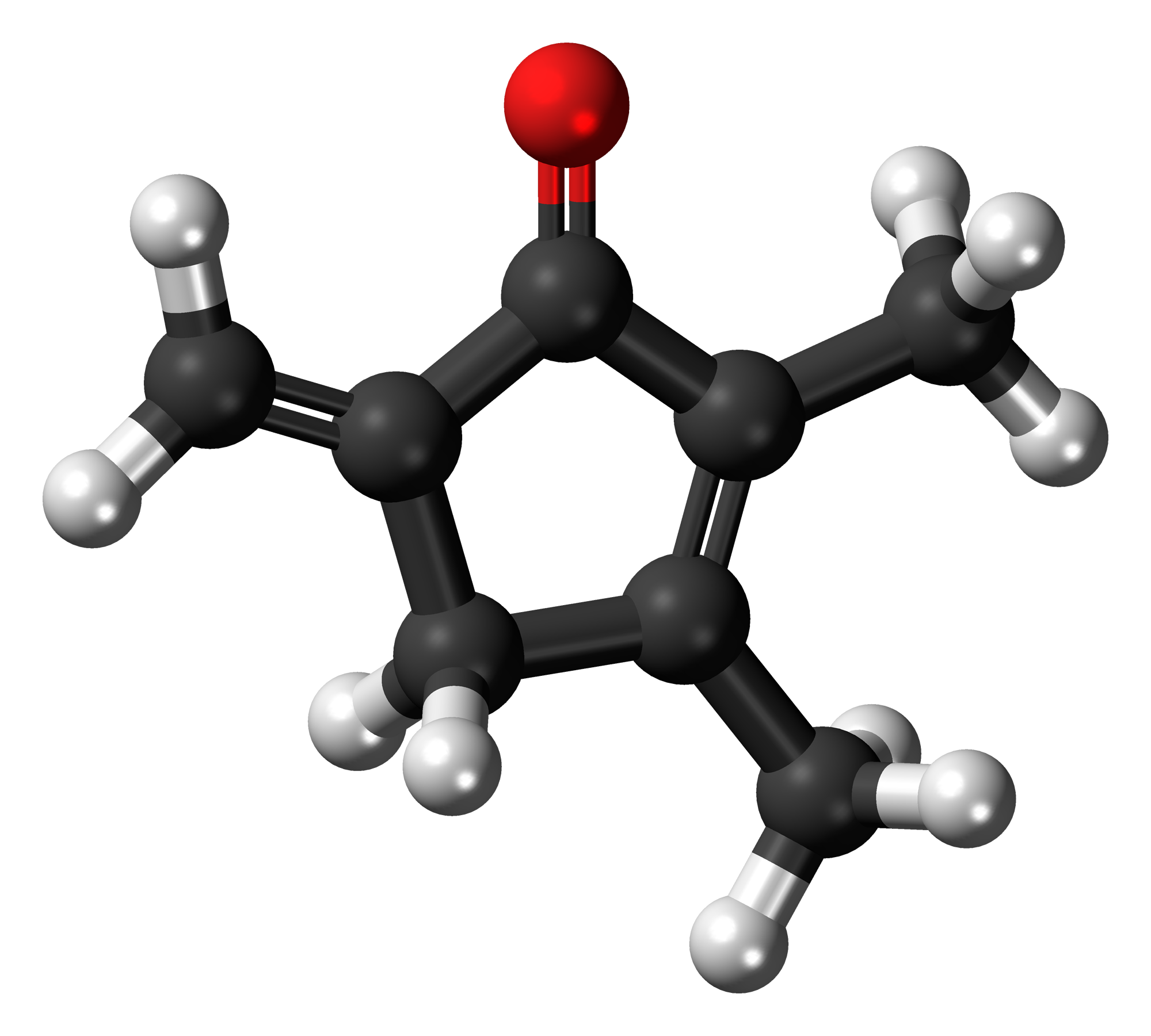

Names
- IUPAC name 2,3-Dimethyl-5-methylene-2-cyclopenten-1-one

Identifiers
CAS Number	52775-77-6
3D model (JSmol)	Interactive image
ChemSpider	2303992
PubChem CID	3040648
UNII	WLO3E84KAS
CompTox Dashboard (EPA)	DTXSID50200755
- InChI: InChI=1S/C8H10O/c1-5-4-6(2)8(9)7(5)3/h2,4H2,1,3H3 Key: YDXIEAHUYZKJOH-UHFFFAOYSA-N; InChI=1/C8H10O/c1-5-4-6(2)8(9)7(5)3/h2,4H2,1,3H3 Key: YDXIEAHUYZKJOH-UHFFFAOYAN
- SMILES: O=C/1\C(=C)CC(=C\1C)\C

Properties
Chemical formula	C_{8}H_{10}O
Molar mass	122.167 g·mol^{−1}
- Except where otherwise noted, data are given for materials in their standard state (at 25 °C [77 °F], 100 kPa). verify (what is ?) Infobox references

Methylenomycin B is a cyclopentanone derived antibiotic produced by Streptomyces coelicolor A3(2) that is effective against both Gram-negative and Gram-positive bacteria. It is the decarboxylated analog of methylenomycin C.

== See also ==
- Methylenomycin A
