= Constance Jeffery =

American biophyicist

- Education: Massachusetts Institute of Technology, University of California, Berkeley
- Occupation: Associate Professor
- Scientific career
- Workplaces: University of Illinois Chicago
- Thesis: E. coli chemotaxis receptors : I. Effect of mutations in the aspartate receptor second transmembrane domain; II. Computer-based homology modelling of the serine receptor ligand-binding domain (1992)

Constance Joan Jeffery is an American biophysicist and an associate professor of biological sciences at the University of Illinois Chicago. She was elected a fellow of the American Association for the Advancement of Science in 2022. Jeffery is known for her work with multifunctional proteins.

== Early life and career ==
Jeffery was drawn to science and math from a young age, with gene cloning in magazines like Time driving an interest in understanding how these discoveries could further scientific knowledge. Jeffery earned her Bachelor of Science degree from Massachusetts Institute of Technology in 1987 with initial lab experience in chemistry and immunology. She earned her Ph.D. in 1993 in Douglas Koshland's lab at the University of California, Berkeley where she worked on better understanding protein structure and function. Following her Ph.D., she was a postdoctoral fellow at Brandeis University and Tufts University School of Medicine. In 1999 she moved to the University of Illinois Chicago, where she was promoted to associate professor in 2005.

== Research ==
Jeffery applies several biochemical and biophysical techniques in her research including x-ray crystallography, ligand binding assays and catalytic activity assays. Jeffery is known for her work describing multi-functional proteins, which she termed moonlighting proteins, which are proteins with a single polypeptide chain that have multiple functions. Jeffery has used crystallography to investigate proteins, and examined how multifunctional proteins can assist with treatments for cancer.

== Selected publications ==
- Jeffery, Constance J. (1999-01-01). "Moonlighting proteins". Trends in Biochemical Sciences. 24 (1): 8–11. doi:10.1016/S0968-0004(98)01335-8. ISSN 0968-0004. PMID 10087914.
- Jeffery, Constance J. (2003-08-01). "Moonlighting proteins: old proteins learning new tricks". Trends in Genetics. 19 (8): 415–417. doi:10.1016/S0168-9525(03)00167-7. ISSN 0168-9525. PMID 12902157.
- Zwicke, Grant L.; Ali Mansoori, G.; Jeffery, Constance J. (2012). "Utilizing the folate receptor for active targeting of cancer nanotherapeutics". Nano Reviews. 3 (1) 18496. doi:10.3402/nano.v3i0.18496. ISSN 2000-5121. PMC 3521101. PMID 23240070.
- Jeffery, Constance J (2004-12-01). "Molecular mechanisms for multitasking: recent crystal structures of moonlighting proteins". Current Opinion in Structural Biology. 14 (6): 663–668. doi:10.1016/j.sbi.2004.10.001. ISSN 0959-440X. PMID 15582389.

== Awards and honors ==
In 2022 Jeffrey was elected to join the 2021 class of fellows for the American Association for the Advancement of Science for her work with proteins.
