= Epi-isozizaene 5-monooxygenase =

Class of enzymes

Identifiers
- EC no.: 1.14.15.39
- CAS no.: 1207718-51-1

Databases
- IntEnz: IntEnz view
- BRENDA: BRENDA entry
- ExPASy: NiceZyme view
- KEGG: KEGG entry
- MetaCyc: metabolic pathway
- PRIAM: profile
- PDB structures: RCSB PDB PDBe PDBsum
Search
- PMC: articles
- PubMed: articles
- NCBI: proteins

Epi-isozizaene 5-monooxygenase (EC 1.14.15.39, CYP170A1) is an enzyme with systematic name (+)-epi-isozizaene,NADPH:oxygen oxidoreductase (5-hydroxylating). This enzyme catalyses the following overall chemical reaction:

(+)-epi-isozizaene
+ 4 reduced
ferredoxin
2 O_{2}
3 H_{2}O
albaflavenone
+ 4 oxidised
ferredoxin

The enzyme from Streptomyces coelicolor is an oxidoreductase which uses molecular oxygen to insert a hydroxy group into (+)-epi-isozizaene and then further oxidises that intermediate to the ketone product. It requires ferredoxin to transfer electrons to the cytochrome P450 active site.
