= Caffeyl alcohol =

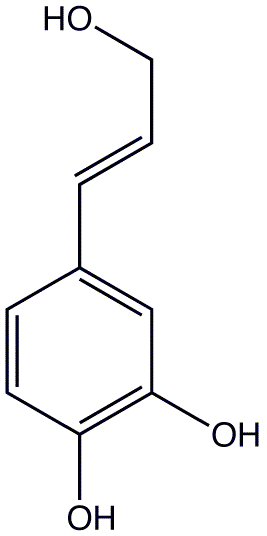

Names
- Preferred IUPAC name 4-[(1E)-3-Hydroxyprop-1-en-1-yl]benzene-1,2-diol
- Other names Caffeyl alcohol, Caffeoyl alcohol, 3,4-Dihydroxycinnamyl alcohol

Identifiers
CAS Number	3598-26-3
3D model (JSmol)	Interactive image
ChEBI	CHEBI:86071
ChEMBL	ChEMBL1321891
ChemSpider	4445310
PubChem CID	5282096
UNII	P5Y9E2Q5EQ
CompTox Dashboard (EPA)	DTXSID801027142
- InChI: InChI=1S/C9H10O3/c10-5-1-2-7-3-4-8(11)9(12)6-7/h1-4,6,10-12H,5H2/b2-1+ Key: ZCKDCRKBURQZPT-OWOJBTEDSA-N
- SMILES: OC\C=C\c1ccc(O)c(O)c1

Properties
Chemical formula	C_{9}H_{10}O_{3}
Appearance	White solid
Melting point	144 to 145 °C (291 to 293 °F; 417 to 418 K)
Solubility in water	moderate
- Except where otherwise noted, data are given for materials in their standard state (at 25 °C [77 °F], 100 kPa). verify (what is ?) Infobox references

Caffeyl alcohol is the organic compound with the formula (HO)_{2}C_{6}H_{3}-4-CHCHCH_{2}OH. This colourless solid is related to catechol by attachment to allyl alcohol. It is the precursor to one of the three principal lignols.

== Preparation and occurrence ==
In the laboratory, caffeyl alcohol can be synthesized from 3,4-dihydroxybenzaldehyde. It is an intermediate in the biosynthesis of coniferyl alcohol, the conversion being effected by caffeate O-methyltransferase.

== Related compounds ==
Two related compounds are caffeyl aldehyde and caffeic acid, the latter also being a minor component of coffee.
