= LigD =

Multifunctional non-homologous end joining protein LigD

Identifiers
- Organism: Mycolicibacterium smegmatis ATCC 700084
- Symbol: ligD
- UniProt: A0R3R7
Search for
- Structures: Swiss-model
- Domains: InterPro

LigD is a multifunctional ligase/polymerase/nuclease (3'-phosphoesterase) found in bacterial non-homologous end joining (NHEJ) DNA repair systems. It is much more error-prone than the more complex eukaryotic system of NHEJ, which uses multiple enzymes to fill its role. The polymerase preferentially use rNTPs (RNA nucleotides), possibly advantageous in dormant cells.

The actual architecture of LigD is variable.

- The LigD homolog in Bacillus subtilis does not have the nuclease domain.
- LigD with its ligase domain artificially removed can perform its function (with loss of fidelity) with a separate LigC acting as the ligase.
- The LigD homolog in the archaeon Methanocella paludicola is broken into three single-domain proteins sharing an operon.
