= Caffeic aldehyde =

Names
- Preferred IUPAC name (2E)-3-(3,4-Dihydroxyphenyl)prop-2-enal
- Other names Caffeoyl aldehyde 3,4-Dihydroxycinnamaldehyde; Caffeyl aldehyde cis-Caffeic aldehyde trans-Caffeic aldehyde 3-(3,4-Dihydroxyphenyl)acrylaldehyde

Identifiers
CAS Number	141632-15-7; 68149-78-0 (non-specific)
3D model (JSmol)	Interactive image
ChEBI	CHEBI:28323
ChEMBL	ChEMBL17291
ChemSpider	391335
EC Number	872-858-1
KEGG	C10945
PubChem CID	5281871
UNII	2A5UNB3LNK
CompTox Dashboard (EPA)	DTXSID401032315
- InChI: InChI=1S/C9H8O3/c10-5-1-2-7-3-4-8(11)9(12)6-7/h1-6,11-12H/b2-1+ Key: AXMVYSVVTMKQSL-OWOJBTEDSA-N
- SMILES: C1=CC(=C(C=C1C=CC=O)O)O

Properties
Chemical formula	C_{9}H_{8}O_{3}
Molar mass	164.160 g·mol^{−1}

Hazards
- GHS labelling
Pictograms	(GHS07: Exclamation mark)
Signal word	Warning
Hazard statements	H315, H319, H335
Precautionary statements	P261, P264, P264+P265, P271, P280, P302+P352, P304+P340, P305+P351+P338, P319, P321, P332+P317, P337+P317, P362+P364, P403+P233, P405, P501
- Except where otherwise noted, data are given for materials in their standard state (at 25 °C [77 °F], 100 kPa). Infobox references

Caffeic aldehyde is a phenolic aldehyde contained in the seeds of Phytolacca americana (American pokeweed). It is present in various parts of a large number of plants, such as the seeds of Phytolacca americana. It can be poisonous, especially to children.

== See also ==
- Caffeic acid
- Caffeyl alcohol
