= Actinorhodin =

Names
- Preferred IUPAC name 2,2′-[(1R,1′R,3S,3′S)-5,5′,10,10′-Tetrahydroxy-6,6′,9,9′-tetraoxo-3,3′,4,4′,6,6′,9,9′-octahydro-1H,1′H-[8,8′-binaphtho[2,3-c]pyran]-3,3′-diyl]diacetic acid

Identifiers
CAS Number	1397-77-9
3D model (JSmol)	Interactive image
Beilstein Reference	76401
ChEBI	CHEBI:2448
ChemSpider	16735642
KEGG	C06691
PubChem CID	5280985
UNII	G4HH387T6Z
CompTox Dashboard (EPA)	DTXSID20930557
- InChI: InChI=1S/C32H26O14/c1-9-21-15(3-11(45-9)5-19(35)36)29(41)23-17(33)7-13(27(39)25(23)31(21)43)14-8-18(34)24-26(28(14)40)32(44)22-10(2)46-12(6-20(37)38)4-16(22)30(24)42/h7-12,33-34,39-40H,3-6H2,1-2H3,(H,35,36)(H,37,38)/t9-,10-,11+,12+/m1/s1 Key: VTIKDEXOEJDMJP-WYUUTHIRSA-N; InChI=1/C32H26O14/c1-9-21-15(3-11(45-9)5-19(35)36)29(41)23-17(33)7-13(27(39)25(23)31(21)43)14-8-18(34)24-26(28(14)40)32(44)22-10(2)46-12(6-20(37)38)4-16(22)30(24)42/h7-12,33-34,39-40H,3-6H2,1-2H3,(H,35,36)(H,37,38)/t9-,10-,11+,12+/m1/s1 Key: VTIKDEXOEJDMJP-WYUUTHIRBL
- SMILES: OC(=O)C[C@@H]5CC=6C(=O)c4c(O)cc(c3cc(O)c2C(=O)C=1C[C@@H](CC(O)=O)O[C@H](C)C=1C(=O)c2c3O)c(O)c4C(=O)C=6[C@@H](C)O5

Properties
Chemical formula	C_{32}H_{26}O_{14}
Molar mass	634.546 g·mol^{−1}
- Except where otherwise noted, data are given for materials in their standard state (at 25 °C [77 °F], 100 kPa). verify (what is ?) Infobox references

Actinorhodin is a benzoisochromanequinone dimer polyketide antibiotic produced by Streptomyces coelicolor. The antibiotic effect of the substance was first noticed in 1947, when it was noted to inhibit the growth of S. aureus; with the full structure being described in 1966. The gene cluster responsible for actinorhodin production contains the biosynthetic enzymes and genes responsible for export of the antibiotic. The antibiotic also has the effect of being a pH indicator due to its pH-dependent color change. It is a product of a Type II polyketide synthase biosynthetic pathway.
