= 4-hydroxyproline epimerase =

Class of enzymes

Identifiers
- EC no.: 5.1.1.8
- CAS no.: 9024-23-1

Databases
- IntEnz: IntEnz view
- BRENDA: BRENDA entry
- ExPASy: NiceZyme view
- KEGG: KEGG entry
- MetaCyc: metabolic pathway
- PRIAM: profile
- PDB structures: RCSB PDB PDBe PDBsum
- Gene Ontology: AmiGO / QuickGO
Search
- PMC: articles
- PubMed: articles
- NCBI: proteins

In enzymology, a 4-hydroxyproline epimerase (EC 5.1.1.8) is an enzyme that catalyzes the chemical reaction

trans-4-hydroxy-L-proline $\rightleftharpoons$ cis-4-hydroxy-D-proline

Hence, this enzyme has one substrate, trans-4-hydroxy-L-proline, and one product, cis-4-hydroxy-D-proline.

This enzyme belongs to the family of isomerases, specifically those racemases and epimerases acting on amino acids and derivatives. The systematic name of this enzyme class is 4-hydroxyproline 2-epimerase. Other names in common use include hydroxyproline epimerase, hydroxyproline 2-epimerase, and L-hydroxyproline epimerase. This enzyme participates in arginine and proline metabolism.
