= 2,5-Dimethoxybenzaldehyde =

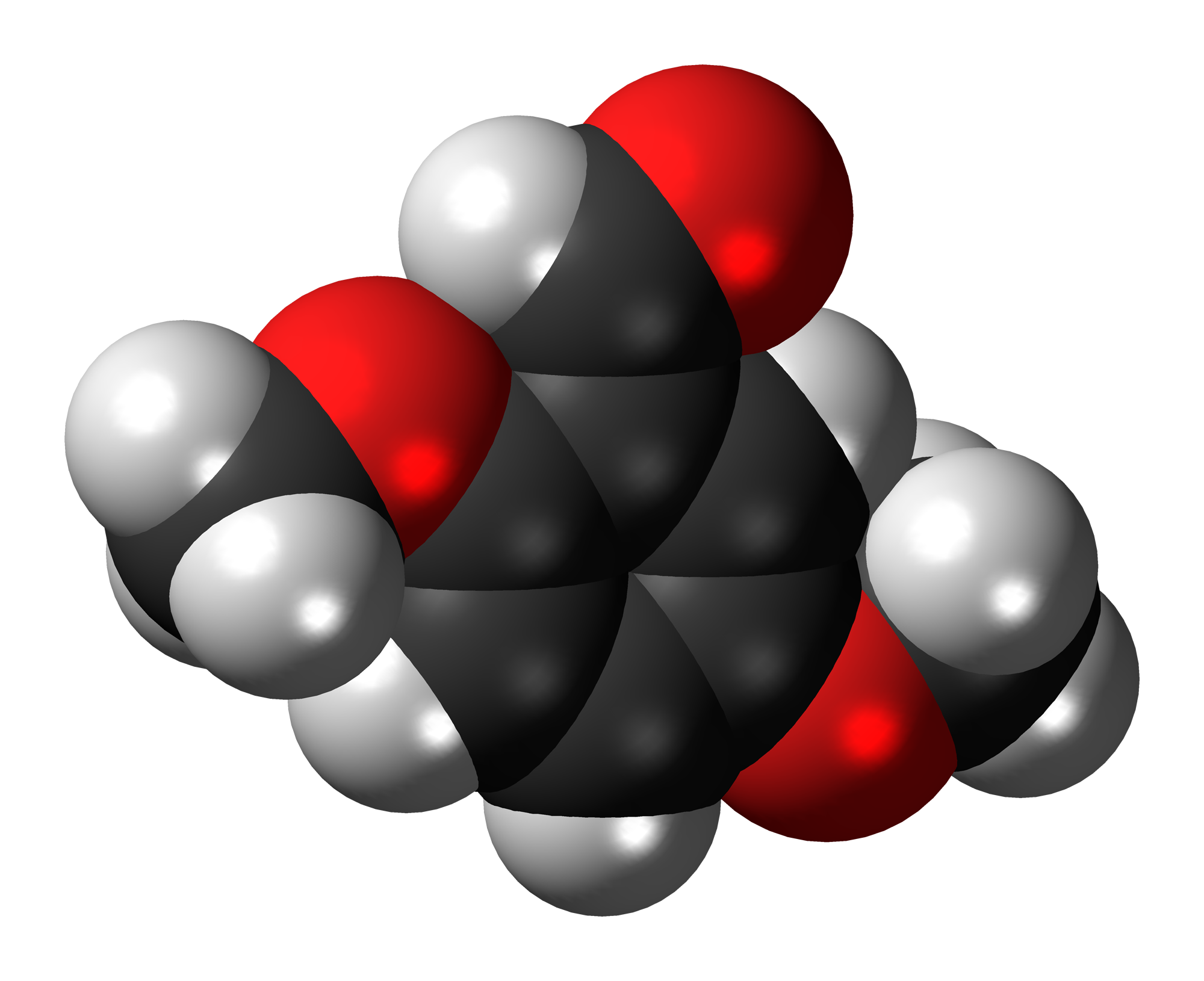

Names
- Preferred IUPAC name 2,5-Dimethoxybenzaldehyde

Identifiers
CAS Number	93-02-7
3D model (JSmol)	Interactive image
ChemSpider	60092
ECHA InfoCard	100.002.011
EC Number	202-211-5
PubChem CID	66726
UNII	W49S1PPL78
CompTox Dashboard (EPA)	DTXSID5052620
- InChI: InChI=1S/C9H10O3/c1-11-8-3-4-9(12-2)7(5-8)6-10/h3-6H,1-2H3 Key: AFUKNJHPZAVHGQ-UHFFFAOYSA-N; InChI=1/C9H10O3/c1-11-8-3-4-9(12-2)7(5-8)6-10/h3-6H,1-2H3 Key: AFUKNJHPZAVHGQ-UHFFFAOYAN
- SMILES: COc1ccc(c(c1)C=O)OC

Properties
Chemical formula	C_{9}H_{10}O_{3}
Molar mass	166.17 g/mol
Appearance	Yellow crystalline solid
Density	1.114 g/mL
Melting point	50 °C (122 °F; 323 K)
Boiling point	283.8 °C (542.8 °F; 557.0 K)

Hazards
- Occupational safety and health (OHS/OSH)
Main hazards	Irritant
- GHS labelling
Pictograms	(GHS07: Exclamation mark) (GHS08: Health hazard)
Signal word	Danger
Hazard statements	H315, H319, H334, H335
Precautionary statements	P261, P264, P271, P280, P285, P302+P352, P304+P340, P304+P341, P305+P351+P338, P312, P332+P313, P337+P313, P342+P311, P362, P403+P233, P405, P501
NFPA 704 (fire diamond)	2 1 0
Flash point	110 °C (230 °F; 383 K) (c.c.)
- Except where otherwise noted, data are given for materials in their standard state (at 25 °C [77 °F], 100 kPa). verify (what is ?) Infobox references

2,5-Dimethoxybenzaldehyde is an organic compound and a benzaldehyde derivative. One of its uses is the production of 2,5-dimethoxyphenethylamine, also known as 2C-H. 2C-H is used to produce many other substituted phenethylamines such as 2C-B, 2C-I and 2C-C.
