= Methylenomycin A =

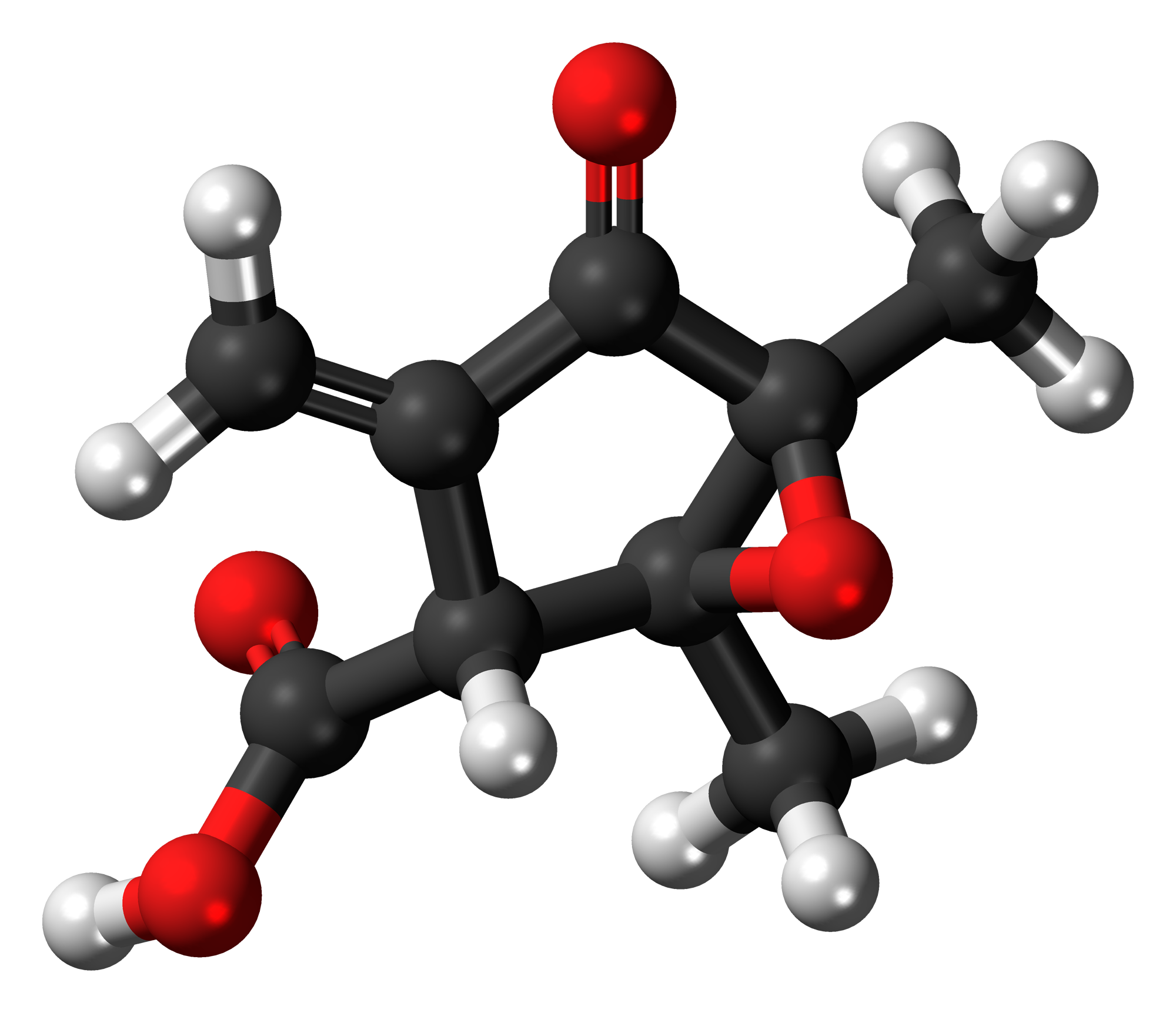

Names
- Preferred IUPAC name (1S,2R,5S)-1,5-Dimethyl-3-methylidene-4-oxo-6-oxabicyclo[3.1.0]hexane-2-carboxylic acid

Identifiers
CAS Number	52775-76-5
3D model (JSmol)	Interactive image
ChemSpider	9074545
PubChem CID	10899285
UNII	X902U0148F
CompTox Dashboard (EPA)	DTXSID40967224
- InChI: InChI=1S/C9H10O4/c1-4-5(7(11)12)8(2)9(3,13-8)6(4)10/h5H,1H2,2-3H3,(H,11,12)/t5-,8-,9+/m0/s1 Key: HBECYYFDLZZMPL-WLGLDCGKSA-N; InChI=1/C9H10O4/c1-4-5(7(11)12)8(2)9(3,13-8)6(4)10/h5H,1H2,2-3H3,(H,11,12)/t5-,8-,9+/m0/s1 Key: HBECYYFDLZZMPL-WLGLDCGKBO
- SMILES: O=C1C(=C)[C@@H](C(=O)O)[C@@]2(O[C@]12C)C

Properties
Chemical formula	C_{9}H_{10}O_{4}
Molar mass	182.175 g·mol^{−1}
Boiling point	341.2 °C (646.2 °F; 614.3 K)

Hazards
Flash point	141.2 °C (286.2 °F; 414.3 K)
- Except where otherwise noted, data are given for materials in their standard state (at 25 °C [77 °F], 100 kPa). verify (what is ?) Infobox references

Methylenomycin A is a cyclopentanone derived antibiotic produced by Streptomyces coelicolor A3(2) that is effective against both Gram-negative and Gram-positive bacteria. The last step of its biosynthesis is epoxidation of the alkene of methylenomycin C.

Biosynthesis of methylenomycin A

== See also ==
- Methylenomycin B
