= Veratraldehyde =

Names
- Preferred IUPAC name 3,4-Dimethoxybenzaldehyde
- Systematic IUPAC name 3,4-Dimethoxybenzenecarbaldehyde
- Other names Methylvanillin; Veratric aldehyde; Veratral; Veratryl aldehyde; Veratrum aldehyde; Vanillin methyl ether

Identifiers
| CAS Number | 120-14-9 |
| 3D model (JSmol) | Interactive image |
| ChEBI | CHEBI:17098 |
| ChEMBL | ChEMBL1088937 |
| ChemSpider | 21106008 |
| ECHA InfoCard | 100.003.976 |
| PubChem CID | 8419 |
| UNII | UI88P68JZD |
| CompTox Dashboard (EPA) | DTXSID7026285 |
- InChI: InChI=1S/C9H10O3/c1-11-8-4-3-7(6-10)5-9(8)12-2/h3-6H,1-2H3 Key: WJUFSDZVCOTFON-UHFFFAOYSA-N; InChI=1S/C9H10O3/c1-11-8-4-3-7(6-10)5-9(8)12-2/h3-6H,1-2H3; InChI=1S/C9H10O3/c1-11-8-4-3-7(6-10)5-9(8)12-2/h3-6H,1-2H3 Key: WJUFSDZVCOTFON-UHFFFAOYSA-N
- SMILES: COc1cc(ccc1OC)C=O

Properties
| Chemical formula | C_{9}H_{10}O_{3} |
| Molar mass | 166.176 g·mol^{−1} |
| Appearance | Peach coloured crystals |
| Density | 1.114 g/mL |
| Melting point | 40 to 43 °C (104 to 109 °F; 313 to 316 K) |
| Boiling point | 281 °C (538 °F; 554 K) |
| Solubility in water | organic solvents |

Hazards
- Occupational safety and health (OHS/OSH)
| Main hazards | Harmful |
- Except where otherwise noted, data are given for materials in their standard state (at 25 °C [77 °F], 100 kPa). verify (what is ?) Infobox references

Veratraldehyde (3,4-dimethoxybenzaldehyde) is an organic compound with the formula (CH_{3}O)_{2}C_{6}H_{3}CHO. Several isomers are known. The compound is widely used as a flavorant and odorant. The compound is structurally related to benzaldehyde, with two methoxy groups.

This compound is popular commercially because of its pleasant woody fragrance. It is derivative of vanillin, from which it is prepared by methylation. It can be obtained by chemical degradation of lignin.

== Uses ==
Veratraldehyde can be used as an intermediate in the synthesis of some pharmaceutical drugs including amiquinsin (actually from 4-aminoveratrole although it appears as if this was made from verataldehyde starting material), benzamidenafil, hoquizil, leniquinsin, piquizil, prazosin, quinazoline, tiapamil, toborinone, verazide, and vetrabutine.

== See also ==
- 3,4,5-Trimethoxybenzaldehyde
