= 2,4-Dimethoxybenzaldehyde =

Chemical compound

Names
- Preferred IUPAC name 2,4-Dimethoxybenzaldehyde

Identifiers
CAS Number	613-45-6
3D model (JSmol)	Interactive image
ChemSpider	62390
ECHA InfoCard	100.009.404
EC Number	210-342-4
PubChem CID	69175
UNII	MM3U32AQ5F
CompTox Dashboard (EPA)	DTXSID3022081
- InChI: InChI=1S/C9H10O3/c1-11-8-4-3-7(6-10)9(5-8)12-2/h3-6H,1-2H3 Key: LWRSYTXEQUUTKW-UHFFFAOYSA-N
- SMILES: O=Cc1ccc(OC)cc1OC

Properties
Chemical formula	C_{9}H_{10}O_{3}
Molar mass	166.176 g·mol^{−1}
Appearance	White solid
Density	1.114 g/mL
Melting point	67 °C (153 °F; 340 K)
Boiling point	307.8 °C (586.0 °F; 581.0 K)
Solubility in water	Insoluble

Hazards
- Occupational safety and health (OHS/OSH)
Main hazards	Irritant
- Except where otherwise noted, data are given for materials in their standard state (at 25 °C [77 °F], 100 kPa). Infobox references

2,4-Dimethoxybenzaldehyde (DMBA) is a reagent used to specifically quantify phlorotannins. This product reacts specifically with 1,3-and 1,3,5-substituted phenols (e.g., phlorotannins) to form a colored product.
