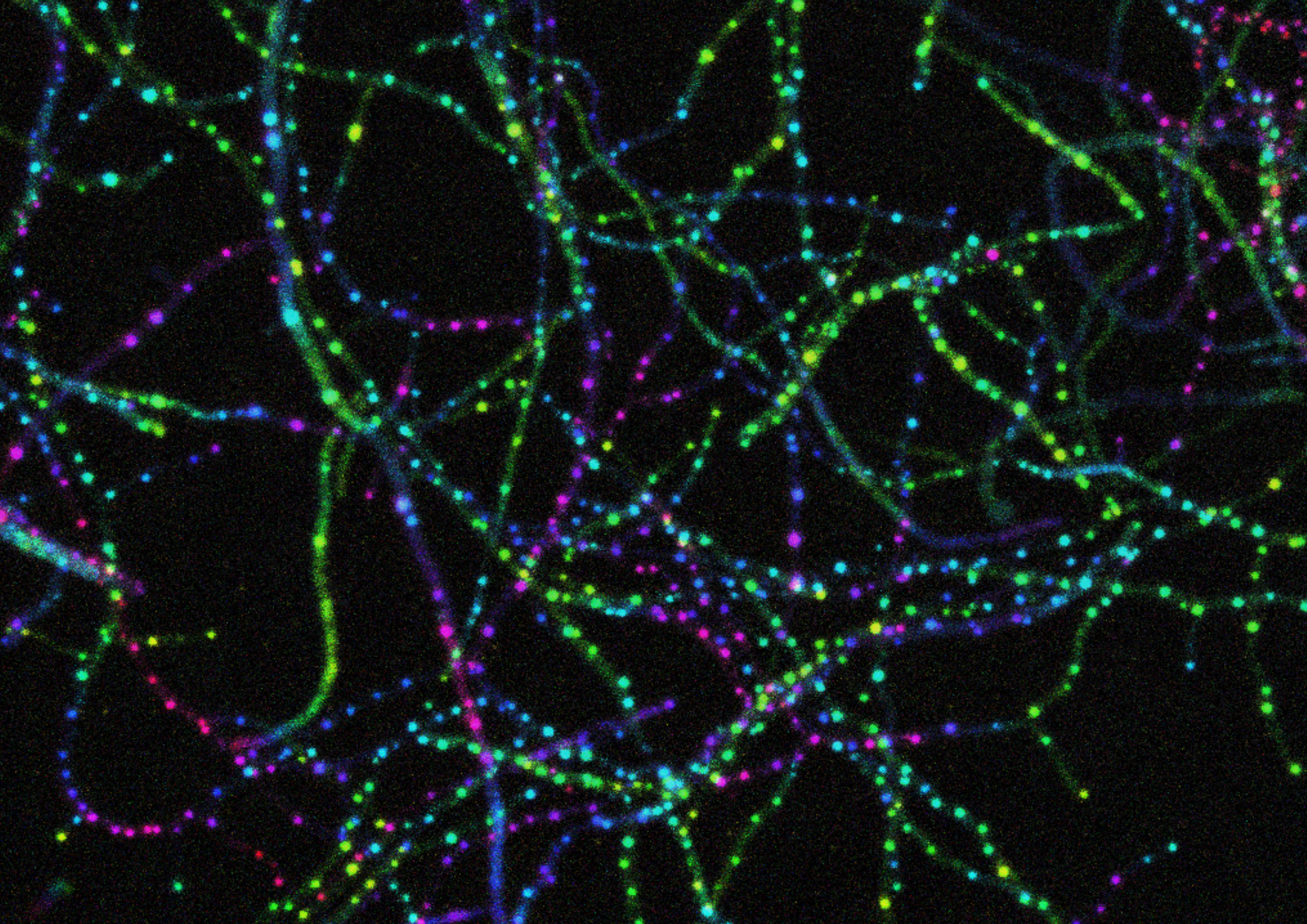

Scientific classification
- Domain: Bacteria
- Kingdom: Bacillati
- Phylum: Actinomycetota
- Class: Actinomycetes
- Order: Streptomycetales
- Family: Streptomycetaceae
- Genus: Streptomyces
- Species: S. albidoflavus

Binomial name
- Streptomyces albidoflavus (Rossi Doria 1891) Waksman and Henrici 1948 (Approved Lists 1980)

Type strain
- AS 4.1291, ATCC 25422, BCRC 13699, CBS 416.34, CBS 920.69, CCRC 13699, CGMCC 4.1291, CIP 105122, DSM 40455, ETH 10209, ICMP 12537, ICSSB 1006, IFO 13010, IMRU 850, IMSNU 20133, IMSNU 21006, ISP 5455, JCM 4446, KCC S-0446, KCC S-0466, KCC S-1072, KCCS-0466, KCTC 9202, Lanoot R-8660, LMG 19300, MTCC 932, NBIMCC 2386, NBRC 13010, NCIB 10043, NCIMB 10043, NRRL B-1271, NRRL B-2663, NRRL B-B-2663, NRRL-ISP 5455, RIA 1202, strain ATCC 25422, VKM Ac-746, VTT E-991429

Synonyms
- "Actinomyces albidoflavus" (Rossi Doria 1891) Gasperini 1894; "Actinomyces globisporus subsp. caucasicus" Kudrina 1957; "Actinomyces sampsonii" Millard and Burr 1926; "Cladothrix albido-flava" [sic] (Rossi Doria 1891) Mace 1901; Streptomyces canescens Waksman 1957 (Approved Lists 1980); Streptomyces champavatii Uma and Narasimha Rao 1959 (Approved Lists 1980); Streptomyces coelicolor (Müller 1908) Waksman and Henrici 1948 (Approved Lists 1980); Streptomyces felleus Lindenbein 1952 (Approved Lists 1980); Streptomyces globisporus subsp. caucasicus (Kudrina 1957) Pridham et al. 1958 (Approved Lists 1980); Streptomyces griseus subsp. solvifaciens Pridham 1970 (Approved Lists 1980); Streptomyces limosus Lindenbein 1952 (Approved Lists 1980); Streptomyces odorifer (Rullmann 1895) Waksman 1953 (Approved Lists 1980); Streptomyces sampsonii (Millard and Burr 1926) Waksman 1953 (Approved Lists 1980); "Streptothrix albidoflava" Rossi Doria 1891; "Streptotrix albidoflava" [sic] Rossi Doria 1891; "Streptothrix coelicolor" Müller 1908

= Streptomyces albidoflavus =

Species of bacterium

Streptomyces albidoflavus is a bacterium species from the genus of Streptomyces which has been isolated from soil from Poland. Streptomyces albidoflavus produces dibutyl phthalate and streptothricins.

== Small noncoding RNA ==
Bacterial small RNAs are involved in post-transcriptional regulation. Using deep sequencing S. albidoflavus transcriptome was analysed at the end of exponential growth. 63 small RNAs were identified. Expression of 11 of them was confirmed by Northern blot. The sRNAs were shown to be only present in Streptomyces species.

sRNA scr4677 (Streptomyces coelicolor sRNA 4677) is located in the intergenic region between anti-sigma factor SCO4677 gene and a putative regulatory protein gene SCO4676. scr4677 expression requires the SCO4677 activity and scr4677 sRNA itself seem to affect the levels of the SCO4676-associated transcripts.

Targets of two of S. albidoflavus noncoding RNAs have been identified. Noncoding RNA of Glutamine Synthetase I was shown to modulate antibiotic production. The small RNA scr5239 (Streptomyces coelicolor sRNA upstream of SCO5239) has two targets. It inhibits agarase DagA expression by direct base pairing to the dagA coding region, and it represses translation of methionine synthase metE (SCO0985) at the 5' end of its open reading frame.

== Fatty acid synthesis ==
A crystal structure is available of the S. albidoflavus [acyl-carrier-protein] S-malonyltransferase. S. albidoflavus's ACP S-MT is involved in both fatty acid synthesis II and polyketide synthase and is structurally similar to Escherichia coli's analogue.

== Usage in biotechnology ==
Strains of S. albidoflavus produce various antibiotics, including actinorhodin, methylenomycin, undecylprodigiosin, and perimycin. Certain strains of S. albidoflavus can be used for heterologous protein expression.

== DNA repair ==
The Ku homolog is SCF55.25c. It contains a Shrimp alkaline phosphatase-like (SAP-like) domain at the C-terminus. S. albidoflavus produces a (putatively) single-domain protein SC9H11.09c which is homologous to the LigD NucDom which is common to many bacterial LigDs. (LigDs are a subfamily of DNA ligases. In bacteria many, but not all LigDs have additional nuclease domains branched from the universally present central ligase domain. If present - as in this case - the nuclease domain is an N-terminus extension.)

== Genetics ==
The genome consists of a single linear molecule, and although Ku would be expected to perform end maintenance, none has been observed so far.

== See also ==
- List of Streptomyces species
