= Cycloisomerase =

Cycloisomerase may refer to:

- 3-carboxy-cis,cis-muconate cycloisomerase (EC 5.5.1.2), an enzyme
- Chloromuconate cycloisomerase (EC 5.5.1.7), an enzyme
- Cycloeucalenol cycloisomerase (EC 5.5.1.9), an enzyme
- Dichloromuconate cycloisomerase (EC 5.5.1.11), an enzyme
- Tetrahydroxypteridine cycloisomerase (EC 5.5.1.3), an enzyme
