= Isomerase =

Class of enzymes which convert a molecule between isomeric forms

In biochemistry, isomerases are a general class of enzymes that convert a molecule from one isomer to another. Isomerases facilitate intramolecular rearrangements in which bonds are broken and formed. The general form of such a reaction is as follows:

$$\ce{A-B} \quad \xrightarrow[\text{ isomerase }]{} \quad \ce{B-A}$$

There is only one substrate yielding one product. This product has the same molecular formula as the substrate but differs in bond connectivity or spatial arrangement. Isomerases catalyze reactions across many biological processes, such as in glycolysis and carbohydrate metabolism.

== Isomerization ==
Examples of isomers

The structural isomers of hexane

Cis-2-butene and Trans-2-butene

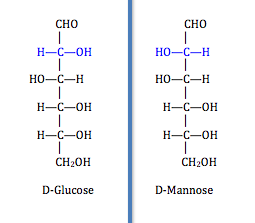
Epimers: D-glucose and D-mannose

Isomerases catalyze changes within one molecule. They convert one isomer to another, meaning that the end product has the same molecular formula but a different physical structure. Isomers themselves exist in many varieties but can generally be classified as structural isomers or stereoisomers. Structural isomers have a different ordering of bonds and/or different bond connectivity from one another, as in the case of hexane and its four other isomeric forms (2-methylpentane, 3-methylpentane, 2,2-dimethylbutane, and 2,3-dimethylbutane).

Stereoisomers have the same ordering of individual bonds and the same connectivity but the three-dimensional arrangement of bonded atoms differ. For example, 2-butene exists in two isomeric forms: cis-2-butene and trans-2-butene. The sub-categories of isomerases containing racemases, epimerases and cis-trans isomers are examples of enzymes catalyzing the interconversion of stereoisomers. Intramolecular lyases, oxidoreductases and transferases catalyze the interconversion of structural isomers.

The prevalence of each isomer in nature depends in part on the isomerization energy, the difference in energy between isomers. Isomers close in energy can interconvert easily and are often seen in comparable proportions. The isomerization energy, for example, for converting from a stable cis isomer to the less stable trans isomer is greater than for the reverse reaction, explaining why in the absence of isomerases or an outside energy source such as ultraviolet radiation a given cis isomer tends to be present in greater amounts than the trans isomer. Isomerases can increase the reaction rate by lowering the isomerization energy.

Calculating isomerase kinetics from experimental data can be more difficult than for other enzymes because the use of product inhibition experiments is impractical. That is, isomerization is not an irreversible reaction since a reaction vessel will contain one substrate and one product so the typical simplified model for calculating reaction kinetics does not hold. There are also practical difficulties in determining the rate-determining step at high concentrations in a single isomerization. Instead, tracer perturbation can overcome these technical difficulties if there are two forms of the unbound enzyme. This technique uses isotope exchange to measure indirectly the interconversion of the free enzyme between its two forms. The radiolabeled substrate and product diffuse in a time-dependent manner. When the system reaches equilibrium the addition of unlabeled substrate perturbs or unbalances it. As equilibrium is established again, the radiolabeled substrate and product are tracked to determine energetic information.

The earliest use of this technique elucidated the kinetics and mechanism underlying the action of phosphoglucomutase, favoring the model of indirect transfer of phosphate with one intermediate and the direct transfer of glucose. This technique was then adopted to study the profile of proline racemase and its two states: the form which isomerizes L-proline and the other for D-proline. At high concentrations it was shown that the transition state in this interconversion is rate-limiting and that these enzyme forms may differ just in the protonation at the acidic and basic groups of the active site.

== Nomenclature ==
Generally, "the names of isomerases are formed as "substrate isomerase" (for example, enoyl CoA isomerase), or as "substrate type of isomerase" (for example, phosphoglucomutase)."

== Classification ==
Enzyme-catalyzed reactions each have a uniquely assigned classification number. Isomerase-catalyzed reactions have their own EC category: EC 5. Isomerases are further classified into six subclasses:

=== Racemases, epimerases ===
This category (EC 5.1) includes (racemases) and epimerases). These isomerases invert stereochemistry at the target chiral carbon. Racemases act upon molecules with one chiral carbon for inversion of stereochemistry, whereas epimerases target molecules with multiple chiral carbons and act upon one of them. A molecule with only one chiral carbon has two enantiomeric forms, such as serine having the isoforms D-serine and L-serine differing only in the absolute configuration about the chiral carbon. A molecule with multiple chiral carbons has two forms at each chiral carbon. Isomerization at one chiral carbon of several yields epimers, which differ from one another in absolute configuration at just one chiral carbon. For example, D-glucose and D-mannose differ in configuration at just one chiral carbon. This class is further broken down by the group the enzyme acts upon:

Racemases and epimerases:
EC number	Description	Examples
EC 5.1.1	Acting on Amino Acids and Derivative	alanine racemase, methionine racemase
EC 5.1.2	Acting on Hydroxy Acids and Derivatives	lactate racemase, tartrate epimerase
EC 5.1.3	Acting on Carbohydrates and Derivatives	ribulose-phosphate 3-epimerase, UDP-glucose 4-epimerase
EC 5.1.99	Acting on Other Compounds	methylmalonyl CoA epimerase, hydantoin racemase

=== Cis-trans isomerases ===
This category (EC 5.2) includes enzymes that catalyze the isomerization of cis-trans isomers. Alkenes and cycloalkanes may have cis-trans stereoisomers. These isomers are not distinguished by absolute configuration but rather by the position of substituent groups relative to a plane of reference, as across a double bond or relative to a ring structure. Cis isomers have substituent groups on the same side and trans isomers have groups on opposite sides.

This category is not broken down any further. All entries presently include:

Conversion mediated by peptidylprolyl isomerase (PPIase).

Cis-trans isomerases:
EC number	Examples
EC 5.2.1.1	Maleate isomerase
EC 5.2.1.2	Maleylacetoacetate isomerase
EC 5.2.1.4	Maleylpyruvate isomerase
EC 5.2.1.5	Linoleate isomerase
EC 5.2.1.6	Furylfuramide isomerase
EC 5.2.1.8	Peptidylprolyl isomerase
EC 5.2.1.9	Farnesol 2-isomerase
EC 5.2.1.10	2-chloro-4-carboxymethylenebut-2-en-1,4-olide isomerase
EC 5.2.1.12	Zeta-carotene isomerase
EC 5.2.1.13	Prolycopene isomerase
EC 5.2.1.14	Beta-carotene isomerase

=== Intramolecular oxidoreductases ===
This category (EC 5.3) includes intramolecular oxidoreductases. These isomerases catalyze the transfer of electrons from one part of the molecule to another. In other words, they catalyze the oxidation of one part of the molecule and the concurrent reduction of another part. Sub-categories of this class are:

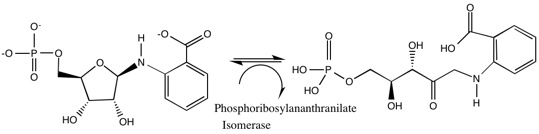
reaction catalyzed by phosphoribosylanthranilate isomerase

Intramolecular oxidoreductases:
EC number	Description	Examples
EC 5.3.1	Interconverting Aldoses and Ketoses	Triose-phosphate isomerase, Ribose-5-phosphate isomerase
EC 5.3.2	Interconverting Keto- and Enol-Groups	Phenylpyruvate tautomerase, Oxaloacetate tautomerase
EC 5.3.3	Transposing C=C Double Bonds	Steroid Delta-isomerase, L-dopachrome isomerase
EC 5.3.4	Transposing S-S Bonds	Protein disulfide-isomerase
EC 5.3.99	Other Intramolecular Oxidoreductases	Prostaglandin-D synthase, Allene-oxide cyclase

=== Intramolecular transferases ===
This category (EC 5.4) includes intramolecular transferases (mutases). These isomerases catalyze the transfer of functional groups from one part of a molecule to another. Phosphotransferases (EC 5.4.2) were categorized as transferases (EC 2.7.5) with regeneration of donors until 1983. This sub-class can be broken down according to the functional group the enzyme transfers:

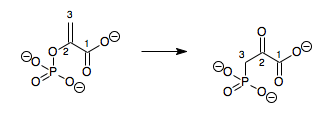
reaction catalyzed by phosphoenolpyruvate mutase

Intramolecular transferases:
EC number	Description	Examples
EC 5.4.1	Transferring Acyl Groups	Lysolecithin acylmutase, Precorrin-8X methylmutase
EC 5.4.2	Phosphotransferases (Phosphomutases)	Phosphoglucomutase, Phosphopentomutase
EC 5.4.3	Transferring Amino Groups	Beta-lysine 5,6-aminomutase, Tyrosine 2,3-aminomutase
EC 5.4.4	Transferring hydroxy groups	(hydroxyamino)benzene mutase, Isochorismate synthase
EC 5.4.99	Transferring Other Groups	Methylaspartate mutase, Chorismate mutase

=== Intramolecular lyases ===
This category (EC 5.5) includes intramolecular lyases. These enzymes catalyze "reactions in which a group can be regarded as eliminated from one part of a molecule, leaving a double bond, while remaining covalently attached to the molecule." Some of these catalyzed reactions involve the breaking of a ring structure.

This category is not broken down any further. All entries presently include:

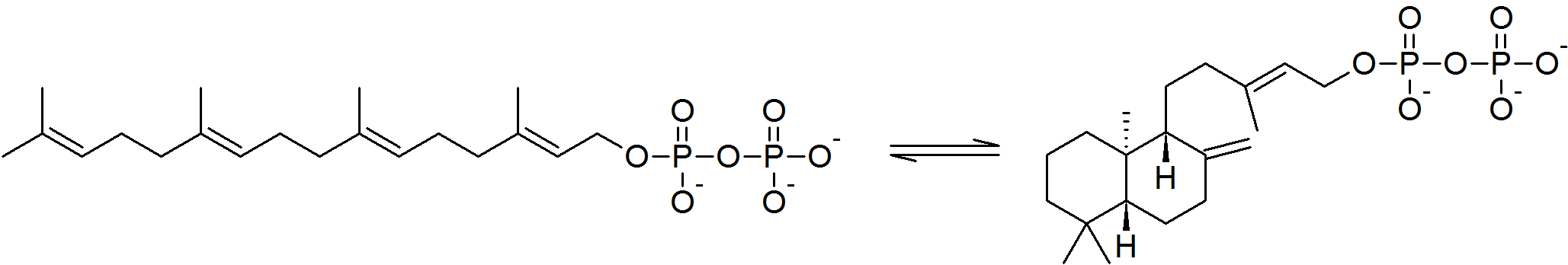
reaction catalyzed by ent-Copalyl diphosphate synthase

Intramolecular lyases:
EC number	Examples
EC 5.5.1.1	Muconate cycloisomerase
EC 5.5.1.2	3-carboxy-cis,cis-muconate cycloisomerase
EC 5.5.1.3	Tetrahydroxypteridine cycloisomerase
EC 5.5.1.4	Inositol-3-phosphate synthase
EC 5.5.1.5	Carboxy-cis,cis-muconate cyclase
EC 5.5.1.6	Chalcone isomerase
EC 5.5.1.7	Chloromuconate cycloisomerase
EC 5.5.1.8	(+)-bornyl diphosphate synthase
EC 5.5.1.9	Cycloeucalenol cycloisomerase
EC 5.5.1.10	Alpha-pinene-oxide decyclase
EC 5.5.1.11	Dichloromuconate cycloisomerase
EC 5.5.1.12	Copalyl diphosphate synthase
EC 5.5.1.13	Ent-copalyl diphosphate synthase
EC 5.5.1.14	Syn-copalyl-diphosphate synthase
EC 5.5.1.15	Terpentedienyl-diphosphate synthase
EC 5.5.1.16	Halimadienyl-diphosphate synthase
EC 5.5.1.17	(S)-beta-macrocarpene synthase
EC 5.5.1.18	Lycopene epsilon-cyclase
EC 5.5.1.19	Lycopene beta-cyclase
EC 5.5.1.20	Prosolanapyrone-III cycloisomerase
EC 5.5.1.n1	D-ribose pyranase

== Mechanisms of isomerases ==
=== Ring expansion and contraction via tautomers ===
The isomerization of glucose-6-phosphate by glucose-6-phosphate isomerase

A classic example of ring opening and contraction is the isomerization of glucose (an aldehyde with a six-membered ring) to fructose (a ketone with a five-membered ring). The conversion of D-glucose-6-phosphate to D-fructose-6-phosphate is catalyzed by glucose-6-phosphate isomerase, an intramolecular oxidoreductase. The overall reaction involves the opening of the ring to form an aldose via acid/base catalysis and the subsequent formation of a cis-endiol intermediate. A ketose is then formed and the ring is closed again.

Glucose-6-phosphate first binds to the active site of the isomerase. The isomerase opens the ring: its His388 residue protonates the oxygen on the glucose ring (and thereby breaking the O5-C1 bond) in conjunction with Lys518 deprotonating the C1 hydroxyl oxygen. The ring opens to form a straight-chain aldose with an acidic C2 proton. The C3-C4 bond rotates and Glu357 (assisted by His388) depronates C2 to form a double bond between C1 and C2. A cis-endiol intermediate is created and the C1 oxygen is protonated by the catalytic residue, accompanied by the deprotonation of the endiol C2 oxygen. The straight-chain ketose is formed. To close the fructose ring, the reverse of ring opening occurs and the ketose is protonated.

=== Epimerization ===
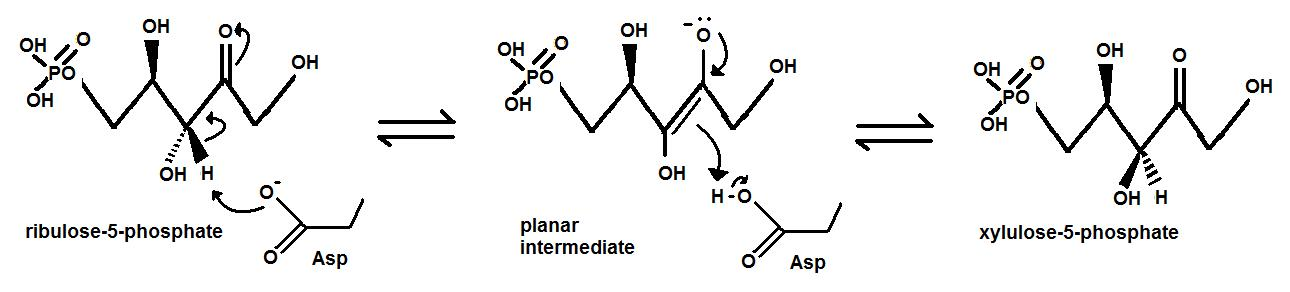
The conversion of ribulose-5-phosphate to xylulose-5-phosphate

An example of epimerization is found in the Calvin cycle when D-ribulose-5-phosphate is converted into D-xylulose-5-phosphate by ribulose-phosphate 3-epimerase. The substrate and product differ only in stereochemistry at the third carbon in the chain. The underlying mechanism involves the deprotonation of that third carbon to form a reactive enolate intermediate. The enzyme's active site contains two Asp residues. After the substrate binds to the enzyme, the first Asp deprotonates the third carbon from one side of the molecule. This leaves a planar sp^{2}-hybridized intermediate. The second Asp is located on the opposite side of the active side and it protonates the molecule, effectively adding a proton from the back side. These coupled steps invert stereochemistry at the third carbon.

=== Intramolecular transfer ===
A proposed mechanism for chorismate mutase. Clark, T., Stewart, J.D. and Ganem, B. Transition-state analogue inhibitors of chlorismate mutase. Tetrahedron 46 (1990) 731–748. © IUBMB 2001

Chorismate mutase is an intramolecular transferase and it catalyzes the conversion of chorismate to prephenate, used as a precursor for L-tyrosine and L-phenylalanine in some plants and bacteria. This reaction is a Claisen rearrangement that can proceed with or without the isomerase, though the rate increases 10^{6} fold in the presence of chorismate mutase. The reaction goes through a chair transition state with the substrate in a trans-diaxial position. Experimental evidence indicates that the isomerase selectively binds the chair transition state, though the exact mechanism of catalysis is not known. It is thought that this binding stabilizes the transition state through electrostatic effects, accounting for the dramatic increase in the reaction rate in the presence of the mutase or upon addition of a specifically-placed cation in the active site.

=== Intramolecular oxidoreduction ===
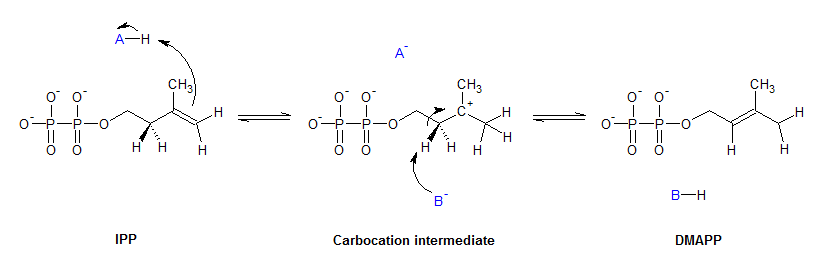
Conversion by IPP isomerase

Isopentenyl-diphosphate delta isomerase type I (also known as IPP isomerase) is seen in cholesterol synthesis and in particular it catalyzes the conversion of isopentenyl diphosphate (IPP) to dimethylallyl diphosphate (DMAPP). In this isomerization reaction a stable carbon-carbon double bond is rearranged top create a highly electrophilic allylic isomer. IPP isomerase catalyzes this reaction by the stereoselective antarafacial transposition of a single proton. The double bond is protonated at C4 to form a tertiary carbocation intermediate at C3. The adjacent carbon, C2, is deprotonated from the opposite face to yield a double bond. In effect, the double bond is shifted over.

== The role of isomerase in human disease ==
Isomerase plays a role in human disease. Deficiencies of this enzyme can cause disorders in humans.

=== Phosphohexose isomerase deficiency ===
Phosphohexose Isomerase Deficiency (PHI) is also known as phosphoglucose isomerase deficiency or Glucose-6-phosphate isomerase deficiency, and is a hereditary enzyme deficiency. PHI is the second most frequent erthoenzyopathy in glycolysis besides pyruvate kinase deficiency, and is associated with non-spherocytic haemolytic anaemia of variable severity. This disease is centered on the glucose-6-phosphate protein. This protein can be found in the secretion of some cancer cells. PHI is the result of a dimeric enzyme that catalyses the reversible interconversion of fructose-6-phosphate and gluose-6-phosphate.

PHI is a very rare disease with only 50 cases reported in literature to date.

Diagnosis is made on the basis of the clinical picture in association with biochemical studies revealing erythrocyte GPI deficiency (between 7 and 60% of normal) and identification of a mutation in the GPI gene by molecular analysis.

The deficiency of phosphohexose isomerase can lead to a condition referred to as hemolytic syndrome. As in humans, the hemolytic syndrome, which is characterized by a diminished erythrocyte number, lower hematocrit, lower hemoglobin, higher number of reticulocytes and plasma bilirubin concentration, as well as increased liver- and spleen-somatic indices, was exclusively manifested in homozygous mutants.

=== Triosephosphate isomerase deficiency ===
The disease referred to as triosephosphate isomerase deficiency (TPI), is a severe autosomal recessive inherited multisystem disorder of glycolytic metabolism. It is characterized by hemolytic anemia and neurodegeneration, and is caused by anaerobic metabolic dysfunction. This dysfunction results from a missense mutation that effects the encoded TPI protein. The most common mutation is the substitution of gene, Glu104Asp, which produces the most severe phenotype, and is responsible for approximately 80% of clinical TPI deficiency.

TPI deficiency is very rare with less than 50 cases reported in literature. Being an autosomal recessive inherited disease, TPI deficiency has a 25% recurrence risk in the case of heterozygous parents. It is a congenital disease that most often occurs with hemolytic anemia and manifests with jaundice. Most patients with TPI for Glu104Asp mutation or heterozygous for a TPI null allele and Glu104Asp have a life expectancy of infancy to early childhood. TPI patients with other mutations generally show longer life expectancy. There are only two cases of individuals with TPI living beyond the age of 6. These cases involve two brothers from Hungary, one who did not develop neurological symptoms until the age of 12, and the older brother who has no neurological symptoms and suffers from anemia only.

Individuals with TPI show obvious symptoms after 6–24 months of age. These symptoms include: dystonia, tremor, dyskinesia, pyramidal tract signs, cardiomyopathy and spinal motor neuron involvement. Patients also show frequent respiratory system bacterial infections.

TPI is detected through deficiency of enzymatic activity and the build-up of dihyroxyacetone phosphate(DHAP), which is a toxic substrate, in erythrocytes. This can be detected through physical examination and a series of lab work. In detection, there is generally myopathic changes seen in muscles and chronic axonal neuropathy found in the nerves. Diagnosis of TPI can be confirmed through molecular genetics. Chorionic villus DNA analysis or analysis of fetal red cells can be used to detect TPI in antenatal diagnosis.

Treatment for TPI is not specific, but varies according to different cases. Because of the range of symptoms TPI causes, a team of specialist may be needed to provide treatment to a single individual. That team of specialists would consists of pediatricians, cardiologists, neurologists, and other healthcare professionals, that can develop a comprehensive plan of action.

Supportive measures such as red cell transfusions in cases of severe anaemia can be taken to treat TPI as well. In some cases, spleen removal (splenectomy) may improve the anaemia. There is no treatment to prevent progressive neurological impairment of any other non-haematological clinical manifestation of the diseases.

== Industrial applications ==
By far the most common use of isomerases in industrial applications is in sugar manufacturing. Glucose isomerase (also known as xylose isomerase) catalyzes the conversion of D-xylose and D-glucose to D-xylulose and D-fructose. Like most sugar isomerases, glucose isomerase catalyzes the interconversion of aldoses and ketoses.

The conversion of glucose to fructose is a key component of high-fructose corn syrup production. Isomerization is more specific than older chemical methods of fructose production, resulting in a higher yield of fructose and no side products. The fructose produced from this isomerization reaction is purer with no residual flavors from contaminants. High-fructose corn syrup is preferred by many confectionery and soda manufacturers because of the high sweetening power of fructose (twice that of sucrose), its relatively low cost and its inability to crystallize. Fructose is also used as a sweetener for use by diabetics. Major issues of the use of glucose isomerase involve its inactivation at higher temperatures and the requirement for a high pH (between 7.0 and 9.0) in the reaction environment. Moderately high temperatures, above 70 °C, increase the yield of fructose by at least half in the isomerization step. The enzyme requires a divalent cation such as Co^{2+} and Mg^{2+} for peak activity, an additional cost to manufacturers. Glucose isomerase also has a much higher affinity for xylose than for glucose, necessitating a carefully controlled environment.

The isomerization of xylose to xylulose has its own commercial applications as interest in biofuels has increased. This reaction is often seen naturally in bacteria that feed on decaying plant matter. Its most common industrial use is in the production of ethanol, achieved by the fermentation of xylulose. The use of hemicellulose as source material is very common. Hemicellulose contains xylan, which itself is composed of xylose in β(1,4) linkages. The use of glucose isomerase very efficiently converts xylose to xylulose, which can then be acted upon by fermenting yeast. Overall, extensive research in genetic engineering has been invested into optimizing glucose isomerase and facilitating its recovery from industrial applications for re-use.

Glucose isomerase is able to catalyze the isomerization of a range of other sugars, including D-ribose, D-allose and L-arabinose. The most efficient substrates are those similar to glucose and xylose, having equatorial hydroxyl groups at the third and fourth carbons. The current model for the mechanism of glucose isomerase is that of a hydride shift based on X-ray crystallography and isotope exchange studies.

== Membrane-associated isomerases ==
Some isomerases associate with biological membranes as peripheral membrane proteins or anchored through a single transmembrane helix, for example isomerases with the thioredoxin domain, and certain prolyl isomerases.
