= Sol5 =

Sol5 may refer to:

- Prosolanapyrone-II oxidase, an enzyme
- Prosolanapyrone-III cycloisomerase, an enzyme
