= Steviol =

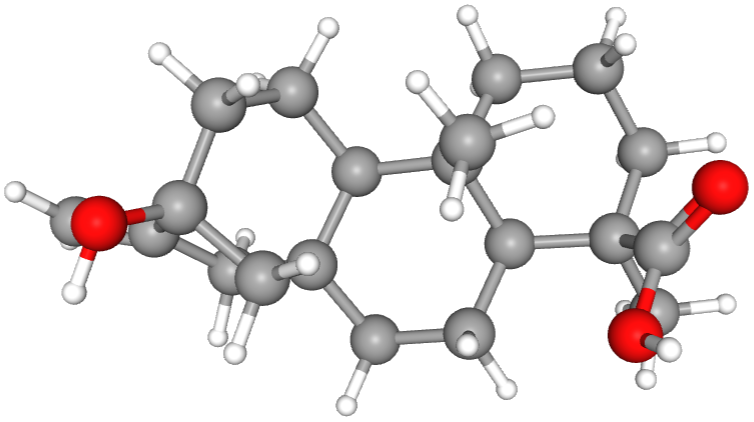

Names
- IUPAC name 13-Hydroxy-5β,8α,9β,10α,13α-kaur-16-en-18-oic acid
- Systematic IUPAC name (4R,4aS,6aR,9S,11aR,11bS)-9-Hydroxy-4,11b-dimethyl-8-methylidenetetradecahydro-6a,9-methanocyclohepta[a]naphthalene-4-carboxylic acid
- Other names Hydroxydehydrostevic acid 13-Hydroxykaurenoic acid ent-13-Hydroxykaur-16-en-19-oic acid

Identifiers
CAS Number	471-80-7
3D model (JSmol)	Interactive image
ChEBI	CHEBI:145024
ChEMBL	ChEMBL444122
ChemSpider	398979
PubChem CID	452967
UNII	4741LYX6RT
CompTox Dashboard (EPA)	DTXSID50897427
- InChI: InChI=1S/C20H30O3/c1-13-11-19-9-5-14-17(2,7-4-8-18(14,3)16(21)22)15(19)6-10-20(13,23)12-19/h14-15,23H,1,4-12H2,2-3H3,(H,21,22)/t14-,15-,17+,18+,19+,20-/m0/s1 Key: QFVOYBUQQBFCRH-VQSWZGCSSA-N; InChI=1/C20H30O3/c1-13-11-19-9-5-14-17(2,7-4-8-18(14,3)16(21)22)15(19)6-10-20(13,23)12-19/h14-15,23H,1,4-12H2,2-3H3,(H,21,22)/t14-,15-,17+,18+,19+,20-/m0/s1 Key: QFVOYBUQQBFCRH-VQSWZGCSBR
- SMILES: O=C(O)[C@]4([C@H]3CC[C@@]21C[C@](O)(\C(=C)C1)CC[C@H]2[C@]3(C)CCC4)C

Properties
Chemical formula	C_{20}H_{30}O_{3}
Molar mass	318.457 g·mol^{−1}
- Except where otherwise noted, data are given for materials in their standard state (at 25 °C [77 °F], 100 kPa). verify (what is ?) Infobox references

Steviol is a diterpene first isolated from the plant Stevia rebaudiana in 1931. Its chemical structure was not fully elucidated until 1960.

Steviol occurs in the plant as steviol glycosides, sweet compounds that have found widespread use as sugar substitutes. The aglycon is prepared by enzymatic hydrolysis, since upon acid treatment steviol will undergo Wagner-Meerwein rearrangement to the very stable isosteviol.

== Biosynthesis ==
In Stevia rebaudiana, the biosynthesis of steviol is confined to green tissues. The precursors of steviol are synthesized via the non-mevalonate pathway located in plant cell plastids, which produces isopentenyl pyrophosphate (IPP) and dimethylallyl pyrophosphate (DMAPP). IPP and DMAPP are converted to geranylgeranyl diphosphate (GGDP), which is the precursor of many diterpenoids, by GGDP synthase. GPDP is made into a cyclic compound, copalyl diphosphate (CDP), by CDP synthase, after which kaurene is produced by another cyclization catalyzed by kaurene synthase.

The kaurene is then transferred to the endoplasmic reticulum, where it is oxidized to kaurenoic acid by kaurene oxidase in a reaction that uses up oxygen and NADPH. Then steviol is produced by hydroxylation. The steviol is subsequently glycosylated in the cytoplasm.

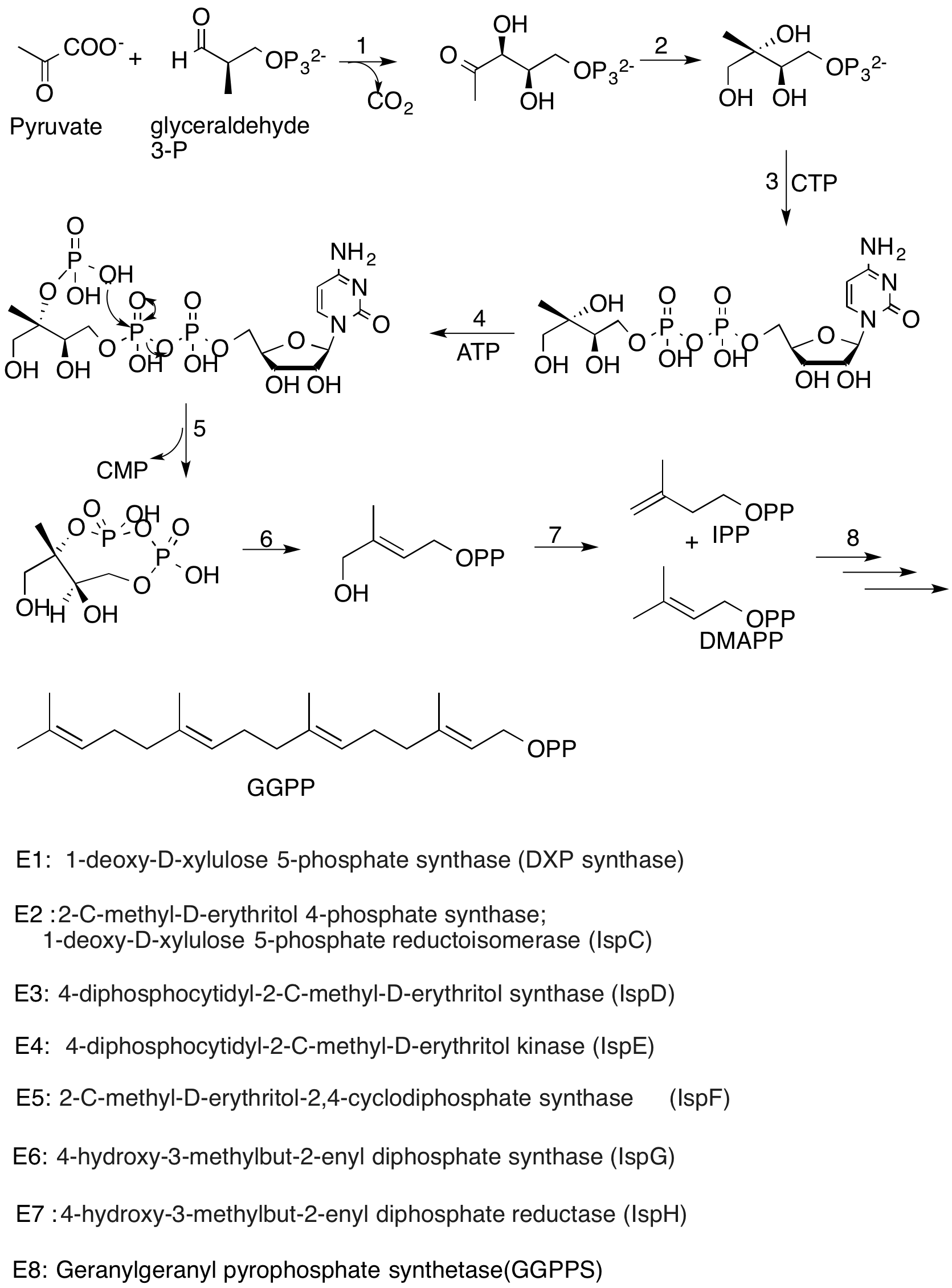
Biosynthesis of steviol
