= Gibberellin =

Class of plant hormones

Gibberellins (GAs) are plant hormones that regulate various developmental processes, including stem elongation, germination, dormancy, flowering, flower development, and leaf and fruit senescence. They are one of the longest-known classes of plant hormone. It is thought that the selective breeding (albeit unconscious) of crop strains that were deficient in GA synthesis was one of the key drivers of the "green revolution" in the 1960s, a revolution that is credited to have saved over a billion lives all over the world.

== Chemistry ==
All known gibberellins are diterpenoid acids synthesized by the terpenoid pathway in plastids and then modified in the endoplasmic reticulum and cytosol until they reach their biologically active form. All are derived via the ent-gibberellane skeleton but are synthesised via ent-kaurene. The gibberellins are named GA_{1} through GA_{n} in order of discovery. Gibberellic acid, which was the first gibberellin to be structurally characterized, is GA_{3}.

As of 2020, there are 136 GAs identified from plants, fungi, and bacteria.

Gibberellins are tetracyclic diterpene acids. There are two classes, with either 19 or 20 carbons. The 19-carbon gibberellins are generally the biologically active forms. They have lost carbon 20 and, in place, possess a five-member lactone bridge that links carbons 4 and 10. Hydroxylation also has a great effect on its biological activity. In general, the most biologically active compounds are dihydroxylated gibberellins, with hydroxyl groups on both carbons 3 and 13. Gibberellic acid is a 19-carbon dihydroxylated gibberellin.

=== Bioactive GAs ===
The bioactive Gibberellins are GA_{1}, GA_{3}, GA_{4}, and GA_{7}. There are three common structural traits between these GAs: 1) hydroxyl group on C-3β, 2) a carboxyl group on carbon 6, and 3) a lactone between carbons 4 and 10.

Gibberellin A_{1} (GA_{1})

Gibberellic acid (GA_{3})

ent-Gibberellane

ent-Kaurene

The 3β-hydroxyl group can be exchanged for other functional groups at C-2 and/or C-3 positions. GA_{5} and GA_{6} are examples of bioactive GAs without a hydroxyl group on C-3β. The presence of GA_{1} in various plant species suggests that it is a common bioactive GA.

== Biological function ==
1. Shows a plant lacking gibberellins, and which and has an internode length of "0" as well as being a dwarf plant. 2. Shows an average plant with a moderate amount of gibberellins, and an average internode length. 3. Shows a plant with a large amount of gibberellins and so has a much longer internode length, because gibberellins promote cell division in the stem.

Gibberellins are involved in the natural process of breaking dormancy and other aspects of germination. Before the photosynthetic apparatus develops sufficiently in the early stages of germination, the seed reserves of starch nourish the seedling. Usually in germination, the breakdown of starch to glucose in the endosperm begins shortly after the seed is exposed to water. Gibberellins in the seed embryo are believed to signal starch hydrolysis through inducing the synthesis of the enzyme α-amylase in the aleurone cells. In the model for gibberellin-induced production of α-amylase, it is demonstrated that gibberellins from the scutellum diffuse to the aleurone cells, where they stimulate the secretion α-amylase. α-Amylase then hydrolyses starch (abundant in many seeds), into glucose that can be used to produce energy for the seed embryo. Studies of this process have indicated gibberellins cause higher levels of transcription of the gene coding for the α-amylase enzyme, to stimulate the synthesis of α-amylase.

Exposition to cold temperatures increases the production of Gibberellins. They stimulate cell elongation, breaking and budding, and seedless fruits. Gibberellins cause also seed germination by breaking the seed's dormancy and acting as a chemical messenger. Its hormone binds to a receptor, and calcium activates the protein calmodulin, and the complex binds to DNA, producing an enzyme to stimulate growth in the embryo.

== Metabolism ==
=== Biosynthesis ===
Gibberellins are usually synthesized from the methylerythritol phosphate (MEP) pathway in higher plants. In this pathway, bioactive GA is produced from trans-geranylgeranyl diphosphate (GGDP), with the participation of three classes of enzymes: terpene syntheses (TPSs), cytochrome P450 monooxygenases (P450s), and 2-oxoglutarate–dependent dioxygenases (2ODDs). The MEP pathway follows eight steps:

1. GGDP is converted to ent-copalyl diphosphate (ent-CDP) by ent-copalyl diphosphate synthase (CPS)
2. ent-CDP is converted to ent-kaurene by ent-kaurene synthase (KS)
3. ent-kaurene is converted to ent-kaurenol by ent-kaurene oxidase (KO)
4. ent-kaurenol is converted to ent-kaurenal by KO
5. ent-kaurenal is converted to ent-kaurenoic acid by KO
6. ent-kaurenoic acid is converted to ent-7a-hydroxykaurenoic acid by ent-kaurenoic acid oxidase (KAO)
7. ent-7a-hydroxykaurenoic acid is converted to GA12-aldehyde by KAO
8. GA12-aldehyde is converted to GA12 by KAO. GA12 is processed to the bioactive GA4 by oxidations on C-20 and C-3, which is accomplished by 2 soluble ODDs: GA 20-oxidase and GA 3-oxidase.

One or two genes encode the enzymes responsible for the first steps of GA biosynthesis in Arabidopsis and rice. The null alleles of the genes encoding CPS, KS, and KO result in GA-deficient Arabidopsis dwarves. Multigene families encode the 2ODDs that catalyze the formation of GA_{12} to bioactive GA_{4}.

AtGA3ox1 and AtGA3ox2, two of the four genes that encode GA3ox in Arabidopsis, affect vegetative development. Environmental stimuli regulate AtGA3ox1 and AtGA3ox2 activity during seed germination. In Arabidopsis, GA20ox overexpression leads to an increase in GA concentration.

==== Sites of biosynthesis ====
Most bioactive Gibberellins are located in actively growing organs on plants. Both GA20ox and GA3ox genes (genes coding for GA 20-oxidase and GA 3-oxidase) and the SLENDER1 gene (a GA signal transduction gene) are found in growing organs on rice, which suggests bioactive GA synthesis occurs at their site of action in growing organs in plants. During flower development, the tapetum of anthers is believed to be a primary site of GA biosynthesis.

==== Differences between biosynthesis in fungi and lower plants ====
The flower Arabidopsis and the fungus Gibberella fujikuroi possess different GA pathways and enzymes. P450s in fungi perform functions analogous to the functions of KAOs in plants. The function of CPS and KS in plants is performed by a single enzyme in fungi (CPS/KS). In plants the Gibberellin biosynthesis genes are found randomly on multiple chromosomes, but in fungi are found on one chromosome .

Plants produce low amount of Gibberellic Acid, therefore is produced for industrial purposes by microorganisms. Industrially GA_{3} can be produced by submerged fermentation, but this process presents low yield with high production costs and hence higher sale value, nevertheless other alternative process to reduce costs of its production is solid-state fermentation (SSF) that allows the use of agro-industrial residues.

=== Catabolism ===
Several mechanisms for inactivating Giberellins have been identified. 2β-hydroxylation deactivates them, and is catalyzed by GA2-oxidases (GA2oxs). Some GA2oxs use 19-carbon Gibberellins as substrates, while other use C20-GAs. Cytochrome P450 mono-oxygenase, encoded by elongated uppermost internode (eui), converts Gibberellins into 16α,17-epoxides. Rice eui mutants amass bioactive Gibberellins at high levels, which suggests cytochrome P450 mono-oxygenase is a main enzyme responsible for deactivation GA in rice. The Gamt1 and gamt2 genes encode enzymes that methylate the C-6 carboxyl group of GAs. In a gamt1 and gamt2 mutant, concentrations of GA in developing seeds is increased.

=== Homeostasis ===
Feedback and feedforward regulation maintains the levels of bioactive Gibberellins in plants. Levels of AtGA20ox1 and AtGA3ox1 expression are increased in a Gibberellin deficient environment, and decreased after the addition of bioactive GAs, Conversely, expression of the Gibberellin deactivation genes AtGA2ox1 and AtGA2ox2 is increased with addition of Gibberellins.

== Regulation ==
=== Regulation by other hormones ===
The auxin indole-3-acetic acid (IAA) regulates concentration of GA_{1} in elongating internodes in peas. Removal of IAA by removal of the apical bud, the auxin source, reduces the concentration of GA_{1}, and reintroduction of IAA reverses these effects to increase the concentration of GA_{1}. This has also been observed in tobacco plants. Auxin increases GA 3-oxidation and decreases GA 2-oxidation in barley. Auxin also regulates GA biosynthesis during fruit development in peas. These discoveries in different plant species suggest the auxin regulation of GA metabolism may be a universal mechanism.

Ethylene decreases the concentration of bioactive GAs.

=== Regulation by environmental factors ===
Recent evidence suggests fluctuations in GA concentration influence light-regulated seed germination, photomorphogenesis during de-etiolation, and photoperiod regulation of stem elongation and flowering. Microarray analysis showed about one fourth cold-responsive genes are related to GA-regulated genes, which suggests GA influences response to cold temperatures. Plants reduce growth rate when exposed to stress. A relationship between GA levels and amount of stress experienced has been suggested in barley.

=== Role in seed development ===
Bioactive GAs and abscisic acid (ABA) levels have an inverse relationship and regulate seed development and germination. Levels of FUS3, an Arabidopsis transcription factor, are upregulated by ABA and downregulated by Giberellins, which suggests that there is a regulation loop that establishes the balance of Gibberellins and Abscisic Acid.

In practice, this means that farmers can alter this balance to make all fruits mature a little later, at a same time, or 'glue' the fruit in the trees until the harvest day (because ABA participates in the maturation of the fruits, and many crops mature and drop a few fruits a day for several weeks, that is undesirable for markets).

== Signalling mechanism ==
=== Receptor ===
In the early 1990s, there were several lines of evidence that suggested the existence of a GA receptor in oat seeds located at the plasma membrane. However, despite intensive research, to date, no membrane-bound GA receptor has been isolated. This, along with the discovery of a soluble receptor, GA insensitive dwarf 1 (GID1) has led many to doubt that a membrane-bound receptor exists.

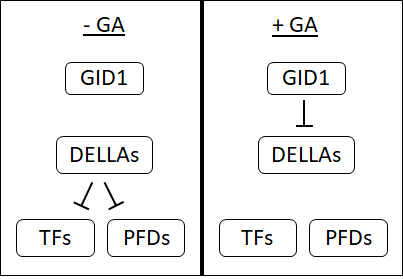
GA-GID1-DELLA signal pathway: In the absence of GA, DELLA proteins bind to and inhibit transcription factors (TFs) and prefoldins (PFDs). When GA is present, GID1 triggers the degradation of DELLAs and releases the TFs and PFDs.

GID1 was first identified in rice and in Arabidopsis there are three orthologs of GID1, AtGID1a, b, and c. GID1s have a high affinity for bioactive GAs. GA binds to a specific binding pocket on GID1; the C3-hydroxyl on GA makes contact with tyrosine-31 in the GID1 binding pocket. GA binding to GID1 causes changes in GID1 structure, causing a 'lid' on GID1 to cover the GA binding pocket. The movement of this lid results in the exposure of a surface which enables the binding of GID1 to DELLA proteins.

=== DELLA proteins: Repression of a repressor ===
DELLA proteins (such as SLR1 in rice or GAI and RGA in Arabidopsis) are repressors of plant development, characterized by the presence of a DELLA motif (aspartate-glutamate-leucine-leucine-alanine or D-E-L-L-A in the single letter amino acid code).

DELLAs inhibit seed germination, seed growth, flowering and GA reverses these effects. When Gibberellins bind to the GID1 receptor, it enhances the interaction between GID1 and DELLA proteins, forming a GA-GID1-DELLA complex. In that complex it is thought that the structure of DELLA proteins experience changes, enabling their binding to F-box proteins for their degradation. F-box proteins (SLY1 in Arabidopsis or GID2 in rice) catalyse the addition of ubiquitin to their targets. Adding ubiquitin to DELLA proteins promotes their degradation via the 26S-proteosome. This releases cells from DELLAs repressive effects.

=== Targets of DELLA proteins ===
==== Transcription factors ====
The first targets of DELLA proteins identified were Phytochrome Interacting Factors (PIFs). PIFs are transcription factors that negatively regulate light signalling and are strong promoters of elongation growth. In the presence of GA, DELLAs are degraded and this then allows PIFs to promote elongation. It was later found that DELLAs repress a large number of other transcription factors, among which are positive regulators of auxin, brassinosteroid and ethylene signalling. DELLAs can repress transcription factors either by stopping their binding to DNA or by promoting their degradation.

==== Prefoldins and microtubule assembly ====
In addition to repressing transcription factors, DELLAs also bind to prefoldins (PFDs). PFDs are molecular chaperones (they assist in the folding of other proteins) that work in the cytosol, but when DELLAs bind to them are restricted to the nucleus. An important function of PFDs is to assist in the folding of β-tubulin, a vital component of the cytoskeleton in the form of microtubules. As such, in the absence of Gibberellins (high level of DELLA proteins), PFDs reduce its activity, leading to a lower cellular pool of β-tubulin. When GA is present the DELLAs are degraded, PFDs can move to the cytosol and assist in the folding of β-tubulin. As such, GA allows for re-organisation of the cytoskeleton, and the elongation of cells.

Microtubules are also required for the trafficking of membrane vesicles, that is needed for the correct positioning of several hormone transporters. One of the most well characterized hormone transporters are PIN proteins, which are responsible for the movement of the hormone auxin between cells. In the absence of Gibberellins, DELLA proteins reduce the levels of microtubules and thereby inhibit membrane vesicle trafficking. This reduces the level of PIN proteins at the cell membrane, and the level of auxin in the cell. GA reverses this process and allows for PIN protein trafficking to the cell membrane to enhance the level of auxin in the cell.
