= Trehalose synthase =

Trehalose Synthase may refer to:

- Alpha,alpha-trehalose synthase, an enzyme
- Maltose alpha-D-glucosyltransferase, an enzyme
