= Delta3-cis-Delta2-trans-enoyl-CoA isomerase =

Delta3-cis-Delta2-trans-enoyl-CoA isomerase may refer to:

- Dodecenoyl-CoA isomerase, an enzyme
- Vinylacetyl-CoA Delta-isomerase, an enzyme
