= Gibberellin 3beta-dioxygenase =

gibberellin 3-beta-dioxygenase

Identifiers
- EC no.: 1.14.11.15
- CAS no.: 116036-68-1

Databases
- IntEnz: IntEnz view
- BRENDA: BRENDA entry
- ExPASy: NiceZyme view
- KEGG: KEGG entry
- MetaCyc: metabolic pathway
- PRIAM: profile
- PDB structures: RCSB PDB PDBe PDBsum
- Gene Ontology: AmiGO / QuickGO
Search
- PMC: articles
- PubMed: articles
- NCBI: proteins

In enzymology, a gibberellin 3beta-dioxygenase (EC 1.14.11.15) is an enzyme that catalyzes the chemical reaction

gibberellin 20 + 2-oxoglutarate + O_{2} $\rightleftharpoons$ gibberellin 1 + succinate + CO_{2}

The 3 substrates of this enzyme are gibberellin 20, 2-oxoglutarate, and O_{2}, whereas its 3 products are gibberellin 1, succinate, and CO_{2}.

This enzyme belongs to the family of oxidoreductases, specifically those acting on paired donors, with O2 as the oxidant. The oxygen incorporated need not be derived from O2 with 2-oxoglutarate as one donor, and one atom of oxygen is incorporated into each donor. The systematic name of this enzyme class is (gibberellin-20), 2-oxoglutarate: oxygen oxidoreductase (3beta-hydroxylating). Other names in common use include gibberellin 3beta-hydroxylase, (gibberrellin-20), 2-oxoglutarate: oxygen oxidoreductase and (3beta-hydroxylating). This enzyme participates in diterpenoid biosynthesis. It has 2 cofactors: iron and Ascorbate.
