= FABM =

FABM may refer to:

- Trans-2-decenoyl-(acyl-carrier protein) isomerase, an enzyme
- Bethlehem Airport, ICAO code
