= Paclobutrazol =

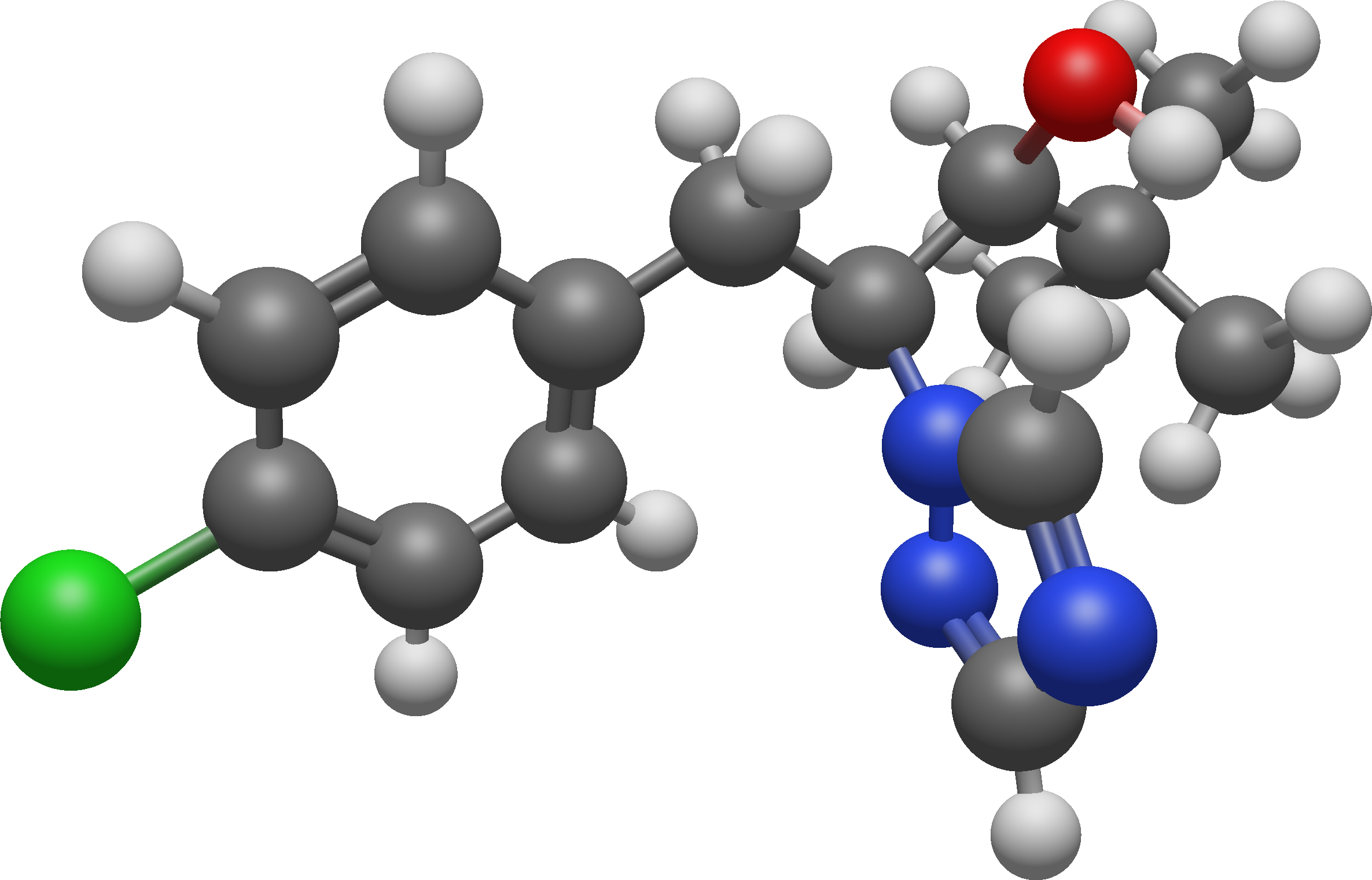

Names
- IUPAC name (2RS,3RS)-1-(4-Chlorophenyl)-4,4-dimethyl-2-(1H-1,2,4-triazol-1-yl)-3-pentanol
- Other names PP333

Identifiers
CAS Number	PBZ: 76738-62-0
3D model (JSmol)	PBZ: Interactive image
Abbreviations	PBZ
ChEBI	PBZ: CHEBI:73162
ChemSpider	(2R,3R) isomer: 139083; (2S,3S) isomer: 66322
ECHA InfoCard	100.121.374
PubChem CID	(2R,3R) isomer: 158076; (2S,3S) isomer: 73671
UNII	PBZ: 6PLV42R3ZA
CompTox Dashboard (EPA)	PBZ: DTXSID30216556
- InChI: InChI=1S/C15H20ClN3O/c1-15(2,3)14(20)13(19-10-17-9-18-19)8-11-4-6-12(16)7-5-11/h4-7,9-10,13-14,20H,8H2,1-3H3/t13-,14+/m0/s1 Key: RMOGWMIKYWRTKW-UONOGXRCSA-N; PBZ: InChI=1/C15H20ClN3O/c1-15(2,3)14(20)13(19-10-17-9-18-19)8-11-4-6-12(16)7-5-11/h4-7,9-10,13-14,20H,8H2,1-3H3/t13-,14+/m0/s1 Key: RMOGWMIKYWRTKW-DUXBJXIBNA-N; (2R,3R) isomer: Key: RMOGWMIKYWRTKW-KGLIPLIRSA-N; (2S,3S) isomer: Key: RMOGWMIKYWRTKW-UONOGXRCSA-N
- SMILES: PBZ: CC(C)(C)[C@@H]([C@H](CC1=CC=C(C=C1)Cl)N2C=NC=N2)O

Properties
Chemical formula	C_{15}H_{20}ClN_{3}O
Molar mass	293.80 g·mol^{−1}
Appearance	White crystalline solid
Density	1.23 g/cm^{3}
Melting point	165-166°C
Boiling point	460.9 °C (861.6 °F; 734.0 K) at 760 mHg
Solubility in water	22.9 mg/L (20 °C)
log P	3.11

Hazards
- Occupational safety and health (OHS/OSH)
Main hazards	Xn
Flash point	232.6 °C (450.7 °F; 505.8 K)
- Except where otherwise noted, data are given for materials in their standard state (at 25 °C [77 °F], 100 kPa). Infobox references

Paclobutrazol (PBZ) is the ISO common name for an organic compound that is used as a plant growth retardant and triazole fungicide. It is a known antagonist of the plant hormone gibberellin, acting by inhibiting gibberellin biosynthesis, reducing internodal growth to give stouter stems, increasing root growth, causing early fruitset and increasing seedset in plants such as tomato and pepper. PBZ has also been shown to reduce frost sensitivity in plants. Moreover, paclobutrazol can be used as a chemical approach for reducing the risk of lodging in cereal crops. PBZ has been used by arborists to reduce shoot growth and shown to have additional positive effects on trees and shrubs. Among those are improved resistance to drought stress, darker green leaves, higher resistance against fungi and bacteria, and enhanced development of roots. Cambial growth, as well as shoot growth, has been shown to be reduced in some tree species.

== Structure and synthesis ==
The first synthesis of paclobutrazol was disclosed in patents filed by an ICI group working at Jealott's Hill.

4-Chlorobenzaldehyde and pinacolone are combined in an aldol condensation to form a chalcone which is hydrogenated using Raney nickel as catalyst to give a substituted ketone. This material is brominated and the resulting compound treated with the sodium salt of 1,2,4-triazole in a nucleophilic substitution reaction. The final reduction reaction uses sodium borohydride, which in cold methanol gives almost exclusively the diastereomer pair having the absolute configuration (2R,3R) and its enantiomer (2S,3S), with only about 2% of the alternative (2R,3S) and (2S,3R) isomers. However, this pair of isomers can be produced when the reduction is carried out using butylmagnesium bromide.

In a 1984 study, ICI workers separated the individual enantiomers by chiral resolution and were able to demonstrate that only the (2R,3R) isomer displays substantial fungicidal activity, whereas the (2S,3S) isomer is responsible for the growth regulating properties. However, the commercial product (developed under the code number PP333) was the racemic material, since separation of the isomers was unnecessary when both components had utility in agriculture.

== Mechanism of action ==
Paclobutrazol binds to the heme containing active site of cytochrome P450 class enzymes. The (2S,3S) isomer inhibits the enzyme ent-kaurene oxidase which part of the main biosynthetic pathway to gibberellins, which are important plant hormones. A secondary effect arising from the inhibition of ent-kaurene oxidase is that its precursor, geranylgeranyl pyrophosphate accumulates in the plant and some of this is diverted into additional production of the phytol group of chlorophyll and the hormone abscisic acid. The latter is responsible for controlling transpiration of water through the leaves and hence PBZ treatment can lead to better tolerance of drought conditions. The (2R,3R) isomer is a better fit to the active site of the fungal cytochrome P450 14α-demethylase. This inhibits the conversion of lanosterol to ergosterol, a component of the fungal cell membrane, which is lethal for many species. Many other azole derivatives including propiconazole and tebuconazole show this type of activity, so the main commercial opportunity for paclobutrazol was as a plant growth retardant and it was first marketed by ICI in 1985 under the trade names Bonzi, Clipper, Cultar and Parlay.

== Usage ==
As an antagonist of gibberellin biosynthesis, PBZ has a growth retardant effect on most plant species. It is absorbed by plant tissues and transported via the xylem to the growing parts, where the rate of cell division is reduced compared to untreated plants and the new cells do not elongate.

=== Ornamental crops ===
PBZ is used in horticulture, especially for glasshouse-reared perennial plants.

=== Trees and shrubs ===
The ability of PBZ to reduce the growth of trees and shrubs means that it has found use in areas where there is a need to moderate such growth, for example under electric power lines and where a right-of-way is to be maintained. A single application of the growth regulator can give season-long control.

=== Fruit and vegetables ===
PBZ is used to increase the quantity and quality of orchard fruit and of vegetables. The quality is measured by elevated amounts of carbohydrates, total soluble solids (TSS), the TSS/titratable acidity ratio and a decreased acidity. It stimulates the growth of roots and stems and maintains the number of the leaves but suppresses the height of the plants.

=== Turf management ===
PBZ has been extensively used as a means to improve the quality of turf on golf courses, where it reduces the need for mowing and by increasing chlorophyll content has the effect of greening the grass.

=== Cereal crops ===
By diverting the plant's productivity from stem elongation into seed production, PBZ is demonstrated to increase grain yields and reduce lodging, demonstrated by Kamran et al., 2017 and Tekalign 2007. The same mechanism is responsible for modern high-yield semi-dwarf crops such as the IR8 rice variety. Peng et al., 2014 also describe better lodging tolerance. They find that winter wheat undergoes reduction of internode length, thickened internodes, increased lateral growth, increased lignin synthesis enzyme activity and therefore increased lignification with application of this compound. Although this does not reduce lodging it does make lodging less harmful.

== Effects on the environment ==
PBZ has been the subject of extensive regulatory studies, including in the European Union and the US. These data have been summarised. It was assessed as being of moderate acute toxicity, mildly irritating to skin and eyes and unlikely to be genotoxic or carcinogenic to humans. PBZ is relatively stable in water and soil. Under laboratory aerobic or anaerobic conditions, the half-life of paclobutrazol can be higher than one year. However, in a 2010 quantitative analysis, PBZ was detected in only 3 out of 440 groundwater samples from golf turf areas with a maximum concentration of 4.2 μg/L. In Europe, the highest tolerable concentration of paclobutrazol in drinking water is 66 μg/L.

== As research tool ==
PBZ has been used as a tool to investigate the genes associated with gibberellin biosynthesis in plants. For example, the Arabidopsis allele gai-t6 (of the giberellic acid interacting gene) confers resistance to paclobutrazol's damage to vegetative growth. However, in normal use, there is no selective pressure on plants to develop resistance to PBZ since it is not lethal to them.
