= Ent-Copalyl diphosphate synthase =

ent-Copalyl diphosphate synthase

Identifiers
- EC no.: 5.5.1.13
- CAS no.: 9055-64-5

Databases
- IntEnz: IntEnz view
- BRENDA: BRENDA entry
- ExPASy: NiceZyme view
- KEGG: KEGG entry
- MetaCyc: metabolic pathway
- PRIAM: profile
- PDB structures: RCSB PDB PDBe PDBsum
- Gene Ontology: AmiGO / QuickGO
Search
- PMC: articles
- PubMed: articles
- NCBI: proteins

In enzymology, an ent-copalyl diphosphate synthase (EC 5.5.1.13) is an enzyme that catalyzes the chemical reaction:

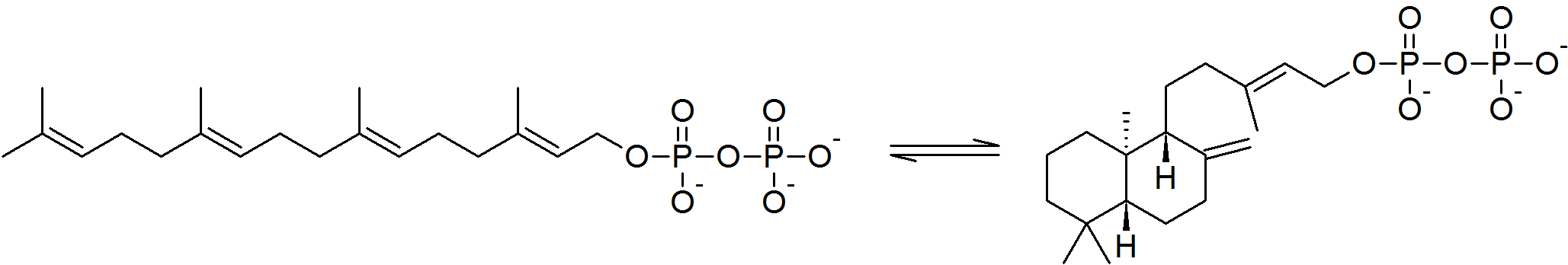

Hence, this enzyme has one substrate, geranylgeranyl pyrophosphate, and one product, ent-copalyl pyrophosphate. This enzyme participates in gibberellin biosynthesis.

This enzyme belongs to the family of isomerases, specifically the class of intramolecular lyases. The systematic name of this enzyme class is ent-copalyl-diphosphate lyase (decyclizing).

== Bifunctionality ==
ent-Copalyl diphosphate synthases from fungi and mosses also have a distinct ent-kaurene synthase activity associated with the same protein molecule. The reaction catalyzed by ent-kaurene synthase is the next step in the biosynthetic pathway to gibberellins. The two types of enzymic activity are distinct, and site-directed mutagenesis to suppress the ent-kaurene synthase activity of the protein leads to build up of ent-copalyl pyrophosphate. Inhibition of ent-kaurene synthase activity, by replacing Mg^{2+} in the growth medium with Ni^{2+}, has the same effect.

Higher plants typically have separate proteins for ent-copalyl diphosphate synthase and ent-kaurene synthase, although these may be associated as weakly bound dimers or enzyme complexes. Rice (Oryza sativa) has two distinct ent-copalyl diphosphate synthases, which participate in distinct metabolic pathways. Only one ent-copalyl diphosphate synthase has been isolated from a bacterial species (Streptomyces sp. strain KO-3988): it is also monofunctional.

As might be expected, the bifunctional enzymes from lower plants are larger (946–960 residues, 106–107 kDa) than the monofunctional enzymes from higher plants (800–867 residues, 90–98 kDa), although not by twice as much. The independent ent-kaurene syntheses in higher plants, of which there may be several per species, are much more heterogenous in size, ranging 161–816 residues, 19–94 kDa.

== Localization and function ==
ent-Copalyl diphosphate synthase has been isolated from a number of tissues in higher plants: cotyledon, hypocotyl and roots of sunflowers (Helianthus annuus) and Cucamonga manroot (Marah macrocarpus); endosperm of squash (Cucurbita maxima) and manroot (M. macrocarpus); and leaves of rice (Oryza sativa). It has been localized to the chloroplast stroma in peas (Pisum sativum) and wheat (Triticum aestivum).

The reaction catalyzed by ent-copalyl diphosphate synthase can be seen as the first committed step in gibberellin biosynthesis. Gibberellins form an important group of plant hormones, with various functions in different species and at different stages of the plant's lifetime. Disorders in gibberellin biosynthesis commonly show themselves as growth disorders, particularly as dwarfism, and some of those can be traced to reduced ent-copalyl diphosphate synthase activity. The importance of ent-copalyl diphosphate synthase in plant hormone production – primary metabolism – explains its widespread distribution both among species and among different plant tissues.

However, gibberellins are not the only phytochemicals produced from ent-copalyl pyrophosphate. A wide range of secondary metabolites, both terpenes and alkaloids, are also derived either from ent-copalyl pyrophosphate itself or from ent-kaurene or ent-kaurenoic acid, the next two intermediates on the metabolic pathway to gibberellins. Knowledge of these secondary metabolic pathways is much less extensive than that of gibberellin biosynthesis, and is often little more than conjecture. (Note: Such conjecture is not, of course, without evidence. It can be clear from the structure of a secondary metabolite that it is almost certainly derived from ent-copalyl pyrophosphate without knowing the details of how the transformation is carried out in living plants.)

It is known that ent-copalyl diphosphate synthase is produced by maize plants (Zea mays) in response to attack by Fusarium fungi, which suggests that it might play a role in plant defences as a precursor to phytoalexins (defensive compounds produced by the plant). Rice plants produce (at least) two different types of ent-copalyl diphosphate synthase, and only one of those participates in the production of gibberellins, suggesting again that the other is involved in the production of phytoalexins.
