= Beta-lysine 5,6-aminomutase =

Class of enzymes

beta-lysine 5,6-aminomutase

Identifiers
- EC no.: 5.4.3.3
- CAS no.: 9075-69-8

Databases
- IntEnz: IntEnz view
- BRENDA: BRENDA entry
- ExPASy: NiceZyme view
- KEGG: KEGG entry
- MetaCyc: metabolic pathway
- PRIAM: profile
- PDB structures: RCSB PDB PDBe PDBsum
- Gene Ontology: AmiGO / QuickGO
Search
- PMC: articles
- PubMed: articles
- NCBI: proteins

In enzymology, a beta-lysine 5,6-aminomutase (EC 5.4.3.3) is an enzyme that catalyzes the chemical reaction

(3S)-3,6-diaminohexanoate $\rightleftharpoons$ (3S,5S)-3,5-diaminohexanoate

Hence, this enzyme has one substrate, (3S)-3,6-diaminohexanoate, and one product, (3S,5S)-3,5-diaminohexanoate.

This enzyme belongs to the family of isomerases, specifically those intramolecular transferases transferring amino groups. The systematic name of this enzyme class is (3S)-3,6-diaminohexanoate 5,6-aminomutase. Other names in common use include beta-lysine mutase, and L-beta-lysine 5,6-aminomutase. This enzyme participates in lysine degradation. It employs one cofactor, cobamide.

== Structural studies ==
As of late 2007, only one structure has been solved for this class of enzymes, with the PDB accession code 1XRS.
