= Steroid Delta-isomerase =

Class of enzymes

Steroid Δ-isomerase
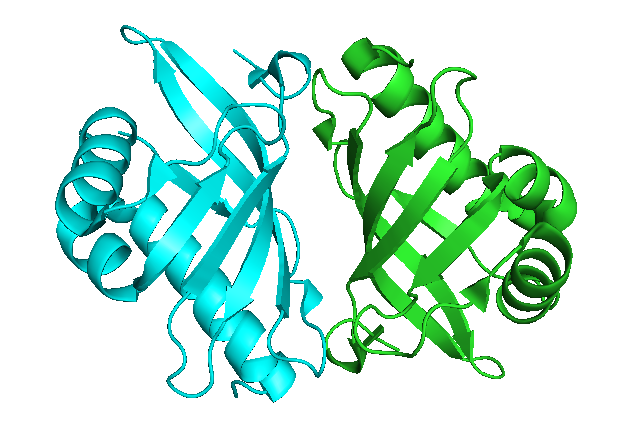
- Crystallographic structure of Pseudomonas putida steroid Δ^{5}-isomerase homodimer.

Identifiers
- EC no.: 5.3.3.1
- CAS no.: 9031-36-1

Databases
- IntEnz: IntEnz view
- BRENDA: BRENDA entry
- ExPASy: NiceZyme view
- KEGG: KEGG entry
- MetaCyc: metabolic pathway
- PRIAM: profile
- PDB structures: RCSB PDB PDBe PDBsum
- Gene Ontology: AmiGO / QuickGO
Search
- PMC: articles
- PubMed: articles
- NCBI: proteins

In enzymology, a steroid Δ^{5}-isomerase (EC 5.3.3.1) is an enzyme that catalyzes the chemical reaction

a 3-oxo-Δ^{5}-steroid $\rightleftharpoons$ a 3-oxo-Δ^{4}-steroid

Hence, this enzyme has one substrate, a 3-oxo-Δ^{5}-steroid, and one product, a 3-oxo-Δ^{4}-steroid.

== Introduction ==
This enzyme belongs to the family of isomerases, specifically those intramolecular oxidoreductases transposing C=C bonds. The systematic name of this enzyme class is 3-oxosteroid Δ^{5}-Δ^{4}-isomerase. Other names in common use include ketosteroid isomerase (KSI), hydroxysteroid isomerase, steroid isomerase, Δ^{5}-ketosteroid isomerase, Δ^{5}(or Δ^{4})-3-keto steroid isomerase, Δ^{5}-steroid isomerase, 3-oxosteroid isomerase, Δ^{5}-3-keto steroid isomerase, and Δ^{5}-3-oxosteroid isomerase.

KSI has been studied extensively from the bacteria Comamonas testosteroni (TI), formerly referred to as Pseudomonas testosteroni, and Pseudomonas putida (PI). The enzymes from these two sources are 34% homologous, and structural studies have shown that the placement of the catalytic groups in the active sites is virtually identical. Mammalian KSI has been studied from bovine adrenal cortex and rat liver. This enzyme participates in c21-steroid hormone metabolism and androgen and estrogen metabolism. An example substrate is Δ^{5}-androstene-3,17-dione, which KSI converts to Δ^{4}-androstene-3,17-dione. The above reaction in the absence of enzyme takes 7 weeks to complete in aqueous solution. KSI performs this reaction on an order of 10^{11} times faster, ranking it among the most proficient enzymes known. Bacterial KSI also serves as a model protein for studying enzyme catalysis and protein folding.

== Structural studies ==
KSI exists as a homodimer with two identical halves. The interface between the two monomers is narrow and well defined, consisting of neutral or apolar amino acids, suggesting the hydrophobic interaction is important for dimerization. Results show that the dimerization is essential to function. The active site is highly apolar and folds around the substrate in a manner similar to other enzymes with hydrophobic substrates, suggesting this fold is characteristic for binding hydrophobic substrates.

No complete atomic structure of KSI appeared until 1997, when an NMR structure of TI KSI was reported. This structure showed that the active site is a deep hydrophobic pit with Asp-38 and Tyr-14 located at the bottom of this pit. The structure is thus entirely consistent with the proposed mechanistic roles of Asp-38 and Tyr-14.

Residue Role	Comamonas testosteroni (PDB: 8CHO)	Pseudomonas putida (PDB: 1OH0)
Oxyanion H-Bond Donor(s)	Asp-99	Asp-103
Oxyanion H-Bond Donor(s)	Tyr-14	Tyr-16
General Acid/Base	Asp-38	Asp-40

As of late 2007, 25 structures have been solved for this class of enzymes, with PDB accession codes 1BUQ, 1C7H, 1CQS, 1DMM, 1DMN, 1DMQ, 1E97, 1GS3, 1ISK, 1K41, 1OCV, 1OGX, 1OGZ, 1OH0, 1OHO, 1OHP, 1OHS, 1OPY, 1VZZ, 1W00, 1W01, 1W02, 1W6Y, 2PZV, and 8CHO.

== Mechanism ==
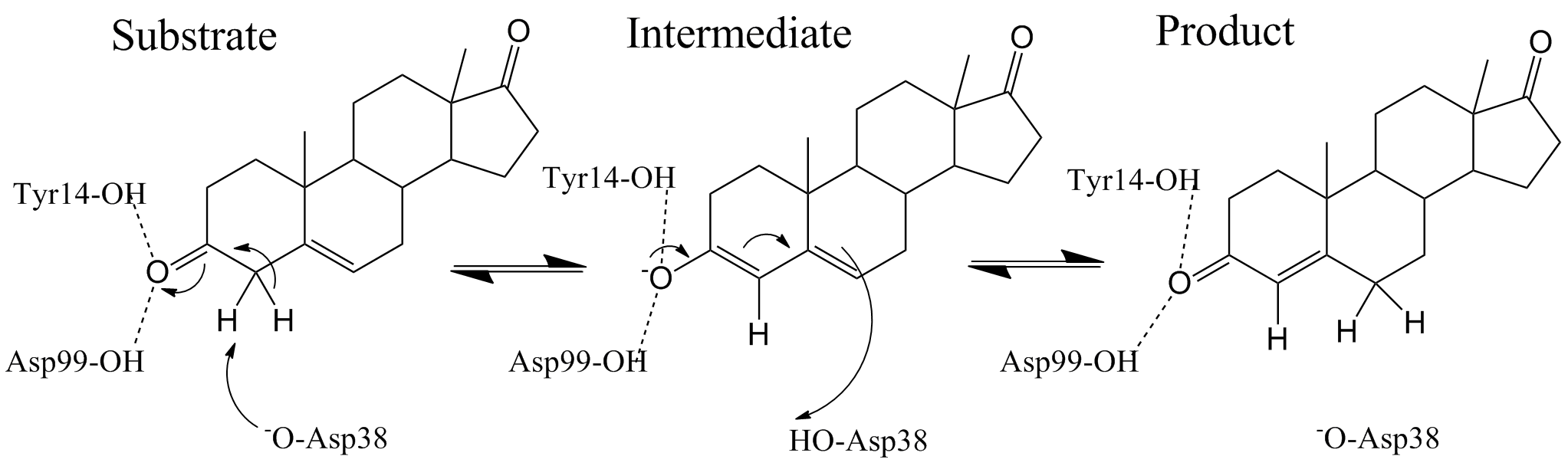
A schematic description of the isomerization catalyzed by C. testosteroni steroid delta-isomerase.

KSI catalyzes the rearrangement of a carbon-carbon double bond in ketosteroids through an enolate intermediate at a diffusion-limited rate. There have been conflicting results on the ionization state of the intermediate, whether it exists as the enolate or enol. Pollack uses a thermodynamic argument to suggest the intermediate exists as the enolate. The general base Asp-38 abstracts a proton from position 4 (alpha to the carbonyl, next to the double bond) of the steroid ring to form an enolate (the rate-limiting step) that is stabilized by the hydrogen bond donating Tyr-14 and Asp-99. Tyr-14 and Asp-99 are positioned deep within the hydrophobic active site and form a so-called oxanion hole. Protonated Asp-38 then transfers its proton to position 6 of the steroid ring to complete the reaction.

Although the mechanistic steps of the reaction are not disputed, the contributions of various factors to catalysis such as electrostatics, hydrogen bonding of the oxyanion hole, and distal binding effects are discussed below and still debated.

The Warshel group applied statistical mechanical computational methods and empirical valence bond theory to previous experimental data. It was determined that electrostatic preorganization-including ionic residues and fixed dipoles within the active site-contributes most to KSI catalysis. More specifically, Tyr-14 and Asp-99 dipoles work to stabilize the growing charge which accumulates on the enolate oxygen (O-3) throughout catalysis. In a similar way, the charge on Asp38 is stabilized by surrounding residues and a water molecule during the course of the reaction. The Boxer group used experimental Stark spectroscopy methods to identify the presence of H-bond-mediated electric fields within the KSI active site. These measurements quantified the electrostatic contribution to KSI catalysis (70%).

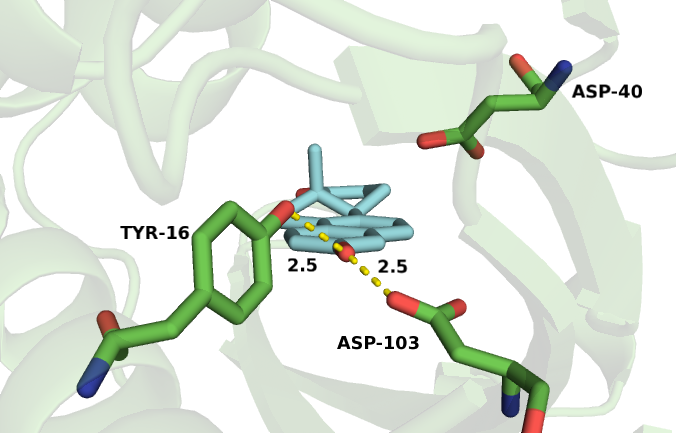
Close up structure of the KSI (Pseudomonas putida) active site bound to equilenin (aromatic substrate analog) from the vantage point of the oxyanion hole with hydrogen bond lengths (Angstroms) and residue names labeled (PDB: 1OH0).

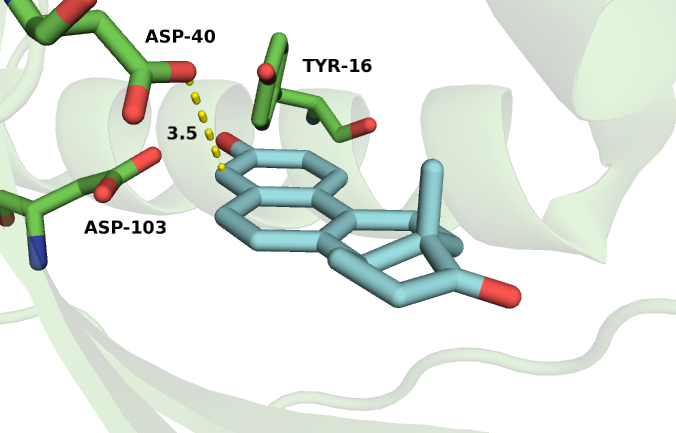
Close up structure of the KSI (Pseudomonas putida) active site bound to equilenin (aromatic substrate analog) highlighting proximity of the general acid/base to the substrate (PDB: 1OH0).

The active site is lined with hydrophobic residues to accommodate the substrate, but Asp-99 and Tyr-14 are within hydrogen bonding distance of O-3. The hydrogen bonds from Tyr-14 and Asp-99 are known to significantly affect the rate of catalysis in KSI. Mutagenesis of this residue to alanine (D99A) or asparagine (D99N) results in a loss in activity at pH 7 of 3000-fold and 27-fold, respectively, implicating Asp-99 as important for enzymatic activity. Wu et al. proposed a mechanism that involves both Tyr-14 and Asp-99 forming hydrogen bonds directly to O-3 of the steroid. This mechanism was challenged by Zhao et al., who postulated a hydrogen bonding network with Asp-99 hydrogen bonding to Tyr-14, which in turn forms a hydrogen bond to O-3. More recently, the Herschlag group utilized unnatural amino acid incorporation to assay the importance of Tyr-14 to KSI catalysis. The natural tyrosine residue was substituted with unnatural halogenated amino acids surveying a range of pKa's. There was very little difference in KSI catalytic turnover with decreasing pKa, suggesting, in contrast to the electrostatic studies outlined above, that oxyanion hole stabilization is not primarily important for catalysis.

Wild-Type KSI Reaction Kinetics on 5-Androstenedione
k_{cat} (s^{−1})	3.0 × 10^{4}
K_{m} (μM)	123
k_{cat}/K_{m} (M^{−1}s^{−1})	2.4 × 10^{8}

Asp-38 general acidic/basic activity and effective molarity was probed by the Herschlag group through site-directed mutagenesis and exogenous base rescue. Asp-38 was mutated to Gly, nullifying catalytic activity, and exogenous rescue was attempted with carboxylates of varying size and molarity. By calculating the concentration of base needed for full rescue, the Herschlag group determined the effective molarity of Asp-38 in KSI (6400 M). Thus, Asp-38 is critical for KSI catalysis.

Sigala et al. found that solvent exclusion and replacement by the remote hydrophobic steroid rings negligibly alter the electrostatic environment within the KSI oxyanion hole. In addition, ligand binding does not grossly alter the conformations of backbone and side chain groups observed in X-ray structures of PI KSI. However, NMR and UV studies suggest that steroid binding restricts the motions of several active-site groups, including Tyr-16. Recently, the Herschlag group proposed that remote binding of hydrophobic regions of the substrate to distal portions of the active site contribute to KSI catalysis (>5 kcal/mol). A 4-ring substrate reacted 27,000 times faster than a single ring substrate indicating the importance of distal active site binding motifs. This activity ratio persists throughout mutagenesis of residues important to oxyanion hole stabilization, implying that distal binding is what accounts for the large aforementioned reactivity difference.

Numerous physical changes occur upon steroid binding within the KSI active site. In the free enzyme an ordered water molecule is positioned within hydrogen-bonding distance of Tyr-16 (the PI equivalent of TI KSI Tyr-14) and Asp-103 (the PI equivalent of TI KSI Asp-99). This and additional disordered water molecules present within the unliganded active site are displaced upon steroid binding and are substantially excluded by the dense constellation of hydrophobic residues that pack around the bound, hydrophobic steroid skeleton.

As stated above, the degree to which various factors contribute to KSI catalysis is still debated.

== Function ==
KSI occurs in animal tissues concerned with steroid hormone biosynthesis, such as the adrenal, testis, and ovary. KSI in Comamomas testosteroni is used in the degradation pathway of steroids, allowing this bacteria to utilize steroids containing a double bond at Δ^{5}, such as testosterone, as its sole source of carbon. In mammals, transfer of a double bond at Δ^{5} to Δ^{4} is catalyzed by 3-β-hydroxy-Δ^{5}-steroid dehydrogenase at the same time as the dehydroxylation of 3-β-hydroxyl group to ketone group, while in C. testosteroni and P. putida, Δ^{5},3-ketosteroid isomerase just transfers a double bond at Δ^{5} of 3-ketosteroid to Δ^{4}.

A Δ^{5}-3-ketosteroid isomerase-disrupted mutant of strain TA441 can grow on dehydroepiandrosterone, which has a double bond at Δ^{5}, but cannot grow on epiandrosterone, which lacks a double bond at Δ^{5}, indicating that C. testosteroni KSI is responsible for transfer of the double bond from Δ^{5} to Δ^{4} and transfer of the double bond by hydrogenation at Δ^{5} and following dehydrogenation at Δ^{4} is not possible.

== Model enzyme ==
KSI has been used as a model system to test different theories to explain how enzymes achieve their catalytic efficiency. Low-barrier hydrogen bonds and unusual pKa values for the catalytic residues have been proposed as the basis for the fast action of KSI. Gerlt and Gassman proposed the formation of unusually short, strong hydrogen bonds between KSI oxanion hole and the reaction intermediate as a means of catalytic rate enhancement. In their model, high-energy states along the reaction coordinate are specifically stabilized by the formation of these bonds. Since then, the catalytic role of short, strong hydrogen bonds has been debated. Another proposal explaining enzyme catalysis tested through KSI is the geometrical complementarity of the active site to the transition state, which proposes the active site electrostatics is complementary to the substrate transition state.

KSI has also been a model system for studying protein folding. Kim et al. studied the effect of folding and tertiary structure on the function of KSI.
