= Bornyl diphosphate synthase =

Class of enzymes

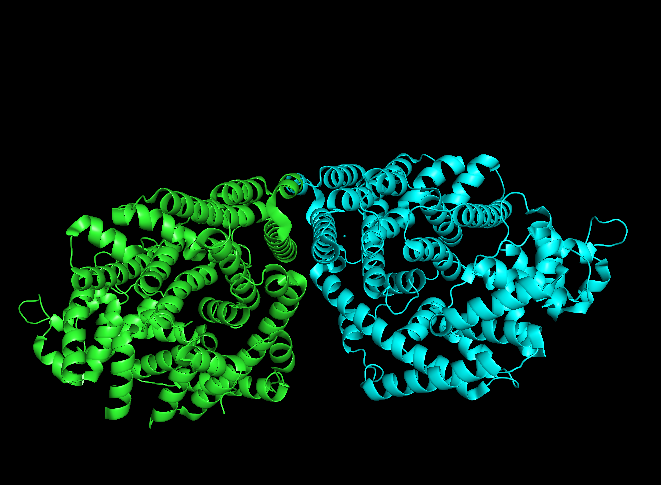
- Cartoon representation of crystal structure 1N1B colored by monomer.

Identifiers
- EC no.: 5.5.1.8
- CAS no.: 72668-91-8

Databases
- IntEnz: IntEnz view
- BRENDA: BRENDA entry
- ExPASy: NiceZyme view
- KEGG: KEGG entry
- MetaCyc: metabolic pathway
- PRIAM: profile
- PDB structures: RCSB PDB PDBe PDBsum
- Gene Ontology: AmiGO / QuickGO
Search
- PMC: articles
- PubMed: articles
- NCBI: proteins

In enzymology, bornyl diphosphate synthase (BPPS) (EC 5.5.1.8) is an enzyme that catalyzes the chemical reaction

geranyl diphosphate $\rightleftharpoons$ (+)-bornyl diphosphate

Bornyl diphosphate synthase is involved in the biosynthesis of the cyclic monoterpenoid bornyl diphosphate. As seen from the reaction above, BPPS takes geranyl diphosphate as its only substrate and isomerizes into the product, (+)- bornyl diphosphate. This reaction comes from a general class of enzymes called terpene syntheses that cyclize a universal precursor, geranyl diphosphate, to form varying monocyclic and bicyclic monoterpenes. The biochemical transformation of geranyl diphosphate to cyclic products occurs in a variety of aromatic plants, including both angiosperms and gymnosperms, and is used for various purposes described in sections below. Terpene syntheses like BPPS are the primary enzymes in the formation of low-molecular-weight terpene metabolites. The organization of terpene syntheses, their characteristic ability to form multiple products, and regulation in response to biotic and abiotic factors contribute to the formation of a diverse group of terpene metabolites. The structural diversity and complexity of terpenes generates an enormous potential for mediating plant–environment interactions.

The systematic name of this enzyme class is (+)-bornyl-diphosphate lyase (decyclizing). Other names in common use include bornyl pyrophosphate synthase, bornyl pyrophosphate synthetase, (+)-bornylpyrophosphate cyclase, and geranyl-diphosphate cyclase (ambiguous). This enzyme participates in monoterpenoid biosynthesis and belongs to the family of isomerases, specifically the class of intramolecular lyases.

The chirality of borneol in a plant depends on the preferred chirality of the bornyl diphosphate synthase. Syntheses for either chirality have been sequenced: this article deals with the better-characterized (+)-bornyl diphosphate synthase. In 2021, scientists discovered the first known (-)-bornyl diphosphate synthase.

== Mechanism ==
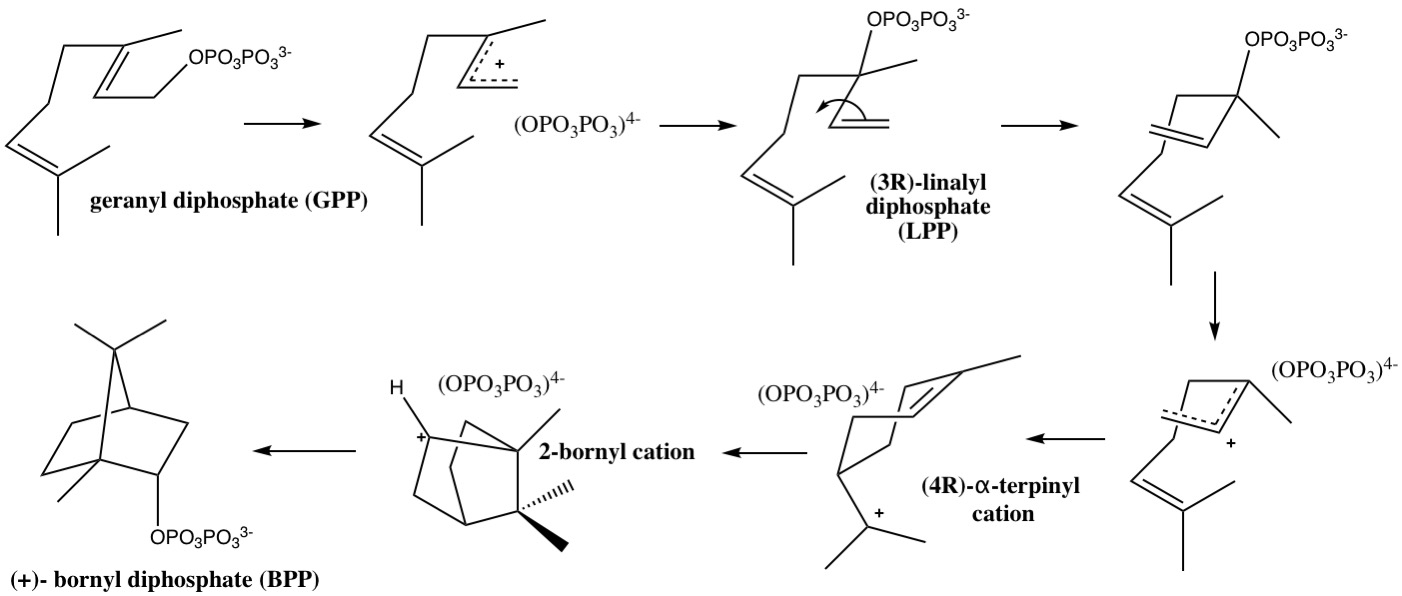
Cyclization of geranyl diphosphate into (+)- bornyl diphosphate synthase catalyzed by Bornyl Diphosphate Synthase

As seen in the mechanism above, bornyl diphosphate synthase catalyzes the cyclization cascade of GPP into (+)- bornyl diphosphate. Following the initial metal-activated diphosphate departure from GPP, the molecule isomerizes to linally diphosphate (LPP), which then allows for the rotation around the carbon-carbon bond, and consequent reattachment of the PPi group. The pyrophosphate then stabilizes the cyclization into the terpinyl cation, and another final cyclization yields the 2-bornyl cation. This cation is then neutralized by the stereo-specific C–O bond formation with the final re-attachment of pyrophosphate to create the final product, BPP. Careful consideration of the BPPS structure shows that the active site, discussed in further detail below, guides the positions and conformations of the isoprenoid functionality of the substrate, while the diphosphate position remains essentially anchored in a single location and conformation. Overall, the pyrophosphate plays an important role in stabilizing the carbocations formed throughout the cyclization in the active site of the enzyme. These interactions and the strategic positioning of pyrophosphate is what is believed to lead to its endo-specific recapture in the final step by the bornyl cation.

== Enzyme Structure ==
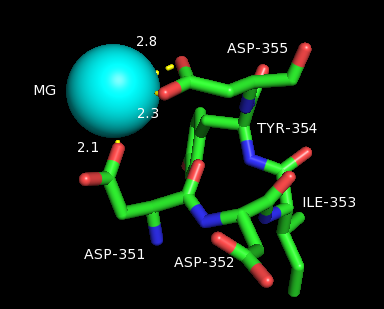
The aspartate rich segment helps stabilize the magnesium ion that activates the pyrophosphate leaving. Only D351 and D355 directly interact with the magnesium, but the entire aspartate-rich domain is shown for convenience. The numbers represent the coordination distance in angstroms.

The crystal structure of bornyl diphosphate synthase was the first structure of a monoterpene cyclase and was reported by the research group of David W. Christianson at the University of Pennsylvania. BPPS is a homodimeric isomerase, with each of the two monomers containing two α-helical domains. In the case of BPPS, the C-terminal domain directly catalyzes the cyclization of geranyl diphosphate, as seen in the above reaction mechanism, while the N-terminal domain acts as a scaffolding to the active site of the C-terminal during the reaction. The N-terminal domain forms similar α-barrels to that of other terpene cyclases such as epiaristolochene synthase and farnesyltransferase. In ligand complexes, such as with GPP, bornyl diphosphate synthase stabilizes the complex through multiple hydrogen bond interactions, specifically with aspartate-rich motifs. Additionally, arginines in the N terminus may play a stabilizing role in the initial isomerization step of the reaction cascade discussed in the section above. The C-terminal domain, on the other hand, contains 12 α-helices, which define the hydrophobic active site where the cyclization occurs. Critical amino acid segments found in the C-terminal domain are also what allow the required magnesium metal ions to bind and allow the first pyrophosphate release. Specifically, this is accomplished by an aspartate-rich domain DDIYD beginning at D351, in with the boldface represents the residues directly interacting with the magnesium ion, elucidated on the adjacent image.

As of late 2007, 7 structures have been solved for this class of enzymes, with PDB accession codes 1N1B, 1N1Z, 1N20, 1N21, 1N22, 1N23, and 1N24.

== Biological Function ==
Many properties of plants derive almost exclusively from monoterpene natural products: plants generate these compounds for molecular functions in regulation, communication, and defense. For examples, terpenes often have a strong odor and may protect the plants that produce them from herbivores by deterring them and by attracting predators of said herbivores. The monoterpenes characterized to-date reveal a vast array of structural and functional variations coming from different monocyclic or bicyclic skeletons. Despite this structural and stereochemical diversity, all monoterpenes derive from the same substrate, geranyl diphosphate (GPP). The cyclization of this C10-isoprenoid precursor through sequential carbocation intermediates, as seen in the above sections, and is catalyzed by metal-dependent enzymes: in this case, BPPS cyclizes GPP into bornyl diphosphate. However, the multitude of products coming from only a single substrate helps conclude that this diversity is a consequence of the evolution of variations in the enzyme. Each different enzyme holds an active site that chaperones intermediates through different cyclization pathways, and thus forms myriad monoterpenoids.

== Industrial Relevance ==
Historically, aromatic plants have been used for their pleasing fragrances, culinary applications, and therapeutic potential. Because bornyl diphosphate synthase is crucial in forming aromatic monoterpenoids within plants, this enzyme is of key industrial relevance. Specifically, while most studies focus on BPPS from Salvia officinalis, there has been a recent interest in studying LaBPPS, bornyl diphosphate synthase from lavender. This interest arises from the fact that lavender essential oils (EOs) of higher quality produced by a few Lavandula angustifolia variations are heavily sought after in the perfume industry. Compared to the BPPS of Salvia officinalis, LaBPPS showed several differences in amino acid sequence, and the products it catalyzes: in detail, the carbocation intermediates are more stable in LaBPPS than in regular BPPS, leading to a different efficiency of converting GPP into BPP. Given the novelty of LaBPP discovery, further research on this will most likely be of significant use to the perfume and fragrance industry.
