= Tyrosine 2,3-aminomutase =

tyrosine 2,3-aminomutase

Identifiers
- EC no.: 5.4.3.6
- CAS no.: 9073-38-5

Databases
- IntEnz: IntEnz view
- BRENDA: BRENDA entry
- ExPASy: NiceZyme view
- KEGG: KEGG entry
- MetaCyc: metabolic pathway
- PRIAM: profile
- PDB structures: RCSB PDB PDBe PDBsum
- Gene Ontology: AmiGO / QuickGO
Search
- PMC: articles
- PubMed: articles
- NCBI: proteins

In enzymology, a tyrosine 2,3-aminomutase (EC 5.4.3.6) is an enzyme that catalyzes the chemical reaction

L-tyrosine $\rightleftharpoons$ 3-amino-3-(4-hydroxyphenyl)propanoate

Hence, this enzyme has one substrate, L-tyrosine, and one product, 3-amino-3-(4-hydroxyphenyl)propanoate.

This enzyme belongs to the family of isomerases, specifically those intramolecular transferases transferring amino groups. The systematic name of this enzyme class is L-tyrosine 2,3-aminomutase. This enzyme is also called tyrosine alpha,beta-mutase. This enzyme participates in tyrosine metabolism. It employs one cofactor, 5-methylene-3,5-dihydroimidazol-4-one (MIO) which is formed autocatalytic rearrangement of the internal tripeptide Ala-Ser-Gly.

== Structural studies ==
As of late 2007, only one structure has been solved for this class of enzymes, with the PDB accession code 2OHY.
