= Farnesol 2-isomerase =

farnesol 2-isomerase

Identifiers
- EC no.: 5.2.1.9
- CAS no.: 94047-16-2

Databases
- IntEnz: IntEnz view
- BRENDA: BRENDA entry
- ExPASy: NiceZyme view
- KEGG: KEGG entry
- MetaCyc: metabolic pathway
- PRIAM: profile
- PDB structures: RCSB PDB PDBe PDBsum
- Gene Ontology: AmiGO / QuickGO
Search
- PMC: articles
- PubMed: articles
- NCBI: proteins

In enzymology, a farnesol 2-isomerase (EC 5.2.1.9) is an enzyme that catalyzes the chemical reaction

2-trans,6-trans-farnesol $\rightleftharpoons$ 2-cis,6-trans-farnesol

Hence, this enzyme has one substrate, 2-trans,6-trans-farnesol, and one product, 2-cis,6-trans-farnesol.

This enzyme belongs to the family of isomerases, specifically cis-trans isomerases. The systematic name of this enzyme class is 2-trans,6-trans-farnesol 2-cis-trans-isomerase. This enzyme is also called farnesol isomerase.
