= Furylfuramide isomerase =

furylfuramide isomerase

Identifiers
- EC no.: 5.2.1.6
- CAS no.: 72561-07-0

Databases
- IntEnz: IntEnz view
- BRENDA: BRENDA entry
- ExPASy: NiceZyme view
- KEGG: KEGG entry
- MetaCyc: metabolic pathway
- PRIAM: profile
- PDB structures: RCSB PDB PDBe PDBsum
- Gene Ontology: AmiGO / QuickGO
Search
- PMC: articles
- PubMed: articles
- NCBI: proteins

In enzymology, a furylfuramide isomerase (EC 5.2.1.6) is an enzyme that catalyzes the chemical reaction

(E)-2-(2-furyl)-3-(5-nitro-2-furyl)acrylamide $\rightleftharpoons$ (Z)-2-(2-furyl)-3-(5-nitro-2-furyl)acrylamide

Hence, this enzyme has one substrate, (E)-2-(2-furyl)-3-(5-nitro-2-furyl)acrylamide, and one product, (Z)-2-(2-furyl)-3-(5-nitro-2-furyl)acrylamide.

This enzyme belongs to the family of isomerases, specifically cis-trans isomerases. The systematic name of this enzyme class is 2-(2-furyl)-3-(5-nitro-2-furyl)acrylamide cis-trans-isomerase. It has 2 cofactors: NAD+, and NADH.
