= Maltose alpha-D-glucosyltransferase =

Maltose α-D-glucosyltransferase

Identifiers
- EC no.: 5.4.99.16

Databases
- IntEnz: IntEnz view
- BRENDA: BRENDA entry
- ExPASy: NiceZyme view
- KEGG: KEGG entry
- MetaCyc: metabolic pathway
- PRIAM: profile
- PDB structures: RCSB PDB PDBe PDBsum
- Gene Ontology: AmiGO / QuickGO
Search
- PMC: articles
- PubMed: articles
- NCBI: proteins

In enzymology, a maltose α-D-glucosyltransferase (EC 5.4.99.16) is an enzyme that catalyzes the chemical reaction

maltose $\rightleftharpoons$ alpha,alpha-trehalose

Hence, this enzyme has one substrate, maltose, and one product, alpha,alpha-trehalose.

This enzyme belongs to the family of isomerases, specifically those intramolecular transferases transferring other groups. The systematic name of this enzyme class is maltose alpha-D-glucosylmutase. Other names in common use include trehalose synthase, and maltose glucosylmutase. This enzyme participates in starch and sucrose metabolism.
