= Lysolecithin acylmutase =

lysolecithin acylmutase

Identifiers
- EC no.: 5.4.1.1
- CAS no.: 9031-24-7

Databases
- IntEnz: IntEnz view
- BRENDA: BRENDA entry
- ExPASy: NiceZyme view
- KEGG: KEGG entry
- MetaCyc: metabolic pathway
- PRIAM: profile
- PDB structures: RCSB PDB PDBe PDBsum
- Gene Ontology: AmiGO / QuickGO
Search
- PMC: articles
- PubMed: articles
- NCBI: proteins

In enzymology, a lysolecithin acylmutase (EC 5.4.1.1) is an enzyme that catalyzes the chemical reaction

2-lysolecithin $\rightleftharpoons$ 3-lysolecithin

Hence, this enzyme has one substrate, 2-lysolecithin, and one product, 3-lysolecithin.

This enzyme belongs to the family of isomerases, specifically those intramolecular transferases transferring acyl groups. The systematic name of this enzyme class is lysolecithin 2,3-acylmutase. This enzyme is also called lysolecithin migratase.
