= Trans-2-decenoyl-(acyl-carrier protein) isomerase =

Identifiers
- EC no.: 5.3.3.14
- CAS no.: 9030-80-2

Databases
- IntEnz: IntEnz view
- BRENDA: BRENDA entry
- ExPASy: NiceZyme view
- KEGG: KEGG entry
- MetaCyc: metabolic pathway
- PRIAM: profile
- PDB structures: RCSB PDB PDBe PDBsum
Search
- PMC: articles
- PubMed: articles
- NCBI: proteins

In enzymology, a trans-2-decenoyl-[acyl-carrier protein] isomerase (EC 5.3.3.14) is an enzyme that catalyzes the chemical reaction

trans-dec-2-enoyl-[acyl-carrier-protein] $\rightleftharpoons$ cis-dec-3-enoyl-[acyl-carrier-protein]

Hence, this enzyme has one substrate, [[trans-dec-2-enoyl-[acyl-carrier-protein]]], and one product, [[cis-dec-3-enoyl-[acyl-carrier-protein]]].

This enzyme belongs to the family of isomerases, specifically those intramolecular oxidoreductases transposing C=C bonds. The systematic name of this enzyme class is decenoyl-[acyl-carrier-protein] Delta2-trans-Delta3-cis-isomerase. Other names in common use include beta-hydroxydecanoyl thioester dehydrase, trans-2-cis-3-decenoyl-ACP isomerase, trans-2,cis-3-decenoyl-ACP isomerase, trans-2-decenoyl-ACP isomerase, and FabM.
