= Linoleate isomerase =

Enzyme

linoleate isomerase

Identifiers
- EC no.: 5.2.1.5
- CAS no.: 37318-41-5

Databases
- IntEnz: IntEnz view
- BRENDA: BRENDA entry
- ExPASy: NiceZyme view
- KEGG: KEGG entry
- MetaCyc: metabolic pathway
- PRIAM: profile
- PDB structures: RCSB PDB PDBe PDBsum
- Gene Ontology: AmiGO / QuickGO
Search
- PMC: articles
- PubMed: articles
- NCBI: proteins

In enzymology, a linoleate isomerase (EC 5.2.1.5) is an enzyme that catalyzes the chemical reaction

9-cis,12-cis-octadecadienoate $\rightleftharpoons$ 9-cis,11-trans-octadecadienoate

Hence, this enzyme has one substrate, 9-cis,12-cis-octadecadienoate, and one product, 9-cis,11-trans-octadecadienoate.

This enzyme belongs to the family of isomerases, specifically cis-trans isomerases. The systematic name of this enzyme class is linoleate Delta12-cis-Delta11-trans-isomerase. This enzyme is also called linoleic acid isomerase. This enzyme participates in linoleic acid metabolism.
