= GAI (Arabidopsis thaliana gene) =

Gene in Arabidopsis thaliana

GA Insensitive
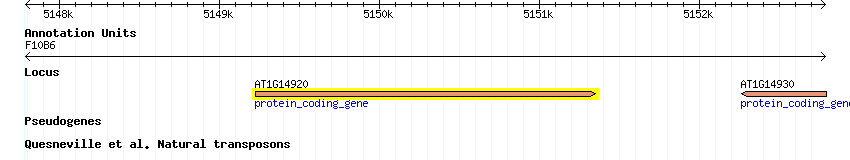
- Gene Model

Identifiers
- Organism: Arabidopsis thaliana
- Symbol: GAI
- Alt. symbols: AT1G14920; F10B6.34; F10B6_34; GA INSENSITIVE; GAI PROTEIN; RESTORATION ON GROWTH ON AMMONIA; RGA2
- Entrez: 838057
- RefSeq (mRNA): NM_101361
- RefSeq (Prot): NP_172945
- UniProt: Q9LQT8
Search for
- Structures: Swiss-model
- Domains: InterPro

Gene ontology
- Molecular Function: • transcription factor activity
- Cellular Component: • nucleus
- Biological Process: • hyperosmotic salinity response • negative regulation of gibberellic acid mediated signaling • negative regulation of seed germination • negative regulation of seed germination

GAI or Gibberellic-Acid Insensitive is a gene in Arabidopsis thaliana which is involved in regulation of plant growth. GAI represses the pathway of gibberellin-sensitive plant growth. It does this by way of its conserved DELLA motif.
