= 2-chloro-4-carboxymethylenebut-2-en-1,4-olide isomerase =

Class of enzymes

Identifiers
- EC no.: 5.2.1.10
- CAS no.: 115629-29-3

Databases
- IntEnz: IntEnz view
- BRENDA: BRENDA entry
- ExPASy: NiceZyme view
- KEGG: KEGG entry
- MetaCyc: metabolic pathway
- PRIAM: profile
- PDB structures: RCSB PDB PDBe PDBsum
- Gene Ontology: AmiGO / QuickGO
Search
- PMC: articles
- PubMed: articles
- NCBI: proteins

In enzymology, a 2-chloro-4-carboxymethylenebut-2-en-1,4-olide isomerase (EC 5.2.1.10) is an enzyme that catalyzes the chemical reaction

cis-2-chloro-4-carboxymethylenebut-2-en-1,4-olide $\rightleftharpoons$ trans-2-chloro-4-carboxymethylenebut-2-en-1,4-olide

Hence, this enzyme has one substrate, cis-2-chloro-4-carboxymethylenebut-2-en-1,4-olide, and one product, trans-2-chloro-4-carboxymethylenebut-2-en-1,4-olide.

This enzyme belongs to the family of isomerases, specifically cis-trans isomerases. The systematic name of this enzyme class is 2-chloro-4-carboxymethylenebut-2-en-1,4-olide cis-trans-isomerase. Other names in common use include 2-chlorocarboxymethylenebutenolide isomerase, and chlorodienelactone isomerase. This enzyme participates in 1,4-dichlorobenzene degradation.
