= (hydroxyamino)benzene mutase =

Class of enzymes

Identifiers
- EC no.: 5.4.4.1

Databases
- IntEnz: IntEnz view
- BRENDA: BRENDA entry
- ExPASy: NiceZyme view
- KEGG: KEGG entry
- MetaCyc: metabolic pathway
- PRIAM: profile
- PDB structures: RCSB PDB PDBe PDBsum
Search
- PMC: articles
- PubMed: articles
- NCBI: proteins

In enzymology, a (hydroxyamino)benzene mutase (EC 5.4.4.1) is an enzyme that catalyzes the chemical reaction

(hydroxyamino)benzene $\rightleftharpoons$ 2-aminophenol

Hence, this enzyme has one substrate, (hydroxyamino)benzene, and one product, 2-aminophenol.

This enzyme belongs to the family of isomerases, specifically those intramolecular transferases transferring hydroxy groups. The systematic name of this enzyme class is (hydroxyamino)benzene hydroxymutase. Other names in common use include HAB mutase, hydroxylaminobenzene hydroxymutase, and hydroxylaminobenzene mutase. This enzyme participates in naphthalene and anthracene degradation.
