= Vinylacetyl-CoA Delta-isomerase =

Vinylacetyl-CoA Δ-isomerase

Identifiers
- EC no.: 5.3.3.3
- CAS no.: 9023-73-8

Databases
- IntEnz: IntEnz view
- BRENDA: BRENDA entry
- ExPASy: NiceZyme view
- KEGG: KEGG entry
- MetaCyc: metabolic pathway
- PRIAM: profile
- PDB structures: RCSB PDB PDBe PDBsum
- Gene Ontology: AmiGO / QuickGO
Search
- PMC: articles
- PubMed: articles
- NCBI: proteins

In enzymology, a vinylacetyl-CoA Delta-isomerase (EC 5.3.3.3) is an enzyme that catalyzes the chemical reaction

vinylacetyl-CoA $\rightleftharpoons$ crotonyl-CoA

Hence, this enzyme has one substrate, vinylacetyl-CoA, and one product, crotonyl-CoA.

This enzyme belongs to the family of isomerases, specifically those intramolecular oxidoreductases transposing C=C bonds. The systematic name of this enzyme class is vinylacetyl-CoA Delta3-Delta2-isomerase. Other names in common use include vinylacetyl coenzyme A Delta-isomerase, vinylacetyl coenzyme A isomerase, and Delta3-cis-Delta2-trans-enoyl-CoA isomerase. This enzyme participates in butanoate metabolism.

== Structural studies ==
As of late 2007, only one structure has been solved for this class of enzymes, with the PDB accession code 1U8V.
