= Alpha-pinene-oxide decyclase =

α-Pinene-oxide decyclase

Identifiers
- EC no.: 5.5.1.10
- CAS no.: 112692-50-9

Databases
- IntEnz: IntEnz view
- BRENDA: BRENDA entry
- ExPASy: NiceZyme view
- KEGG: KEGG entry
- MetaCyc: metabolic pathway
- PRIAM: profile
- PDB structures: RCSB PDB PDBe PDBsum
- Gene Ontology: AmiGO / QuickGO
Search
- PMC: articles
- PubMed: articles
- NCBI: proteins

In enzymology, an α-pinene-oxide decyclase (EC 5.5.1.10) is an enzyme that catalyzes the chemical reaction

α-pinene oxide $\rightleftharpoons$ (Z)-2-methyl-5-isopropylhexa-2,5-dienal

Hence, this enzyme has one substrate, α-pinene oxide, and one product, (Z)-2-methyl-5-isopropylhexa-2,5-dienal.

This enzyme belongs to the family of isomerases, specifically the class of intramolecular lyases. The systematic name of this enzyme class is α-pinene-oxide lyase (decyclizing). This enzyme is also called α-pinene oxide lyase. This enzyme participates in limonene and pinene degradation.
