= Phosphopentomutase =

phosphopentomutase

Identifiers
- EC no.: 5.4.2.7
- CAS no.: 9026-77-1

Databases
- IntEnz: IntEnz view
- BRENDA: BRENDA entry
- ExPASy: NiceZyme view
- KEGG: KEGG entry
- MetaCyc: metabolic pathway
- PRIAM: profile
- PDB structures: RCSB PDB PDBe PDBsum
- Gene Ontology: AmiGO / QuickGO
Search
- PMC: articles
- PubMed: articles
- NCBI: proteins

In enzymology, a phosphopentomutase (EC 5.4.2.7) is an enzyme that catalyzes the chemical reaction

alpha-D-ribose 1-phosphate $\rightleftharpoons$ D-ribose 5-phosphate

Hence, this enzyme has one substrate, alpha-D-ribose 1-phosphate, and one product, D-ribose 5-phosphate.

This enzyme belongs to the family of isomerases, specifically the phosphotransferases (phosphomutases), which transfer phosphate groups within a molecule. The systematic name of this enzyme class is alpha-D-ribose 1,5-phosphomutase. Other names in common use include phosphodeoxyribomutase, deoxyribose phosphomutase, deoxyribomutase, phosphoribomutase, alpha-D-glucose-1,6-bisphosphate:deoxy-D-ribose-1-phosphate, phosphotransferase, and D-ribose 1,5-phosphomutase. This enzyme participates in pentose phosphate pathway and purine metabolism. It has 3 cofactors: D-ribose 1,5-bisphosphate, alpha-D-Glucose 1,6-bisphosphate, and 2-Deoxy-D-ribose 1,5-bisphosphate.

== Structural studies ==
The first published description of a structure of a prokaryotic phosphopentomutase was in 2011. Structures of Bacillus cereus phosphopentomutase as it was purified, after activation, bound to ribose 5-phosphate and bound to glucose 1,6-bisphosphate are deposited in the PDB with accession codes 3M8W, 3M8Y, 3M8Z and 3OT9, respectively.
