= Hydantoin racemase =

Identifiers
- EC no.: 5.1.99.5

Databases
- IntEnz: IntEnz view
- BRENDA: BRENDA entry
- ExPASy: NiceZyme view
- KEGG: KEGG entry
- MetaCyc: metabolic pathway
- PRIAM: profile
- PDB structures: RCSB PDB PDBe PDBsum
Search
- PMC: articles
- PubMed: articles
- NCBI: proteins

Hydantoin racemase (EC 5.1.99.5, 5'-monosubstituted-hydantoin racemase, HyuA, HyuE) is an enzyme with systematic name D-5-monosubstituted-hydantoin racemase. This enzyme catalyses the following chemical reaction

D-5-monosubstituted hydantoin $\rightleftharpoons$ L-5-monosubstituted hydantoin

This enzyme is a part of the reaction cascade known as the "hydantoinase process".
