= Halimadienyl-diphosphate synthase =

Class of enzymes

Identifiers
- EC no.: 5.5.1.16

Databases
- IntEnz: IntEnz view
- BRENDA: BRENDA entry
- ExPASy: NiceZyme view
- KEGG: KEGG entry
- MetaCyc: metabolic pathway
- PRIAM: profile
- PDB structures: RCSB PDB PDBe PDBsum
Search
- PMC: articles
- PubMed: articles
- NCBI: proteins

Halimadienyl-diphosphate synthase (EC 5.5.1.16, Rv3377c, halimadienyl diphosphate synthase, tuberculosinol diphosphate synthase, halima-5(6),13-dien-15-yl-diphosphate lyase (cyclizing)) is an enzyme with systematic name halima-5,13-dien-15-yl-diphosphate lyase (decyclizing). This enzyme catalyses the following chemical reaction

geranylgeranyl diphosphate $\rightleftharpoons$ tuberculosinyl diphosphate

This enzyme requires Mg^{2+} for activity.
