= 3-carboxy-cis,cis-muconate cycloisomerase =

InterPro Family

Identifiers
- EC no.: 5.5.1.2
- CAS no.: 9075-77-8

Databases
- IntEnz: IntEnz view
- BRENDA: BRENDA entry
- ExPASy: NiceZyme view
- KEGG: KEGG entry
- MetaCyc: metabolic pathway
- PRIAM: profile
- PDB structures: RCSB PDB PDBe PDBsum
- Gene Ontology: AmiGO / QuickGO
Search
- PMC: articles
- PubMed: articles
- NCBI: proteins

3-carboxy-cis,cis-muconate cycloisomerase (EC 5.5.1.2) is an enzyme that catalyzes the chemical reaction

2-(carboxymethyl)-5-oxo-2,5-dihydro-2-furoic acid
3-carboxy-cis,cis-muconic acid

The enzyme has one substrate, 2-(carboxymethyl)-5-oxo-2,5-dihydro-2-furoic acid, which is converted to 3-carboxy-cis,cis-muconic acid.

This enzyme belongs to the family of isomerases, specifically intramolecular lyases. The systematic name of this enzyme class is 2-carboxy-2,5-dihydro-5-oxofuran-2-acetate lyase (decyclizing). Other names in common use include beta-carboxymuconate lactonizing enzyme, and 3-carboxymuconolactone hydrolase. This enzyme participates in benzoate degradation via hydroxylation.

== Structural studies ==
As of late 2007, only one structure has been solved for this class of enzymes, with the PDB accession code 1Q5N.
