= Syn-copalyl-diphosphate synthase =

Class of enzymes

Identifiers
- EC no.: 5.5.1.14

Databases
- IntEnz: IntEnz view
- BRENDA: BRENDA entry
- ExPASy: NiceZyme view
- KEGG: KEGG entry
- MetaCyc: metabolic pathway
- PRIAM: profile
- PDB structures: RCSB PDB PDBe PDBsum
Search
- PMC: articles
- PubMed: articles
- NCBI: proteins

Syn-copalyl-diphosphate synthase (EC 5.5.1.14, OsCyc1, OsCPSsyn, syn-CPP synthase, syn-copalyl diphosphate synthase) is an enzyme with systematic name 9alpha-copalyl-diphosphate lyase (decyclizing). This enzyme catalyses the following chemical reaction

geranylgeranyl diphosphate $\rightleftharpoons$ 9alpha-copalyl diphosphate

This enzyme requires a divalent metal ion, preferably Mg^{2+}, for activity.
