= Chloromuconate cycloisomerase =

Enzyme

chloromuconate cycloisomerase
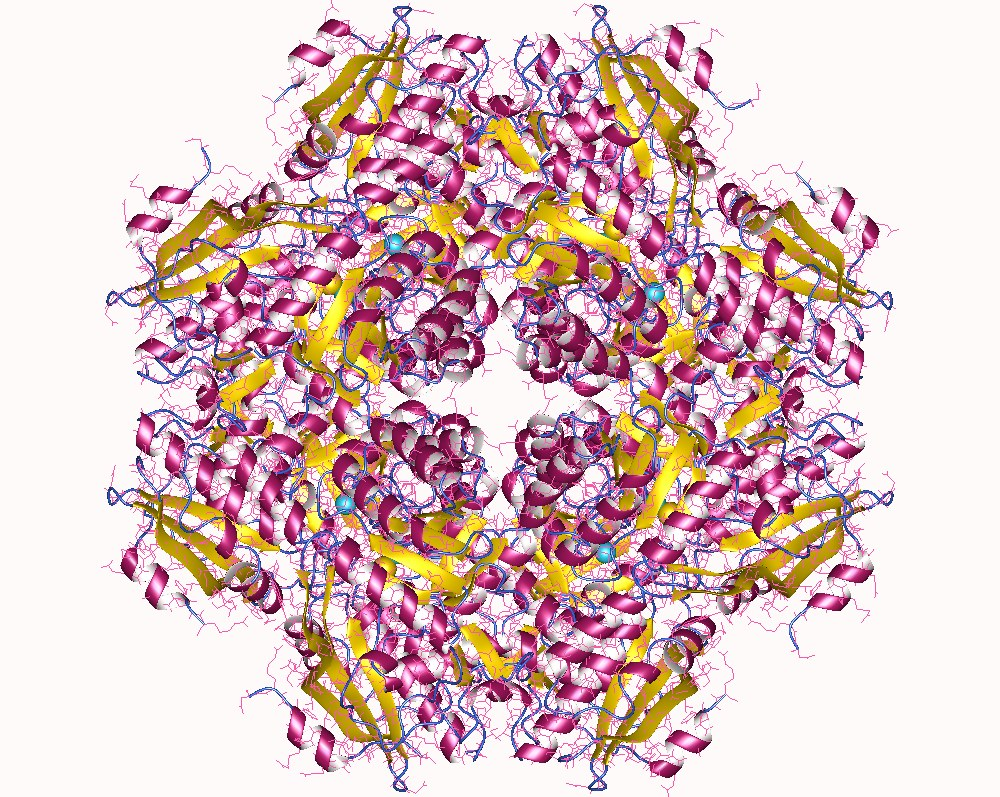
- Chloromuconate cycloisomerase oktamer, Rhodococcus opacus

Identifiers
- EC no.: 5.5.1.7
- CAS no.: 95990-33-3

Databases
- IntEnz: IntEnz view
- BRENDA: BRENDA entry
- ExPASy: NiceZyme view
- KEGG: KEGG entry
- MetaCyc: metabolic pathway
- PRIAM: profile
- PDB structures: RCSB PDB PDBe PDBsum
- Gene Ontology: AmiGO / QuickGO
Search
- PMC: articles
- PubMed: articles
- NCBI: proteins

In enzymology, a chloromuconate cycloisomerase (EC 5.5.1.7) is an enzyme that catalyzes the chemical reaction

2-chloro-2,5-dihydro-5-oxofuran-2-acetate $\rightleftharpoons$ 3-chloro-cis,cis-muconate

Hence, this enzyme has one substrate, 2-chloro-2,5-dihydro-5-oxofuran-2-acetate, and one product, 3-chloro-cis,cis-muconate.

This enzyme belongs to the family of isomerases, specifically the class of intramolecular lyases. The systematic name of this enzyme class is 2-chloro-2,5-dihydro-5-oxofuran-2-acetate lyase (decyclizing). This enzyme is also called muconate cycloisomerase II. This enzyme participates in gamma-hexachlorocyclohexane degradation and 1,4-dichlorobenzene degradation. It employs one cofactor, manganese.

== Structural studies ==
As of late 2007, 3 structures have been solved for this class of enzymes, with PDB accession codes 1CHR, 1NU5, and 2CHR.
