= Ent-kaurene synthase =

ent-kaurene synthase

Identifiers
- EC no.: 4.2.3.19
- CAS no.: 9055-64-5

Databases
- IntEnz: IntEnz view
- BRENDA: BRENDA entry
- ExPASy: NiceZyme view
- KEGG: KEGG entry
- MetaCyc: metabolic pathway
- PRIAM: profile
- PDB structures: RCSB PDB PDBe PDBsum
- Gene Ontology: AmiGO / QuickGO
Search
- PMC: articles
- PubMed: articles
- NCBI: proteins

The enzyme ent-kaurene synthase (EC 4.2.3.19) catalyzes the chemical reaction

ent-copalyl diphosphate $\rightleftharpoons$ ent-kaurene + diphosphate

This enzyme belongs to the family of lyases, specifically those carbon-oxygen lyases acting on phosphates. The systematic name of this enzyme class is ent-copalyl-diphosphate diphosphate-lyase (cyclizing, ent-kaurene-forming). Other names in common use include ent-kaurene synthase B, ent-kaurene synthetase B, ent-copalyl-diphosphate diphosphate-lyase, and (cyclizing). This enzyme participates in diterpenoid biosynthesis.

== In Stevia ==
In Stevia spp., ent-kaurene synthase is a required part of the biosynthesis of steviol. Hajihashemi et al., 2013 find that it is involved in the drought stress response and – because it mimics drought stress – paclobutrazol toxicity. Both inhibit transcription of steviol glycoside synthesis genes including ent-kaurene synthase. This is believed to reduce steviol content in the final plant product.
