= Terpentedienyl-diphosphate synthase =

Type of enzyme

Identifiers
- EC no.: 5.5.1.15

Databases
- IntEnz: IntEnz view
- BRENDA: BRENDA entry
- ExPASy: NiceZyme view
- KEGG: KEGG entry
- MetaCyc: metabolic pathway
- PRIAM: profile
- PDB structures: RCSB PDB PDBe PDBsum
Search
- PMC: articles
- PubMed: articles
- NCBI: proteins

Terpentedienyl-diphosphate synthase (EC 5.5.1.15, terpentedienol diphosphate synthase, Cyc1, clerodadienyl diphosphate synthase) is an enzyme with systematic name terpentedienyl-diphosphate lyase (decyclizing). This enzyme catalyses the following chemical reaction

geranylgeranyl diphosphate $\rightleftharpoons$ terpentedienyl diphosphate

This enzyme requires Mg^{2+}.
