= Tetrahydroxypteridine cycloisomerase =

tetrahydroxypteridine cycloisomerase

Identifiers
- EC no.: 5.5.1.3
- CAS no.: 37318-54-0

Databases
- IntEnz: IntEnz view
- BRENDA: BRENDA entry
- ExPASy: NiceZyme view
- KEGG: KEGG entry
- MetaCyc: metabolic pathway
- PRIAM: profile
- PDB structures: RCSB PDB PDBe PDBsum
- Gene Ontology: AmiGO / QuickGO
Search
- PMC: articles
- PubMed: articles
- NCBI: proteins

In enzymology, a tetrahydroxypteridine cycloisomerase (EC 5.5.1.3) is an enzyme that catalyzes the chemical reaction

tetrahydroxypteridine $\rightleftharpoons$ xanthine-8-carboxylate

Hence, this enzyme has one substrate, tetrahydroxypteridine, and one product, xanthine-8-carboxylate.

This enzyme belongs to the family of isomerases, specifically the class of intramolecular lyases. The systematic name of this enzyme class is tetrahydroxypteridine lyase (isomerizing). It employs one cofactor, NAD+.
