= Dichloromuconate cycloisomerase =

dichloromuconate cycloisomerase

Identifiers
- EC no.: 5.5.1.11
- CAS no.: 126904-95-8

Databases
- IntEnz: IntEnz view
- BRENDA: BRENDA entry
- ExPASy: NiceZyme view
- KEGG: KEGG entry
- MetaCyc: metabolic pathway
- PRIAM: profile
- PDB structures: RCSB PDB PDBe PDBsum
- Gene Ontology: AmiGO / QuickGO
Search
- PMC: articles
- PubMed: articles
- NCBI: proteins

In enzymology, a dichloromuconate cycloisomerase (EC 5.5.1.11) is an enzyme that catalyzes the chemical reaction

2,4-dichloro-2,5-dihydro-5-oxofuran-2-acetate $\rightleftharpoons$ 2,4-dichloro-cis,cis-muconate

Hence, this enzyme has one substrate, 2,4-dichloro-2,5-dihydro-5-oxofuran-2-acetate, and one product, 2,4-dichloro-cis,cis-muconate.

This enzyme belongs to the family of isomerases, specifically the class of intramolecular lyases. The systematic name of this enzyme class is 2,4-dichloro-2,5-dihydro-5-oxofuran-2-acetate lyase (decyclizing). This enzyme participates in 1,4-dichlorobenzene degradation. It employs one cofactor, manganese.
