= Prosolanapyrone-II oxidase =

Identifiers
- EC no.: 1.1.3.42

Databases
- IntEnz: IntEnz view
- BRENDA: BRENDA entry
- ExPASy: NiceZyme view
- KEGG: KEGG entry
- MetaCyc: metabolic pathway
- PRIAM: profile
- PDB structures: RCSB PDB PDBe PDBsum
Search
- PMC: articles
- PubMed: articles
- NCBI: proteins

Prosolanapyrone-II oxidase (EC 1.1.3.42, Sol5, SPS, solanapyrone synthase (bifunctional enzyme: prosolanapyrone II oxidase/prosolanapyrone III cycloisomerase), prosolanapyrone II oxidase) is an enzyme with systematic name prosolanapyrone-II:oxygen 3'-oxidoreductase. This enzyme catalyses the following chemical reaction

prosolanapyrone II + O_{2} $\rightleftharpoons$ prosolanapyrone III + H_{2}O_{2}

This enzyme participates in the biosynthesis of the phytotoxin solanapyrone by some fungi.
