= (S)-beta-macrocarpene synthase =

Class of enzymes

(S)-β-Macrocarpene synthase

Identifiers
- EC no.: 5.5.1.17

Databases
- IntEnz: IntEnz view
- BRENDA: BRENDA entry
- ExPASy: NiceZyme view
- KEGG: KEGG entry
- MetaCyc: metabolic pathway
- PRIAM: profile
- PDB structures: RCSB PDB PDBe PDBsum
Search
- PMC: articles
- PubMed: articles
- NCBI: proteins

(S)-β-macrocarpene synthase (EC 5.5.1.17, TPS6, TPS11) is an enzyme with systematic name (S)-β-macrocarpene lyase (decyclizing). This enzyme catalyses the following chemical reaction

(S)-β-bisabolene $\rightleftharpoons$ (S)-β-macrocarpene

The synthesis of (S)-beta-macrocarpene from (2E,6E)-farnesyl diphosphate proceeds in two steps.
