= Kaurenoic acid =

- Kaurenoic acid

Names
- IUPAC name 5β,8α,9β,10α,13α-Kaur-16-en-18-oic acid
- Systematic IUPAC name (4R,4aS,6aS,9R,11aR,11bS)-4,11b-Dimethyl-8-methylidenetetradecahydro-6a,9-methanocyclohepta[a]naphthalene-4-carboxylic acid
- Other names: Cunabic acid; Kaurenic acid

Identifiers
CAS Number	6730-83-2
3D model (JSmol)	Interactive image
Beilstein Reference	10784819
ChEBI	CHEBI:15417
ChEMBL	ChEMBL489140
ChemSpider	21258059
KEGG	C11874
PubChem CID	73062
UNII	D572D9R2TZ
- InChI: InChI=1S/C20H30O2/c1-13-11-20-10-7-15-18(2,16(20)6-5-14(13)12-20)8-4-9-19(15,3)17(21)22/h14-16H,1,4-12H2,2-3H3,(H,21,22)/t14-,15+,16+,18-,19-,20-/m1/s1 Key: NIKHGUQULKYIGE-OTCXFQBHSA-N
- SMILES: C=C1C[C@@]23CC[C@]4([H])[C@@](C(O)=O)(C)CCC[C@@]4(C)[C@]2([H])CC[C@@H]1C3

Properties
Chemical formula	C_{20}H_{30}O_{2}
Molar mass	302.458 g·mol^{−1}

Pharmacology
ATC code	M09AX05 (WHO)
- Except where otherwise noted, data are given for materials in their standard state (at 25 °C [77 °F], 100 kPa). Infobox references

Kaurenoic acid (ent-kaur-16-en-19-oic acid or kauren-19-oic acid) is a diterpene with antibacterial activity against Gram-positive bacteria. However its low solubility and blood lytic activity on erythrocytes might make it a poor pharmaceutical candidate. Kaurenoic acid also has uterine relaxant activity via calcium blockade and opening ATP-sensitive potassium channels.

Kaurenoic acid is found in several plants such as Copaifera. It is a potential biomarker for the presence of sunflower in foods.

== Medical use ==
Kaurenoic acid has been studied for its medicinal properties and seems to have anti-inflammatory, antiulcerogenic, antitumor, antinociceptive, antimelanoma, antitilipoperoxidation, antioxidant and antimicrobial properties.

Kaurenoic acid decreases leukocyte migration. It seems to inhibit histamine and serotonin pathways, in addition to antiprotozoal activities against Trypanosoma cruzi and Leishmania amazonensis.
