= Prosolanapyrone-III cycloisomerase =

Identifiers
- EC no.: 5.5.1.20

Databases
- IntEnz: IntEnz view
- BRENDA: BRENDA entry
- ExPASy: NiceZyme view
- KEGG: KEGG entry
- MetaCyc: metabolic pathway
- PRIAM: profile
- PDB structures: RCSB PDB PDBe PDBsum
Search
- PMC: articles
- PubMed: articles
- NCBI: proteins

Prosolanapyrone-III cycloisomerase (EC 5.5.1.20, Sol5, SPS, solanapyrone synthase (bifunctional enzyme: prosolanapyrone II oxidase/prosolanapyrone III cyclosiomerase)) is an enzyme with systematic name prosolanapyrone-III:(-)-solanapyrone A isomerase. This enzyme catalyses the following chemical reaction

prosolanapyrone III $\rightleftharpoons$ (-)-solanapyrone A

The enzyme is involved in the biosynthesis of the phytotoxin solanapyrone in some fungi.
