= Ent-kaurene oxidase =

Identifiers
- EC no.: 1.14.14.86
- CAS no.: 149565-67-3

Databases
- IntEnz: IntEnz view
- BRENDA: BRENDA entry
- ExPASy: NiceZyme view
- KEGG: KEGG entry
- MetaCyc: metabolic pathway
- PRIAM: profile
- PDB structures: RCSB PDB PDBe PDBsum
Search
- PMC: articles
- PubMed: articles
- NCBI: proteins

Ent-kaurene oxidase (EC 1.14.14.86, Formerly EC 1.14.13.78) is an enzyme with systematic name ent-kaur-16-ene,NADPH:oxygen oxidoreductase (hydroxylating). This enzyme catalyses the following chemical reaction

ent-kaur-16-ene + 3 NADPH + 3 H^{+} + 3 O_{2} $\rightleftharpoons$ ent-kaur-16-en-19-oate + 3 NADP^{+} + 4 H_{2}O (overall reaction)
(1a) ent-kaur-16-ene + NADPH + H^{+} + O_{2} $\rightleftharpoons$ ent-kaur-16-en-19-ol + NADP^{+} + H_{2}O
(1b) ent-kaur-16-en-19-ol + NADPH + H^{+} + O_{2} $\rightleftharpoons$ ent-kaur-16-en-19-al + NADP^{+} + 2 H_{2}O
(1c) ent-kaur-16-en-19-al + NADPH + O_{2} $\rightleftharpoons$ ent-kaur-16-en-19-oate + NADP^{+} + H_{2}O

Ent-kaurene oxidase is a cytochrome p450 class enzyme.
