= Pinkert =

Pinkert is a German language occupational surname for a blacksmith which is also to be found among Ashkenazi Jews and may refer to:

- Regina Pinkert (1869–1931), Polish opera singer and soprano
- Dean A. Pinkert (born 1956), American trade lawyer

== See also ==
- Pinker
- Pink (surname)
