= March 6 =

March 6 this year in various calendars
- Friday, 6 March 2026
Akan	Fofie
Armenian	19 Areg 1475
Aztec	Tecuilhuitontli 15, 4 Calli
Babylonian	16 Shabatu, 2336 SE
Balinese pawukon	Luang, Pepet, Pasah, Jaya, Paing, Tungleh, Sukra of Ugu, Guru, Urungan, Manuh
Bengali	21 Falgun, BS 1432
Chinese	Yin Earth Rabbit・Neck Mansion; Fire Horse Year, Month 1, Day 18 (Jingzhe, 14 days until Chunfen)
Common Era	6 March 2026 CE
Coptic	27 Meshir, AM 1742
Egyptian	24 Epiphi, 2774 NE
Ethiopian	27 Yakātit, 2018 Amätä Məhrät
French Republican	Décade II, Sextidi de Ventôse de l'Année 234 de la République
Gregorian	6 March, AD 2026
Hebrew	17 Adar, AM 5786
Hindu	Hasta・Gaṇḍa; Solar: 22 Phālguna, 1947 SE; Lunisolar: Tr̥tīyā, Kṛishna pakṣa of Phālguna, 2082 VE; Rāudra・5126 KY・1,872,640
Icelandic	Föstudagur, 13 Góa 2025
Islamic	17 Ramadan, AH 1447 (using tabular method)
ISO week date	2026-W10-5
Japanese	18 Mutsuki, Reiwa 8 (Keichitsu, 14 days until Shunbun)
Julian	21 February, AD 2026 (AM 7534)
Julian day	2461106
Korean	18 Horangidal, 4359 DE
Maya	13.0.13.7.3; 1 Cumku, 4 Akbal
Roman	ante diem IX Kalendas Martias, MMDCCLXXIX AUC
Solar Hijri	15 Esfand, SH 1404
Tibetan	18 mchu, me pho rta 2153 or 1772 or 1000

<<	March					>>
Su	Mo	Tu	We	Th	Fr	Sa
1	2	3	4	5	6	7
8	9	10	11	12	13	14
15	16	17	18	19	20	21
22	23	24	25	26	27	28
29	30	31
2026

March 6 in recent years
2026 (Friday)
2025 (Thursday)
2024 (Wednesday)
2023 (Monday)
2022 (Sunday)
2021 (Saturday)
2020 (Friday)
2019 (Wednesday)
2018 (Tuesday)
2017 (Monday)

March 6 is the 65th day of the year (66th in leap years) in the Gregorian calendar; 300 days remain until the end of the year.

== Events ==
=== Pre-1600 ===
- 12 BCE – The Roman emperor Augustus is named Pontifex Maximus, incorporating the position into that of the emperor.
- 845 – The 42 Martyrs of Amorium are killed after refusing to convert to Islam.
- 1204 – The Siege of Château Gaillard ends in a French victory over King John of England, who loses control of Normandy to King Philip II Augustus.
- 1323 – Treaty of Paris of 1323 is signed.
- 1447 – Election of Pope Nicholas V following the death of Pope Eugene IV on 23 February 1447.

=== 1601–1900 ===
- 1651 – The town of Kajaani, known at the time as Cajanaburg, is founded by Count Per Brahe, the Governor-General of Finland.
- 1788 – The First Fleet arrives at Norfolk Island in order to found a convict settlement.
- 1820 – The Missouri Compromise is signed into law by United States President James Monroe. The compromise allows Missouri to enter the Union as a slave state, brings Maine into the Union as a free state, and makes the rest of the northern part of the Louisiana Purchase territory slavery-free.
- 1836 – Texas Revolution: Battle of the Alamo: After a thirteen-day siege by an army of over 1,800 Mexican troops, the 257 Texas volunteers, including frontiersman Davy Crockett and colonel Jim Bowie, defending the Alamo are killed and the fort is captured.
- 1857 – The Supreme Court of the United States rules 7–2 in the Dred Scott v. Sandford case that the Constitution does not confer citizenship on black people.

=== 1901–present ===
- 1901 – An anarchist assassin tries to kill German Emperor Wilhelm II.
- 1904 – Scottish National Antarctic Expedition: Led by William Speirs Bruce, the Antarctic region of Coats Land is discovered from the Scotia.
- 1930 – International Unemployment Day demonstrations globally initiated by the Communist Party USA.
- 1943 – World War II: Generalfeldmarschall Erwin Rommel launches the Battle of Medenine in an attempt to slow down the British Eighth Army. It fails, and he leaves Africa three days later.
- 1943 – World War II: The Battle of Fardykambos, one of the first major battles between the Greek Resistance and the occupying Royal Italian Army, ends with the surrender of an entire Italian battalion, the bulk of the garrison of the town of Grevena, leading to its liberation a fortnight later.
- 1945 – World War II: Cologne is captured by American troops. On the same day, Operation Spring Awakening, the last major German offensive of the war, begins.
- 1957 – the Ghana Independence Act 1957 is passed in the United Kingdom resulting in Ghana gaining independence from the British.
- 1975 – Algiers Accord: Iran and Iraq announce a settlement of their border dispute.
- 1985 – Registration of the Filipino megachurch Christ's Commission Fellowship with the Philippine government, months after its first worship service in August 1984.
- 1987 – The British ferry Herald of Free Enterprise capsizes in about 90 seconds, killing 193.
- 1988 – Operation Flavius: Three Provisional Irish Republican Army volunteers are shot dead by the SAS in Gibraltar.
- 2003 – Air Algérie Flight 6289 crashes at the Aguenar – Hadj Bey Akhamok Airport in Tamanrasset, Algeria, killing 102 out of the 103 people on board.
- 2008 – A suicide bomber kills 68 people in the Karrada district of Karrada in Baghdad
- 2008 – A gunman kills eight students in Jerusalem.
- 2020 – 32 people are killed and 82 are injured when gunmen open fire on a ceremony in Kabul, Afghanistan. The Islamic State claims responsibility for the attack.

== Births ==
=== Pre-1600 ===
- 1340 – John of Gaunt (probable; d. 1399)
- 1405 – John II of Castile (died 1454)
- 1475 – Michelangelo, Italian painter and sculptor (died 1564)
- 1483 – Francesco Guicciardini, Italian historian and politician (died 1540)
- 1495 – Luigi Alamanni, Italian poet and diplomat (died 1556)

=== 1601–1900 ===
- 1619 – Cyrano de Bergerac, French author and playwright (died 1655)
- 1663 – Francis Atterbury, English bishop (died 1732)
- 1716 – Pehr Kalm, Swedish-Finnish botanist and explorer (died 1779)
- 1724 – Henry Laurens, English-American merchant and politician, 5th President of the Continental Congress (died 1792)
- 1761 – Antoine-François Andréossy, French general and diplomat (died 1828)
- 1779 – Antoine-Henri Jomini, Swiss-French general (died 1869)
- 1780 – Lucy Barnes, American writer (died 1809)
- 1785 – Karol Kurpiński, Polish composer and conductor (died 1857)
- 1787 – Joseph von Fraunhofer, German physicist and astronomer (died 1826)
- 1806 – Elizabeth Barrett Browning, English-Italian poet and translator (died 1861)
- 1818 – William Claflin, American businessman and politician, 27th Governor of Massachusetts (died 1905)
- 1823 – Charles I of Württemberg (died 1891)
- 1826 – Annie Feray Mutrie, British painter (died 1893)
- 1831 – Philip Sheridan, Irish-American general (died 1888)
- 1834 – George du Maurier, French-English author and illustrator (died 1896)
- 1841 – Viktor Burenin, Russian author, poet, playwright, and critic (died 1926)
- 1849 – Georg Luger, Austrian gun designer, designed the Luger pistol (died 1923)
- 1865 – Duan Qirui, Chinese warlord and politician (died 1936)
- 1870 – Oscar Straus, Viennese composer and conductor (died 1954)
- 1871 – Afonso Costa, Portuguese lawyer and politician, 59th Prime Minister of Portugal (died 1937)
- 1872 – Sarah Roberts, subject of a vampire legend (died 1913)
- 1876 – A. A. Kannisto, Finnish politician (died 1930)
- 1877 – Rose Fyleman, English writer and poet (died 1957)
- 1882 – F. Burrall Hoffman, American architect, co-designed Villa Vizcaya (died 1980)
- 1882 – Guy Kibbee, American actor and singer (died 1956)
- 1884 – Molla Mallory, Norwegian-American tennis player (died 1959)
- 1884 – María Collazo, Uruguayan journalist and activist (died 1942)
- 1885 – Ring Lardner, American journalist and author (died 1933)
- 1892 – Bert Smith, English international footballer (died 1969)
- 1893 – Furry Lewis, American singer-songwriter and guitarist (died 1981)
- 1893 – Ella P. Stewart, pioneering Black American pharmacist (died 1987)
- 1895 – Albert Tessier, Canadian priest and historian (died 1976)
- 1900 – Gina Cigna, French-Italian soprano and actress (died 2001)
- 1900 – Lefty Grove, American baseball player (died 1975)
- 1900 – Henri Jeanson, French journalist and author (died 1970)

=== 1901–present ===
- 1903 – Empress Nagako of Japan (died 2000)
- 1904 – José Antonio Aguirre, Spanish lawyer and politician, 1st President of the Basque Country (died 1960)
- 1905 – Bob Wills, American Western swing musician, songwriter, and bandleader (died 1975)
- 1906 – Lou Costello, American actor and comedian (died 1959)
- 1909 – Obafemi Awolowo, Nigerian lawyer and politician (died 1987)
- 1909 – Herman Lay, American businessman (died 1982)
- 1909 – Stanisław Jerzy Lec, Polish poet and author (died 1966)
- 1910 – Emma Bailey, American auctioneer and author (died 1999)
- 1912 – Mohammed Burhanuddin, Indian spiritual leader, 52nd Da'i al-Mutlaq (died 2014)
- 1917 – Donald Davidson, American philosopher and academic (died 2003)
- 1917 – Will Eisner, American illustrator and publisher (died 2005)
- 1918 – Howard McGhee, American trumpeter (died 1987)
- 1920 – Lewis Gilbert, English director, producer, and screenwriter (died 2018)
- 1923 – Ed McMahon, American comedian, game show host, and announcer (died 2009)
- 1923 – Wes Montgomery, American guitarist and songwriter (died 1968)
- 1924 – Sarah Caldwell, American opera director, impresario, and stage director (died 2006)
- 1924 – Ottmar Walter, German footballer (died 2013)
- 1924 – William H. Webster, American lawyer and jurist, Director of Central Intelligence (died 2025)
- 1926 – Ann Curtis, American swimmer (died 2012)
- 1926 – Alan Greenspan, American economist and politician (died 2026)
- 1926 – Ray O'Connor, Australian politician, 22nd Premier of Western Australia (died 2013)
- 1926 – Andrzej Wajda, Polish director, producer, and screenwriter (died 2016)
- 1927 – Gordon Cooper, American engineer, pilot, and astronaut (died 2004)
- 1927 – Gabriel García Márquez, Colombian journalist and author, Nobel Prize laureate (died 2014)
- 1929 – Tom Foley, American lawyer and politician, 57th Speaker of the United States House of Representatives (died 2013)
- 1929 – David Sheppard, English cricketer and bishop (died 2005)
- 1930 – Lorin Maazel, French-American violinist, composer, and conductor (died 2014)
- 1932 – Marc Bazin, Haitian lawyer and politician, 49th President of Haiti (died 2010)
- 1932 – Jean Boht, English actress (died 2023)
- 1932 – Bronisław Geremek, Polish historian and politician, Polish Minister of Foreign Affairs (died 2008)
- 1932 – Timofei Moșneaga, Moldovan physician and politician, Moldovan Minister of Health (died 2014)
- 1936 – Marion Barry, American lawyer and politician, 2nd Mayor of the District of Columbia (died 2014)
- 1936 – Choummaly Sayasone, Laotian politician, 5th President of Laos
- 1937 – Ivan Boesky, American businessman (died 2024)
- 1937 – Norman Coburn, Australian actor
- 1937 – Valentina Tereshkova, Russian general, pilot, and astronaut
- 1938 – Keishu Tanaka, Japanese politician, 17th Japanese Minister of Justice (died 2022)
- 1939 – Kit Bond, American lawyer and politician, 47th Governor of Missouri (died 2025)
- 1939 – Adam Osborne, Thai-Indian engineer and businessman, founded the Osborne Computer Corporation (died 2003)
- 1939 – Cookie Rojas, Cuban-American baseball player
- 1940 – Ken Danby, Canadian painter (died 2007)
- 1940 – R. H. Sikes, American golfer (died 2023)
- 1940 – Willie Stargell, American baseball player (died 2001)
- 1941 – Peter Brötzmann, German saxophonist and clarinet player (died 2023)
- 1944 – Richard Corliss, American journalist and critic (died 2015)
- 1944 – Kiri Te Kanawa, New Zealand soprano and actress
- 1944 – Mary Wilson, American singer (died 2021)
- 1945 – Angelo Castro Jr., Filipino actor and journalist (died 2012)
- 1946 – Patrick Baudry, French military officer and astronaut
- 1946 – Martin Kove, American actor
- 1946 – David Gilmour, English guitarist and singer-songwriter
- 1947 – Rob Reiner, American actor, director, producer, and activist (died 2025)
- 1947 – Jean Seaton, English historian and academic
- 1947 – Dick Fosbury, American high jumper (died 2023)
- 1948 – Stephen Schwartz, American composer and producer
- 1949 – Shaukat Aziz, Pakistani economist and politician, 15th Prime Minister of Pakistan
- 1949 – Martin Buchan, Scottish footballer and manager
- 1950 – Arthur Roche, English archbishop
- 1951 – Gerrie Knetemann, Dutch cyclist (died 2004)
- 1952 – Denis Napthine, Australian politician, 47th Premier of Victoria
- 1953 – Madhav Kumar Nepal, Nepali banker and politician, 34th Prime Minister of Nepal
- 1953 – Carolyn Porco, American astronomer and academic
- 1954 – Harald Schumacher, German footballer and manager
- 1955 – Cyprien Ntaryamira, Burundian politician, 5th President of Burundi (died 1994)
- 1955 – Alberta Watson, Canadian actress (died 2015)
- 1956 – Steve Vizard, Australian television host, actor, and producer
- 1959 – Tom Arnold, American actor and comedian
- 1960 – Sleepy Floyd, American basketball player and coach
- 1962 – Alison Nicholas, British golfer
- 1963 – D. L. Hughley, American actor, producer, and screenwriter
- 1964 – Linda Pearson, Scottish sport shooter
- 1966 – Alan Davies, English comedian, actor and screenwriter
- 1967 – Julio Bocca, Argentine ballet dancer and director
- 1967 – Glenn Greenwald, American journalist and author
- 1967 – Connie Britton, American actress
- 1968 – Carla McGhee, American basketball player and coach
- 1971 – Darrick Martin, American basketball player and coach
- 1972 – Shaquille O'Neal, American basketball player
- 1973 – Michael Finley, American basketball player
- 1973 – Peter Lindgren, Swedish guitarist and songwriter
- 1973 – Greg Ostertag, American basketball player
- 1974 – Guy Garvey, English singer-songwriter and guitarist
- 1975 – Aracely Arámbula, Mexican actress and singer
- 1975 – Yannick Nézet-Séguin, Canadian pianist and conductor
- 1976 – Ken Anderson, American wrestler and actor
- 1977 – Nantie Hayward, South African cricketer
- 1977 – Giorgos Karagounis, Greek footballer
- 1977 – Shabani Nonda, Congolese footballer
- 1979 – Tim Howard, American soccer player
- 1979 – Garry Monk, English footballer and manager
- 1980 – Emílson Cribari, Brazilian footballer
- 1983 – Andranik Teymourian, Armenian-Iranian footballer
- 1984 – Daniël de Ridder, Dutch footballer
- 1985 – Pierre-Édouard Bellemare, French ice hockey player
- 1985 – Bakaye Traoré, French-Malian footballer
- 1985 – Daniel Winnik, Canadian ice hockey player
- 1986 – Jake Arrieta, American baseball player
- 1986 – Francisco Cervelli, Venezuelan-Italian baseball player
- 1986 – Timothy DeLaGhetto, American Internet personality
- 1986 – Charlie Mulgrew, Scottish footballer
- 1987 – Mário Bližňák, Slovak ice hockey player
- 1987 – Kevin-Prince Boateng, Ghanaian-German footballer
- 1987 – Chico Flores, Spanish footballer
- 1988 – Agnes, Swedish singer
- 1988 – Marina Erakovic, New Zealand tennis player
- 1988 – Leonys Martín, Cuban-American baseball player
- 1988 – Simon Mignolet, Belgian footballer
- 1989 – Dwight Buycks, American basketball player
- 1989 – Ray Chen, Taiwanese-Australian violinist
- 1989 – Agnieszka Radwańska, Polish tennis player
- 1990 – Derek Drouin, Canadian high jumper
- 1991 – John Jenkins, American basketball player
- 1991 – Tyler, the Creator, American rapper
- 1993 – Nicklas Jensen, Danish ice hockey player
- 1993 – Andrés Rentería, Colombian footballer
- 1994 – Marcus Smart, American basketball player
- 1995 – Josh Hart, American basketball player
- 1995 – Georgi Kitanov, Bulgarian footballer
- 1996 – Christian Coleman, American sprinter
- 1996 – Mohamed Magdy, Egyptian footballer
- 1996 – Timo Werner, German footballer
- 1997 – Lee Lu-da, South Korean singer and actress
- 1997 – Alisha Boe, Norwegian actress
- 1998 – Kyle Trask, American football player
- 1999 – Ylena In-Albon, Swiss tennis player
- 2000 – Armando Bacot, American basketball player
- 2000 – Jacob Bertrand, American actor
- 2001 – Milo Manheim, American actor
- 2003 – Millicent Simmonds, American actress

== Deaths ==
=== Pre-1600 ===
- 190 – Liu Bian (poisoned by Dong Zhuo) (born 176)
- 653 – Li Ke, prince of the Tang Dynasty (born 619)
- 766 – Chrodegang, Frankish bishop and saint
- 903 – Lu Guangqi, Chinese official and chancellor
- 903 – Su Jian, Chinese official and chancellor
- 1070 – Ulric I, Margrave of Carniola
- 1251 – Rose of Viterbo, Italian saint (born 1235)
- 1353 – Roger Grey, 1st Baron Grey de Ruthyn
- 1447 – Colette of Corbie, French abbess and saint in the Catholic Church (born 1381)
- 1466 – Alvise Loredan, Venetian admiral and statesman (born 1393)
- 1490 – Ivan the Young, Ruler of Tver (born 1458)
- 1491 – Richard Woodville, 3rd Earl Rivers
- 1531 – Pedro Arias Dávila, Spanish explorer and diplomat (born 1440)

=== 1601–1900 ===
- 1616 – Francis Beaumont, English playwright (born 1584)
- 1754 – Henry Pelham, English politician, Prime Minister of the United Kingdom (born 1694)
- 1758 – Henry Vane, 1st Earl of Darlington, English politician, Lord Lieutenant of Durham (born 1705)
- 1764 – Philip Yorke, 1st Earl of Hardwicke, English lawyer and politician, Lord Chancellor of the United Kingdom (born 1690)
- 1796 – Guillaume Thomas François Raynal, French historian and author (born 1713)
- 1836 – Deaths at the Battle of the Alamo:
  - James Bonham, American lawyer and soldier (born 1807)
  - James Bowie, American colonel (born 1796)
  - Davy Crockett, American soldier and politician (born 1786)
  - William B. Travis, American lieutenant colonel and lawyer (born 1809)
- 1854 – Charles Vane, 3rd Marquess of Londonderry, Irish colonel and diplomat, Under-Secretary of State for War and the Colonies (born 1778)
- 1866 – William Whewell, English priest, historian, and philosopher (born 1794)
- 1867 – Charles Farrar Browne, American-English author and educator (born 1834)
- 1888 – Louisa May Alcott, American novelist and poet (born 1832)
- 1895 – Camilla Collett, Norwegian novelist and activist (born 1813)
- 1899 – Kaʻiulani of Hawaii (born 1875)
- 1900 – Gottlieb Daimler, German engineer and businessman, co-founded Daimler-Motoren-Gesellschaft (born 1834)

=== 1901–present ===
- 1905 – John Henninger Reagan, American surveyor, judge, and politician, 3rd Confederate States of America Secretary of the Treasury (born 1818)
- 1905 – Makar Yekmalyan, Armenian composer (born 1856)
- 1919 – Oskars Kalpaks, Latvian colonel (born 1882)
- 1920 – Ömer Seyfettin, Turkish author and educator (born 1884)
- 1932 – John Philip Sousa, American conductor and composer (born 1854)
- 1933 – Anton Cermak, Czech-American lawyer and politician, 44th Mayor of Chicago (born 1873)
- 1935 – Oliver Wendell Holmes Jr., American colonel, lawyer, and jurist, Associate Justice of the Supreme Court of the United States (born 1841)
- 1939 – Ferdinand von Lindemann, German mathematician and academic (born 1852)
- 1941 – Francis Aveling, Canadian priest, psychologist, and author (born 1875)
- 1941 – Gutzon Borglum, American sculptor and academic, designed Mount Rushmore (born 1867)
- 1948 – Ross Lockridge Jr., American author, poet, and academic (born 1914)
- 1948 – Alice Woodby McKane, First Black woman doctor in Savannah, Georgia (born 1865)
- 1950 – Albert François Lebrun, French engineer and politician, 15th President of France (born 1871)
- 1951 – Ivor Novello, Welsh singer-songwriter and actor (born 1893)
- 1951 – Volodymyr Vynnychenko, Ukrainian playwright and politician, Prime Minister of Ukraine (born 1880)
- 1952 – Jürgen Stroop, German SS general, and executed war criminal (born 1895)
- 1954 – Charles Edward, Duke of Saxe-Coburg and Gotha, British-born German nobleman and Nazi politician (born 1884)
- 1955 – Mammad Amin Rasulzade, Azerbaijani scholar and politician (born 1884)
- 1961 – George Formby, English singer-songwriter and actor (born 1904)
- 1964 – Paul of Greece (born 1901)
- 1965 – Margaret Dumont, American actress (born 1889)
- 1967 – John Haden Badley, English author and educator, founded the Bedales School (born 1865)
- 1967 – Nelson Eddy, American actor and singer (born 1901)
- 1967 – Zoltán Kodály, Hungarian composer, linguist, and philosopher (born 1882)
- 1970 – William Hopper, American actor (born 1915)
- 1973 – Pearl S. Buck, American novelist, essayist, short story writer, Nobel Prize laureate (born 1892)
- 1974 – Ernest Becker, American anthropologist and author (born 1924)
- 1976 – Maxie Rosenbloom, American boxer (born 1903)
- 1977 – Alvin R. Dyer, American religious leader (born 1903)
- 1981 – George Geary, English cricketer and coach (born 1893)
- 1981 – Rambhau Mhalgi, Indian politician and member of the Lok Sabha (born 1921)
- 1982 – Ayn Rand, Russian-American philosopher, author, and playwright (born 1905)
- 1984 – Billy Collins Jr., American boxer (born 1961)
- 1984 – Martin Niemöller, German pastor and theologian (born 1892)
- 1984 – Homer N. Wallin, American admiral (born 1893)
- 1984 – Henry Wilcoxon, Dominican-American actor and producer (born 1905)
- 1986 – Georgia O'Keeffe, American painter (born 1887)
- 1988 – Mairéad Farrell, Provisional IRA volunteer (born 1957)
- 1988 – Daniel McCann, Provisional IRA volunteer (born 1957)
- 1988 – Seán Savage, Provisional IRA volunteer (born 1965)
- 1994 – Melina Mercouri, Greek actress and politician, 9th Greek Minister of Culture (born 1920)
- 1997 – Cheddi Jagan, Guyanese politician, 4th President of Guyana (born 1918)
- 1997 – Michael Manley, Jamaican soldier, pilot, and politician, 4th Prime Minister of Jamaica (born 1924)
- 1997 – Ursula Torday, English author (born 1912)
- 1999 – Isa bin Salman Al Khalifa, Bahrain king (born 1933)
- 2000 – John Colicos, Canadian actor (born 1928)
- 2002 – Bryan Fogarty, Canadian ice hockey player (born 1969)
- 2004 – Hercules, American wrestler (born 1957)
- 2004 – Frances Dee, American actress (born 1909)
- 2005 – Hans Bethe, German-American physicist and academic, Nobel Prize laureate (born 1906)
- 2005 – Danny Gardella, American baseball player and trainer (born 1920)
- 2005 – Tommy Vance, English radio host (born 1943)
- 2005 – Teresa Wright, American actress (born 1918)
- 2005 – Gladys Marín, Chilean activist and political figure (born 1938)
- 2006 – Anne Braden, American journalist and activist (born 1924)
- 2006 – Kirby Puckett, American baseball player and sportscaster (born 1960)
- 2006 – Ali Farka Touré, Malian singer-songwriter and guitarist (born 1939)
- 2007 – Jean Baudrillard, French photographer and theorist (born 1929)
- 2007 – Ernest Gallo, American businessman, co-founded E & J Gallo Winery (born 1909)
- 2008 – Peter Poreku Dery, Ghanaian cardinal (born 1918)
- 2009 – Francis Magalona, Filipino rapper, producer, and actor (born 1964)
- 2010 – Endurance Idahor, Nigerian footballer (born 1984)
- 2010 – Mark Linkous, American singer-songwriter, guitarist, and producer (born 1962)
- 2010 – Betty Millard, American philanthropist and activist (born 1911)
- 2011 – Sasao Gouland, governor of Chuuk State, Micronesia (born 1933)
- 2012 – Francisco Xavier do Amaral, East Timorese politician, 1st President of East Timor (born 1937)
- 2012 – Donald M. Payne, American businessman and politician (born 1934)
- 2012 – Helen Walulik, American baseball player (born 1929)
- 2013 – Chorão, Brazilian singer-songwriter (born 1970)
- 2013 – Stompin' Tom Connors, Canadian singer-songwriter and guitarist (born 1936)
- 2013 – Alvin Lee, English singer-songwriter and guitarist (born 1944)
- 2013 – W. Wallace Cleland, American biochemist and academic (born 1930)
- 2014 – Alemayehu Atomsa, Ethiopian educator and politician (born 1969)
- 2014 – Frank Jobe, American soldier and surgeon (born 1925)
- 2014 – Sheila MacRae, English-American actress, singer, and dancer (born 1921)
- 2014 – Martin Nesbitt, American lawyer and politician (born 1946)
- 2014 – Manlio Sgalambro, Italian philosopher, author, and poet (born 1924)
- 2015 – Fred Craddock, American minister and academic (born 1928)
- 2015 – Ram Sundar Das, Indian lawyer and politician, 18th Chief Minister of Bihar (born 1921)
- 2015 – Enrique "Coco" Vicéns, Puerto Rican-American basketball player and politician (born 1926)
- 2016 – Nancy Reagan, American actress, 42nd First Lady of the United States (born 1921)
- 2016 – Sheila Varian, American horse trainer and breeder (born 1937)
- 2017 – Robert Osborne, American actor and historian (born 1932)
- 2018 – Peter Nicholls, Australian science fiction critic and encyclopedist (born 1939)
- 2021 – Lou Ottens, Dutch engineer and inventor (born 1926)
- 2021 – Graham Pink, British nurse (born 1929)
- 2025 – Australian Suicide, Australian professional wrestler (born 1992)
- 2025 – Brian James, British guitarist (born 1955)

== Holidays and observances ==
- Christian feast day:
  - Chrodegang
  - Colette of Corbie
  - Fridolin of Säckingen
  - Kyneburga, Kyneswide and Tibba
  - Marcian of Tortona
  - March 6 (Eastern Orthodox liturgics)
- European Day of the Righteous, commemorates those who have stood up against crimes against humanity and totalitarianism with their own moral responsibility. (Europe)
- Norfolk Island Foundation Day, the founding of Norfolk Island in 1788.
- Independence Day (Ghana), celebrates the independence of Ghana from the UK in 1957.
