= Pinker =

Pinker may refer to:

== People ==
- George Pinker (1924–2007), British obstetrician and gynecologist
- Rachel Pinker, American meteorologist
- Robert Pinker (1931–2021), British sociologist
- Steven Pinker (born 1954), Canadian-American psychologist, linguist and popular science author
- Susan Pinker (born 1957), Canadian developmental psychologist

== Bands ==
- Horace Pinker, American punk rock band
- The Pinker Tones, alternative pop band from Barcelona, Spain
- Pink (surname)
- Pińkowski, Polish surname
