= Pionk =

Pionk is a surname. Notable people with the surname include:

- Neal Pionk (born 1995), American professional ice hockey player
- Richard Pionk (1936–2007), American artist

== See also ==
- Pink (surname)
