= Garden of the Righteous, Warsaw =

Memorial site in Poland

Garden of the Righteous
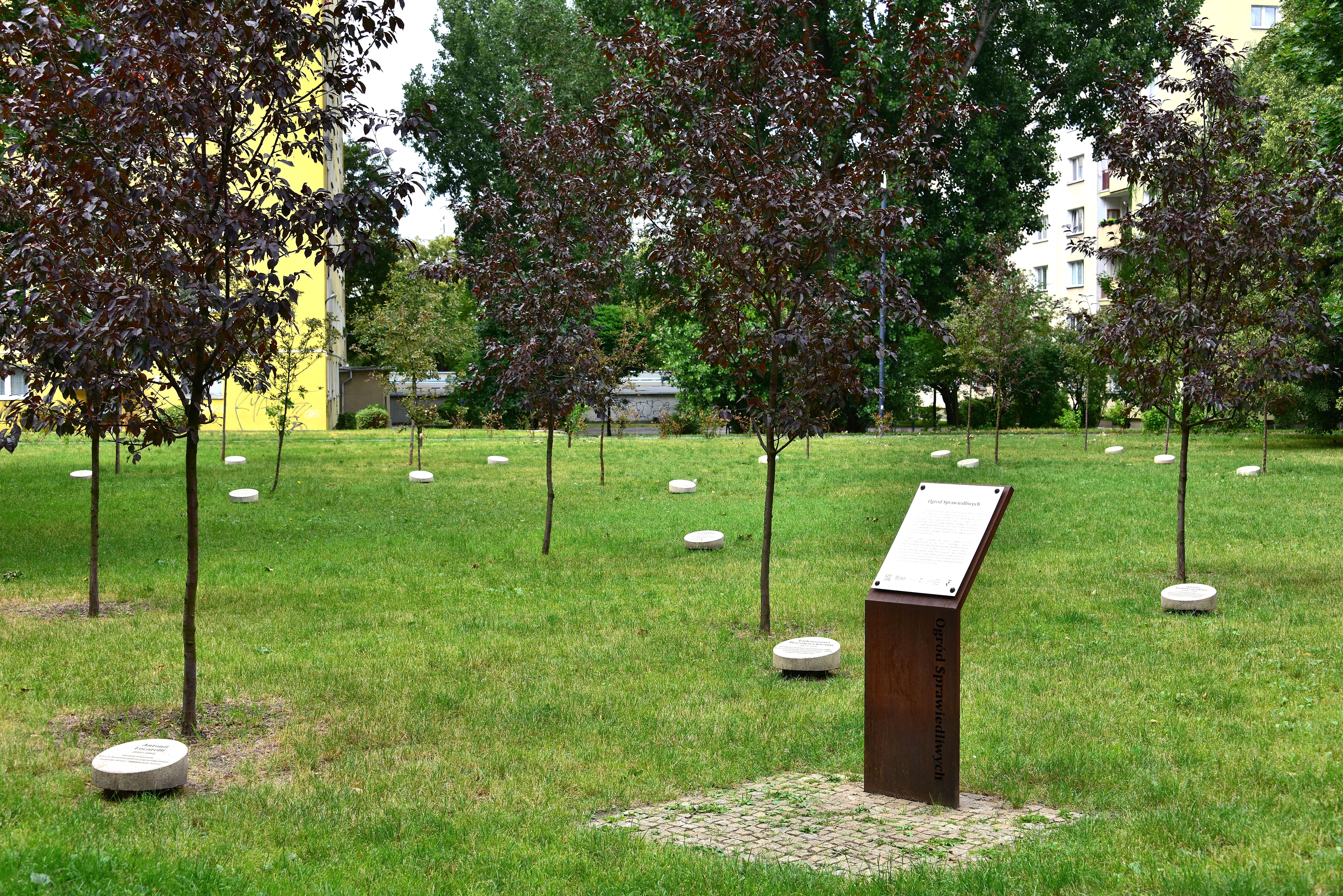
- Garden of the Righteous in 2018
- Interactive map of Garden of the Righteous
- Nearest city: Warsaw
- Coordinates: 52.2458°N 20.9895°E
- Created: 5 June 2014
- Operator: Urząd Dzielnicy Wola Miasta Stołecznego Warszawy

The Garden of the Righteous in Warsaw (Polish: Ogród Sprawiedliwych w Warszawie) is a memorial site in Wola, Muranów. The initiators of the idea are the History Meeting House and the Italian foundation GARIWO. It is a place to honour those who, during the 20th and 21st centuries, in the face of totalitarianism and genocide, had the courage to defend human dignity. Each year, on the European Day of the Righteous (established by the European Parliament in 2012), the Garden Committee, announces the names of those to be honoured with that title. The garden was designed by Barbara Kraus-Galińska's landscape architecture studio.

== Location ==
The garden is located on the Jerzy Jur-Gorzechowski square, on the site of the former "Serbia" women's prison, between Dzielna and Pawia streets, near John Paul II avenue and the Church of St. Augustine.

== Opening ceremony ==
The Garden was inaugurated on 5 June 2014 in a city that experienced the two totalitarian regimes of the 20th century, Nazism and Communism. The date was not chosen by chance: it was decided to open the Garden the day after the 25th anniversary of the first semi-free elections in Poland, June 4, 1989, which then led to the fall of communism.

The idea of entwining the globe with a network of Gardens of the Righteous, created to honour attitudes of people who protected dignity and life of men in totalitarian systems or at times of mass crimes, originated at the Italian Gariwo Foundation, and the Garden of Monte Stella in Milan, Italy, however, it is not devoted only to those who helped Jews during the war.

== Honored ==
Each honored person has its memorial trees will be planted and symbolic stones.

Year	Person	Inscription
2014	Jan Karski	an emissary of the Underground Poland, who called for a halt to the extermination of Jews, and called the Allied passivity the second original sin of humanity
2014	Marek Edelman	member of the command uprising in the Warsaw ghetto, a social worker and a relentless doctor - serving the injured, he rebuilt the moral order of the world
2014	Tadeusz Mazowiecki	a politician striving for the common good, who in protest against the idleness of the world made the mandate of the UN envoy in Bosnia and Herzegovina
2014	Anna Politkovskaya	Russian journalist, murdered for revealing corruption and war crimes committed by her country in Chechnya
2014	Magdalena Grodzka-Gużkowska	soldier of the underground, saving Jews from the Warsaw ghetto, a precursor of treating autistic children
2014	Antonia Locatelli	an Italian missionary who in Rwanda suffered a martyr's death, alerting the world about the Tutsi genocide
2015	Petro Grigorenko	a general of the Soviet army, who in his full career rejected the system and its role in it, on the side of the persecuted, including the disinherited Tatars
2015	Nelson Mandela	an opponent of apartheid, free from hatred and retaliation, which led South Africa from the state of civil war to civil freedom
2015	Hasan Mazhar	Governor of Ankara, who, despite the authorities' crimes and social consent, refused to participate in the genocide of the Armenians (1915–1917)
2016	Witold Pilecki	cavalry, guide to the hell of Nazism, voluntary prisoner of Auschwitz, whose reports were to alarm the world, save victims
2016	Władysław Bartoszewski	a witness to the atrocities of both totalitarianisms, who - resisting lies and violence - was the epitome of decency
2016	Jan Zieja	priest, who always, even in wars, kept the commandment "do not kill - never anyone", recognized as "living proof of the existence of God"
2017	Natalya Gorbanevskaya	
2017	Jan Jelínek	
2017	Roberto Kozak	
2018	Raphael Lemkin	
2018	Adalbert Wojciech Zink	
2018	Armin T. Wegner	
2019	Ewelina Lipko-Lipczyńska	
2019	Arseny Roginsky	
2019	Raoul Wallenberg	

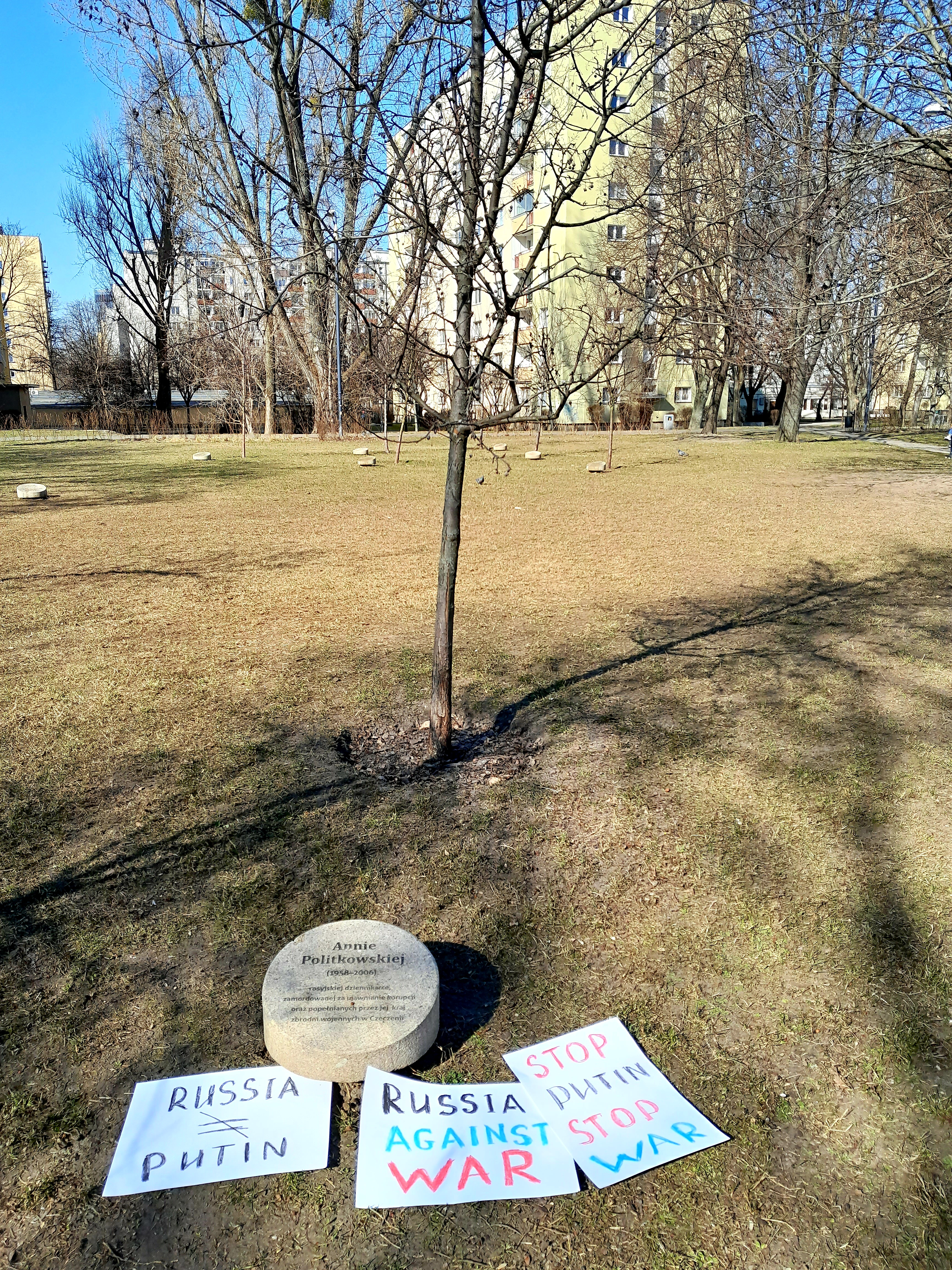
Manifestation in support of Russians who are against Putin, March 19, 2022

== See also ==
- European Day of the Righteous
