= University of Maryland College of Computer, Mathematical, and Natural Sciences =

College of the University of Maryland

Coordinates: 38.98683°N 76.94096°W

College of Computer, Mathematical, and Natural Sciences
- Type: Public
- Parent institution: University of Maryland, College Park
- Location: Symons Hall, College Park, Maryland, United States
- Website: cmns.umd.edu

The College of Computer, Mathematical, and Natural Sciences (CMNS) is the school of biological and physical sciences at the University of Maryland, College Park. It consists of ten academic departments.

In October 2010, the College of Chemical and Life Sciences and the College of Computer, Mathematical, and Physical Sciences merged to form the College of Computer, Mathematical, and Natural Sciences.

== Atmospheric and Oceanic Science ==
=== Affiliated institutions ===
The Earth System Science Interdisciplinary Center (ESSIC) is a joint center between the Departments of Atmospheric and Oceanic Science, Geology, and Geographical Science at the University of Maryland, in cooperation with the NASA Goddard Space Flight Center. ESSIC also administers the Cooperative Institute for Satellite Earth System Studies, which is a joint center with the NOAA's National Centers for Environmental Prediction (NCEP) and the National Environmental Satellite, Data, and Information Service (NESDIS).

The NOAA Center for Weather and Climate Prediction, which houses NCEP's Weather Prediction Center, the Climate Prediction Center, the Ocean Prediction Center, and the Environmental Modeling Center, as well as the Air Resources Laboratory, is located in the University of Maryland's research park M Square. The department has various collaborations with NOAA laboratories as well as NASA Goddard.

=== Rankings ===
The University of Maryland’s undergraduate computer science program ranks 9th among the country’s public institutions and 18th overall in the 2024 edition of U.S. News & World Report’s “Best Colleges.” In 2019, UMD was ranked 14th globally in the Academic Ranking of World Universities in atmospheric science. In 2018, it was ranked 9th. In the U.S. News & World Report rankings for best global universities in geosciences, UMD was ranked 12th in 2019. In the 2010 United States National Research Council rankings, the department was ranked in the top 10 national doctoral programs by both the average regression rank and the average survey rank. Its department of computer science is ranked 13th according to Computer Science Open Rankings, which combines scores from multiple independent rankings.

=== Faculty ===
- Eugenia Kalnay
- Rachel Pinker

==== Former faculty ====
- Antonio Busalacchi Jr.
- Andrew Dessler
- Helmut Landsberg
- Cliff Mass
- Alan Robock
- Jagadish Shukla

== Notable faculty ==
Faculty Member Name	Department	Awards/Honors	Notes
Michael A'Hearn	Astronomy	Gerard P. Kuiper Prize (2008)	Principal Investigator for NASA Deep Impact mission
Ivo Babuška	Mathematics	Birkhoff Prize (1994), Bolzano Medal, Leroy P. Steele Prize for Lifetime Achievement (2012), Society for Industrial and Applied Mathematics Fellow (2009), Engineering Academy of Czech Republic Member (2007), National Academy of Engineering Member (2005), European Academy of Sciences Member (2003), International Association of Computational Mechanics Fellow (2002)	
Victor Basili	Computer Science	IEEE Fellow (1990), ACM Fellow (1997), Washington Academy of Sciences Award (1997), IEEE Computer Society Harlan D. Mills Award (2003), Fraunhofer Silver Medal (2007)	
Rita Colwell	University of Maryland Institute for Advanced Computer Studies (UMIACS)	National Medal of Science (Biological Science, 2006), Royal Irish Academy, Order of the Rising Sun Gold and Silver Star, Stockholm Water Prize (2010), National Academy of Sciences Member, Stockholm Water Prize Laureate (2010), The Royal Society of Canada Foreign Fellow	
Theodor Diener	Cell Biology and Molecular Genetics	National Medal of Science, Biological Science (1987); CMNS Circle of Discovery	First in his field to discover viroids
Michael Fisher	Physics	Wolf Prize (Physics, 1980), Boltzmann Medal (1983), Lars Onsager Prize (1995), Irving Langmuir Prize (1971), Royal Medal in Physics (2005), Rudranath Capildeo Prize (2015), National Academy of Sciences Award for Scientific Reviewing (1983), Fellow of the Royal Society (1971), American Academy of Arts and Sciences Member (1979), American Philosophical Society Member (1993), Brazilian Academy of Sciences Foreign Member (1996), Indian Academy of Sciences Honorary Member (2000), Royal Norwegian Society of Sciences and Letters Foreign Member (2003)	
Elisabeth Gantt	Biology	Gilbert Morgan Smith Medal (1994), American Association for the Advancement of Science Fellow (1982), National Academy of Sciences Member (1996), American Society of Plant Biologists Fellow (2007), Phycological Society of America Award of Excellence (2011), CMNS Circle of Discovery	
Sylvester James Gates Jr.	Physics	National Medal of Science (Physical Sciences, 2011), Mendel Medal recipient, American Academy of Arts and Sciences Fellow, American Philosophical Society Member, National Academy of Sciences Member	
Neil Gehrels	Astronomy	National Academy of Sciences Member (2010), Henry Draper Medal (2009), American Academy of Arts and Sciences Fellow (2008), American Association for the Advancement of Science Fellow (2012), Rossi Prize (2011, 2007), International Academy of Astronautics (2011), George W. Goddard Award (2009), American Physical Society Fellow (1993)	
Oscar W. Greenberg	Physics	Alfred P. Sloan Research Fellow (1964–66), Guggenheim Fellow (1968–69), American Physical Society Fellow, Washington Academy of Sciences Award in Physical Sciences (1971), Washington Academy of Sciences Fellow (1971)	In 1964, Greenberg proposed that quarks exhibit a property called "color," coined from the idea that primary colors red, green and blue make white light. Color, which is unrelated to human perception of color, provides three distinct quantum states for quarks to exist in and explains the strong interactions of quarks. Quarks and color, which were experimentally verified in 1973, led to the Standard Model of particle physics that explains what the world is and what holds it together.
Mohammad Hajiaghayi	Computer Science	National Science Foundation CAREER Award (2010), Google Faculty Research Award (2010, 2014), Office of Naval Research Young Investigator Award (2011), Association for Computing Machinery Fellow (2018)	
Eugenia Kalnay	Atmospheric and Oceanic Science	International Meteorological Organization Prize (2009), American Academy of Arts & Sciences Fellow (2015), National Academy of Engineering Member (1996), American Geophysical Union Fellow (2005), American Association for the Advancement of Science Fellow (2006), American Meteorological Society Fellow (1983)	Director of the Environmental Modeling Center of the National Centers for Environmental Prediction, Author of Atmospheric Modeling, Data Assimilation and Predictability
Vadim Kaloshin	Mathematics	Sloan Fellows (2004–2006), invited speaker at the International Congress of Mathematicians in Madrid (2006), Member of selection committee of speakers for the International Congress of Mathematicians (2010), The Brin Chair in Mathematics (2011–Present)	
Jonathan Katz	Computer Science	Humboldt Research Award (2015), National Science Foundation CAREER Award (2005)	Member of the DARPA Computer Science Study Group in 2009–2010, currently an editor of the Journal of Cryptology
Samir Khuller	Computer Science	ACM Fellow (2022), Elizabeth Stevinson Iribe Department Chair of Computer Science, Google Faculty Research Award (2007), University of Maryland Distinguished Scholar-Teacher (2006), National Science Foundation CAREER Award (1995)	
John C. Mather	Physics	Nobel Prize in Physics (2006), American Physical Society Fellow (1996), National Academy of Sciences Member (1997), American Academy of Arts and Sciences Fellow (1997), SPIE Fellow (2007), Optical Society of America Fellow (2010), American Association for the Advancement of Science Fellow (2012), CMNS Circle of Discovery Award (2013), Gold Medal from Prime Minister of India (2009)	
Jack Minker	Computer Science	American Association for the Advancement of Science Member (1989), Association for the Advancement of Artificial Intelligence Fellow (1990), IEEE Fellow (1991), Association for Computing Machinery Fellow (1994)	
Charles Misner	Physics	American Academy of Arts and Sciences Fellow (2000), Dannie Heineman Prize for Mathematical Physics (1994), Guggenheim Fellowship (1972–73)	Co-author of Gravitation
Sergei Novikov	Institute for Physical Science and Technology	Wolf Prize (2005), Serbian Academy of Sciences and Arts Member (1984), USSR Academy of Sciences Full Member (1981), Fields Medal (1970), Lenin Prize (1967), National Academy of Sciences Foreign Member (1994), Serbian Academy of Art and Sciences (1992), Montenegro Academy of Art and Sciences (2011), Academia Europaea (1993), European Academy of Sciences in Brussels (2003), Honorary Member of London Math Society (1987), Lobachevski International Prize of the Soviet Academy of Sciences (1981), Bogoliubov Gold Medal of the Russian Academy of Sciences (2009), Pogorelov Prize of the Ukrainian National Academy of Sciences (2013), Euler Medal of the Russian Academy of Sciences (2013), Moscow Math Society Award for Young Mathematicians (1964)	
Jogesh Pati	Physics	Dirac Medal (2000), American Physical Society Fellow, Washington Academy of Sciences Award in Physical Sciences (1973), Washington Academy of Sciences Fellow, Guggenheim Fellow (1979–80), Padma Bhushan Award (2013), Scientist of the Year by the American Chapter of the Indian Physics Association (1991), Fellow of the National Academy of Sciences in India	
William Daniel Phillips	Physics	Nobel Prize in Physics (1997), American Academy of Arts and Sciences Fellow (1995), NIST Fellow (1995), National Academy of Sciences Member (1997), Optical Society of America Fellow, Michelson Medal (1996), Scientific Achievement Award of the Washington Academy of Sciences (1982), Outstanding Young Scientist Award of the Maryland Academy of Sciences (1982), Silver Medal of the Department of Commerce, Samuel Wesley Stratton Award of the National Bureau of Standards (1987), Gold Medal of the Department of Commerce (1993), Arthur L. Schawlow Prize in Laser Science from the American Physical Society (1998), American Academy of Achievement Award (1999), Gold Medal of the Pennsylvania Society (1999), Election to European Academy of Arts, Sciences and Humanities (2000), Condon Award of NIST (2002), Archie Mahan Prize of the Optical Society of America, Honorary Freeman of the Worshipful Company of Scientific Instrument Makers (2003), Service to America Award - Career Achievement (2006)	
Roald Sagdeev	Physics	Carl Sagan Memorial Award (2003), James Clerk Maxwell Prize for Plasma Physics (2001), Russian Academy of Sciences Member	
Hanan Samet	Computer Science	IEEE Computer Society W. Wallace McDowell Award; Association for Computing Machinery Paris Kanellakis Theory and Practice Award; University Consortium for Geographic Information Science Research Award; Fellow of the Association for Computing Machinery, IEEE, American Association for the Advancement of Science, International Association for Pattern Recognition, and University Consortium for Geographic Information Science	
Ben Shneiderman	Computer Science	Association for Computing Machinery Fellow (1997), American Association for the Advancement of Science Fellow (2001), National Academy of Engineering Member (2010), IEEE Fellow (2012), IEEE Visualization Career Award (2012), ACM SIGCHI Lifetime Achievement Award and CHI Academy (2001)	
Katepalli Sreenivasan	Physics, Mechanical Engineering	American Academy of Arts and Sciences Fellow, Third World Academy of Sciences Fellow, National Academy of Engineering Member, National Academy of Sciences Fellow, Indian Academy of Sciences Foreign Fellow (2007), and a recipient of Distinguished Alumnus Award of the Indian Institute of Science, Fellow of American Physical Society, Guggenheim Fellow (1989), American Society of Mechanical Engineers Fellow (1993), American Institute of Aeronautics and Astronautics Associate Fellow (1993), American Physical Society Otto Laporte Award (1995), American Chapter of the Indian Physics Association Distinguished Scholar Award (1996), Connecticut Academy of Arts and Science Member (1999), Institute of Physics Fellow (2005), World Innovation Foundation Fellow (2006), American Physical Society Dwight Nicholson Medal for Human Outreach (2008), Nusselt-Reynolds Prize (2009)	
Ellen D. Williams	Physics	National Academy of Sciences Member (2005), David Turnbull Award from the Materials Research Society (2003), American Academy of Arts and Sciences Fellow (2003), American Physical Society David Adler Lectureship Award (2001), Japan Society for the Promotion of Science Fellow (1996), American Vacuum Society Fellow (1993), American Physical Society Fellow (1993), American Physical Society Maria Goeppert-Mayer Award (1990)	Director, ARPA-E

== Notable alumni and former students ==
Name	Degree	Graduation Year(s)	Major	Awards/Honors	Notes
Charles L. Bennett	B.S.	1989	Astronomy & Physics	National Academy of Sciences Member (2005), American Academy of Arts and Sciences Fellow (2004), American Association for the Advancement of Science Fellow (2003), American Physical Society Fellow (1999), Comstock Prize in Physics, Gruber Cosmology Prize (2012, 2006), Shaw Prize (2010), University of Maryland Alumni Hall of Fame (2010), Harvey Prize (2006), Henry Draper Medal from the National Academy of Sciences (2005)	Alumni Centennial Professor of Physics and Astronomy and a Gilman Scholar at Johns Hopkins University
Sergey Brin	B.S.	1993	Computer Science & Mathematics	National Academy of Engineering member, Marconi Foundation Prize recipient	Co-founder of Google
R. Paul Butler	Ph.D.	1993	Astronomy	American Academy of Arts and Sciences Fellow, Henry Draper Medal	N/A
Constance Cepko	B.S. & M.S.	1937, 1940	Industrial Chemistry	National Academy of Sciences Member, American Academy of Arts and Sciences Fellow, Alfred W. Bressler Prize Recipient, CMNS Circle of Discovery award recipient	Developmental biologist and geneticist at Harvard Medical School
Gary Christian	Ph.D.	1964	Chemistry	American Chemical Society Fisher Award in Chemistry recipient, CMNS Circle of Discovery award recipient	Professor Emeritus at the University of Washington and Professor Emeritus at the University of Maryland
George Dantzig	B.S.	1936	Mathematics & Physics	National Academy of Sciences Member, National Academy of Engineering Member, American Academy of Arts and Sciences Fellow, John von Neumann Theory Prize (1974), National Medal of Science (1975)	Developer of the Simplex Algorithm; The Mathematical Programming Society honored Dantzig by creating the George B. Dantzig Prize, bestowed every three years since 1982 on one or two people who have made a significant impact in the field of mathematical programming.
Raymond Davis Jr.	B.S. & M.S.	1937 and 1940	Industrial Chemistry	Nobel Prize in Physics (2002), Comstock Prize in Physics (1978), National Medal of Science (2001), Wolf Prize in Physics (2000)	N/A
Charles Fefferman	B.S.	1966	Mathematics	Fields Medalist (1978), Alan T. Waterman Award (1976), American Academy of Arts and Sciences Fellow (1972), Salem Prize (1971), Alfred P. Sloan Fellowship (1970), National Academy of Sciences Member (1979), American Philosophical Society Member (1989), Stefan Bergman Prize (1992), BBVA Frontiers in Knowledge Award (2022); Bocher Memorial Prize (2008)	Princeton University Professor of Mathematics
Robert E. Fischell	M.S.	1953	Physics	Recipient of TED Prize (2005), National Academy of Engineering Member, Inducted into Space Technology Hall of Fame	N/A
Gary Flake	Ph.D.	1993	Computer Science	N/A	Founder of Clipboard
Herbert Hauptman	Ph.D.	1955	Physics	Nobel Prize in Chemistry (1985), Jewish Academy of Arts and Sciences Fellow, National Academy of Sciences Member (1988), Dirac Medal (1991), Belden Prize (Gold Medal) (1935), RESA Award in Pure Science (1959), Patterson Award (1984), Schoellkopf Award (1986), Gold Plate Award from the American Academy of Achievement (1986), Medal from the Jewish Academy of Arts and Sciences (1986), National Library of Medicine Medal (1986)	N/A
Brendan Iribe	N/A	N/A	Computer Science	N/A	Founder of Scaleform and Oculus VR. Donor of $31 million to the University of Maryland to fund the Brendan Iribe Center for Computer Science and Innovation.
Gina Kolata	B.S. and M.A.	1969 and 1973	Microbiology (B.S.) and Mathematics (M.A.)	N/A	Science Writer at The New York Times
Simon Levin	Ph.D.	1964	Mathematics	2005 Kyoto Prize; National Academy of Sciences Member; American Academy of Arts and Sciences Fellow; A.H. Heineken Prize for Environmental Sciences from the Royal Netherlands Academy of Arts and Sciences (2004); Fellow, American Philosophical Society; Tyler Prize (2014); Margalef Prize (2010); BBVA Frontiers in Knowledge Award (2022); Distinguished Landscape Ecologist Award from the U.S. Regional Association of the International Association for Landscape Ecology (2003); National Medal of Science (2014)	Professor, Princeton University
Tobin Marks	B.S.	1966	Chemistry	Alfred P. Sloan Fellow, American Chemical Society Arthur K. Doolittle Award in Polymeric Materials Science and Engineering (1984), American Chemical Society Award in Organometallic Chemistry (1989), Guggenheim Fellowship (1989–1990), American Academy of Arts and Sciences Fellow (1993), National Academy of Sciences Member (1993), American Chemical Society Award in Inorganic Chemistry (1994), Royal Society of Chemistry Centenary Award (1997), F.A. Cotton Medal for Excellence in Chemical Research of the American Chemical Society (2000), Burwell Award from the North American Catalysis Society (2001), Linus Pauling Award (2001), American Institute of Chemists Gold Medal (2002), Sir Edward Frankland Prize, Royal Society of Chemistry (2004), University of Maryland Alumni Hall of Fame (2005), Royal Society of Chemistry Fellow (2005), German Academy of Sciences Leopoldina Member (2005), National Medal of Science (2005), American Chemical Society Award for Distinguished Service in the Advancement of Inorganic Chemistry (2008), Von Hippel Award, Materials Research Society (2009), American Chemical Society Arthur Cope Senior Scholar Award (2011), Dreyfus Prize in the Chemical Sciences (2011), National Academy of Sciences Award in Chemical Sciences, Gabor A. Somorjai Award for Creative Research in Catalysis (2013), Royal Society of Chemistry Materials for Industry - Derek Birchall Award (2015)	Vladimir N. Ipatieff Professor of Catalytic Chemistry and Professor of Material Science and Engineering, Department of Chemistry, Northwestern University
Willie May	Ph.D.	1977	Chemistry	American Chemical Society Fellow (2011), Department of Commerce Bronze Medal (1981), National Bureau of Standards Equal Employment Opportunity Award (1982), Department of Commerce Silver Medal (1985), Arthur Flemming Award for Outstanding Federal Service (1986), NOBCChE Percy Julian Award for Outstanding Research in Organic Analytical Chemistry (1992), Presidential Rank Award of Meritorious Federal Executive (1992), Department of Commerce Gold Medal (1992), American Chemical Society Distinguished Service in the Advancement of Analytical Chemistry Award (2001), Council for Chemical Research Diversity Award, NOBCChE Henry Hill Award	Director of the National Institute of Standards and Technology and Under Secretary of Commerce for Standards and Technology
C. Thomas McMillen	B.S.	1974	Chemistry	Rhodes Scholar, University of Maryland College of Chemical & Life Sciences' Distinguished Alumni Award (2009)	President, CEO and Chairman, Homeland Security Capital Corporation
Sujal Patel	B.S.	1996	Computer Science	N/A	Founder of Isilon Systems
DJ Patil	M.A. & Ph.D.	1999 & 2001	Applied Mathematics	N/A	U.S. Chief Data Scientist for the White House
Glenn Ricart	Ph.D.	1980	Computer Science	N/A	Founder of US Ignite and CenterBeam
Shayan Zadeh	M.S.	2002	Computer Science	N/A	Founder of Zoosk and Gear Zero
