= Garden of the Righteous =

Garden of the Righteous may refer to one of the following:

- An inexact translation of Riyad-us Saliheen
- Garden of the Righteous Among the Nations, a garden in Yad Vashem commemorating the Righteous Among the Nations.
- Garden of the Righteous in Warsaw
