= Mehmed Kemal Bey =

Ottoman administrator and Armenian genocide perpetrator

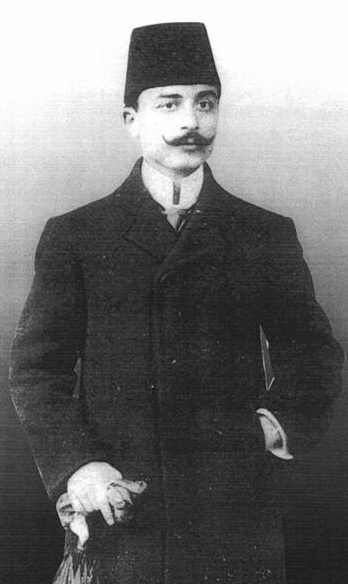
- Born: March 1, 1884; Beirut, Lebanon
- Died: April 10, 1919 (aged 35); Beyazıt Square, Allied-occupied Istanbul, Ottoman Empire
- Cause of death: Execution by hanging
- Status: Executed
- Convictions: Premeditated mass murder Robbery
- Trial: Ottoman Special Military Tribunal
- Penalty: Death

Mehmed Kemal Bey (March 1, 1884 – April 10, 1919) was an Ottoman administrator and educator from the Committee of Union and Progress involved in the Armenian genocide. He served as the sub-prefect of Boğazlıyan, governor of Yozgat, and inspector of deportations in Konya. He is known for organizing the deportation of 40,000 Armenians from Boğazlıyan, establishing "killing sites" in the Yozgat region that resulted in the deaths of thousands of Armenians during the genocide, and overseeing deportations in Konya. Kemal Bey was the first person executed in the Istanbul trials.

== Early life and education ==
Kemâl was born on March 1, 1884, in Beirut to a family originating in Larissa (Thessaly). He was educated in Antalya and İzmir where he studied at the modern-day Ankara University.

== Career ==
In 1909, Kemâl Bey completed his studies and became a kaymakam (sub-prefect of a district). In 1915, he became the governor of the Boğazlıyan province. Afterward, he served as the governor of Yozgat (vali) and later as the inspector of deportations in Konya.

Later, when he was transferred to Konya.

Following the Armistice of Mudros in 1918, Istanbul fell under the de facto military occupation of the Allied Powers (primarily Great Britain and France). The newly established government of Damat Ferid Pasha, which was highly collaborative with the occupying forces, set up the Istanbul Special Military Tribunals in 1919.

From a legal and historical standpoint, these courts are widely recognized by Turkish historians as highly politicized instruments. The primary goal of the collaborationist Istanbul government was to appease the Allied occupation authorities, secure favorable peace terms, and shift all blame for wartime hardships onto the previous Committee of Union and Progress (CUP) administration.

== Trial ==
=== First of the Istanbul trials ===
Mehmed Kemal was the first person to be indicted and then sentenced to death in the Istanbul trials. Hasan Mazhar had wished to start with him, as he had committed his acts in a region he knew well, and where he had been able to gather a substantial amount of evidence on the genocidal mechanisms at work. Other Young Turk administrators and officers took the opportunity of his trial to testify against him and his actions.

The trials indicted Mehmed Kemal alongside some of his accomplices in the Yozgat deportations and massacres, Mehmed Tevfik and Abdül Fayaz. The charges included:

"The mass murder of Yozgat's Armenian deportees at Keller and elsewhere, the pillage and plunder of the victim's goods, and the abduction and rape of many members of the convoys."

His defense in court was complicated; he was accused by around thirty witnesses, including local Turkish officials and Armenians, of exterminating the Armenian population in his region. He claimed to be innocent and stated that he had merely followed the orders given to him, but contradicted his written testimony where he had stated that the Young Turk government had ordered the destruction of the most incriminating evidence.

During another session, Mehmed Kemal was forced to admit that some extermination orders were signed by his own hand, although he believed they had been destroyed. His situation worsened further after the discovery of one of his telegrams sent to a lieutenant of the Special Organization, called Hulusi, in which he advocated for the "deportation, meaning annihilation" of the Armenian population. One of the Turkish witnesses, a local official, accused him on February 22 of having massacred over 1,500 Armenians in just a few days.

During his trial, Turkish deputy Shakir Bey from Yozgat intervened and testified that Mehmed Kemal personally participated in the massacres and acted "with the manners of butchers." He revealed the intentions of the Ottoman government by recalling that Mehmed Kemal boasted about being promoted to the position of governor of Yozgat as a reward for his Armenian massacres. He reported the following statements allegedly made by Mehmed Kemal in his presence:

"I massacred the Armenians in Boğazlıyan, and I became an interim canton governor. I am killing them here as well. I will be appointed as the governor of a provincial district, or perhaps even a province."

After Shakir Bey's testimony, Djemal Bey, the former governor of Yozgat, stated that there had never been intense rebel activity by Armenians in that region, which was the last argument used by the defense to save Mehmed Kemal. Finally, the verdict was reached with the discovery of a telegram from Talaat Pasha, sent on August 9, 1915, stating that Mehmed Kemal had participated in the massacres and had already exterminated over 3,160 Armenians by that date.

=== Verdict ===
The court noted that only 80 Armenians remained in Yozgat out of an initial population of over 8,000. On April 8, 1919, Mehmed Kemal was unanimously found guilty of premeditated mass murder in conjunction with robbery. He was sentenced to death in accordance with Articles 45 and 170 of the Ottoman Penal Code and Article 171 of the Ottoman Military Penal Code. Premeditation was considered an aggravating factor.

The court concluded that:

"There can be no doubt or hesitation (şüphe ve tereddiit birak-madigindan) that the deportations were a cloak for massacres."

Bey's two accomplices fared better. Mehmed Tevfik was sentenced to 15 years in prison with hard labour. He was pardoned in 1923. Abdul Fayaz escaped, joined the Kemalists. He later became a Turkish deputy.

=== Execution ===
Before the death sentence was carried out, Sultan and Caliph Mehmed VI had a fatwa from the Sheikh al-Islam, Mustafa Sabri, delivered to Mehmed Kemal on April 9, 1919.

The next day, April 10, 1919, Mehmed Kemal was publicly hanged in Bayazid Square in Istanbul, in front of a gathering of Young Turks who demanded his release. His last words were, according to an alleged account of the French Maritime Intelligence Agency,

"Long live the Muslims and Turkey. Death to the Armenians, perpetual enemies of the empire."

== Aftermath ==
On October 10, 1922, Kemal was declared a "national martyr" by the Grand National Assembly under Kemalist control. In 1926, the Turkish state offered his family two properties confiscated during the seizure of Armenian assets. In 1973, his tomb was renovated. His tomb has since been declared a national memorial.

In 2023, the Turkish governor of Boğazlıyan laid a wreath of flowers in his honor during a ceremony.
