= Gabriele Nissim =

Italian journalist and historian

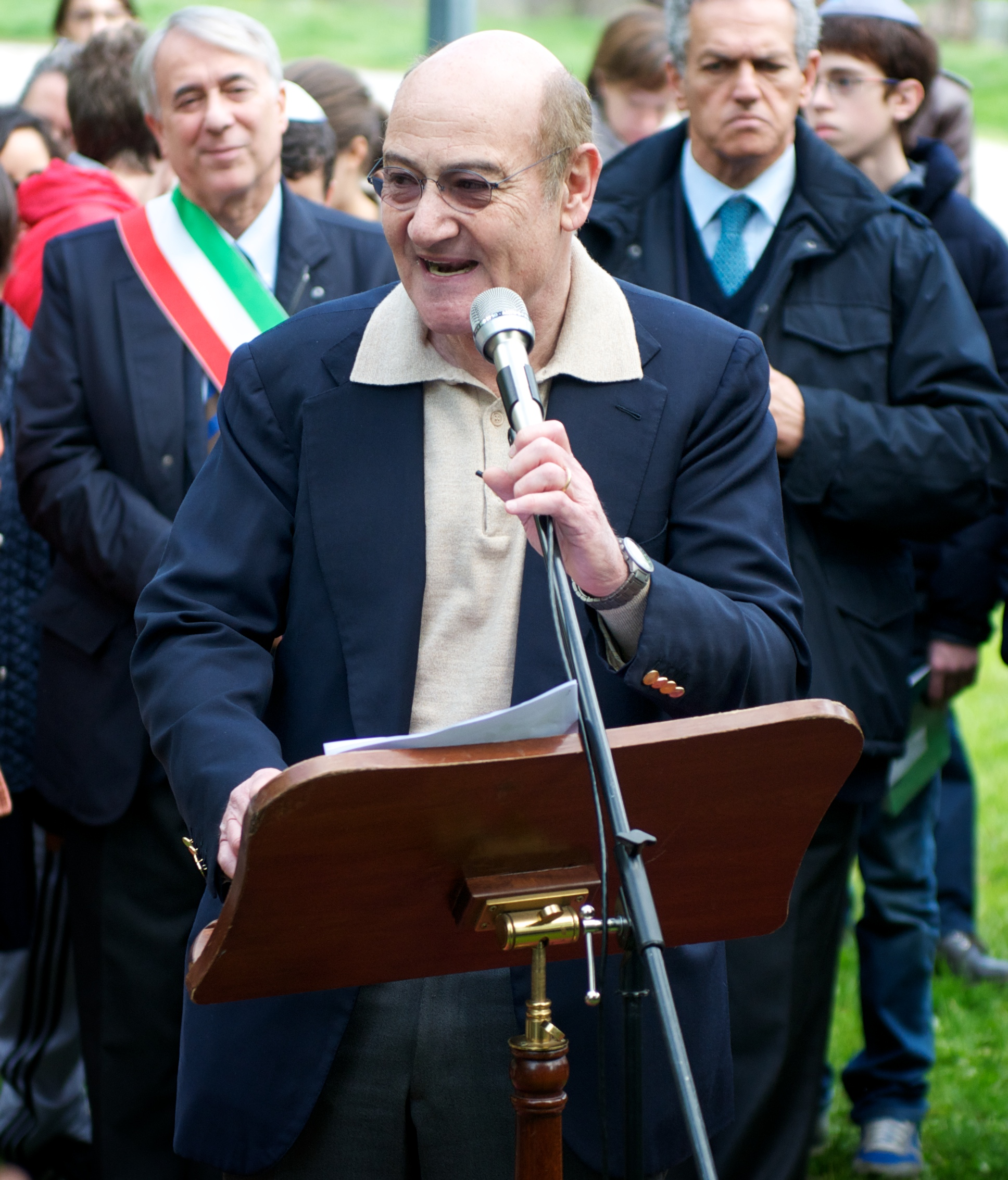
Gabriele Nissim

Gabriele Nissim (born 1950) is an Italian journalist, historian and essayist whose works discuss Eastern Europe.

== Biography ==
Nissim has been a key figure in promoting the establishment of a European Day of the Righteous, which was approved by the European Parliament on 10 May 2012. It takes place yearly on 6 March in remembrance of all people who have stood up against totalitarianism and genocides. This event has become a civil feast in Italy (Italian: Giornata dei Giusti dell'umanità, lit. 'Day of the Righteous of Humanity') after the definitive approval of its constitutive law on 7 December 2017.

Earlier in his career, Nissim founded L'Ottavo Giorno (lit. 'The Eighth Day') in 1982, an Italian magazine about dissent in Eastern European countries. He has worked for the papers Panorama, Il Mondo, Il Giornale and the Corriere della Sera.

Nissim published Ebrei invisibili. I sopravvissuti dell'Europa orientale dal comunismo ad oggi (lit. 'Invisible Jews: The Eastern European Holocaust survivors from the Communist era to today') with Gabriele Eschenazi for Mondadori in 1995. In 1998, he published L'uomo che fermò Hitler. La storia di Dimitar Peshev che salvò gli ebrei di una nazione intera (lit. 'The man who stopped Hitler. The story of Dimitar Peshev who saved the Jews of an entire nation'). In 2003, he published Il tribunale del bene. La storia di Moshe Bejski, l'uomo che creò il Giardino dei Giusti (lit. 'The Court of Good: The story of Moshe Bejski, the man who created the Garden of the Righteous').

For Bruno Mondadori, together with others, he wrote Storie di uomini giusti nel Gulag (lit. 'Stories of the righteous men in the Gulag'). His book Una bambina contro Stalin (lit. 'A little girl against Stalin') tells about an Italian Communist expatriated to the USSR, then arrested and shot without trial, and his daughter's fight to get his memory rehabilitated.

He directed many documentaries for the TV networks of Canale 5 and Italian-speaking Switzerland about underground opposition to communism, the problems of post-communism and on the condition of Jews in Eastern Europe.

In 2001, Nissim founded Gariwo, the Garden of the Righteous Worldwide Committee, which commemorates the Righteous of all genocides. In Milan, Nissim created the Garden of the Righteous Worldwide together with the city government and the Union of Italian Jewish Communities.

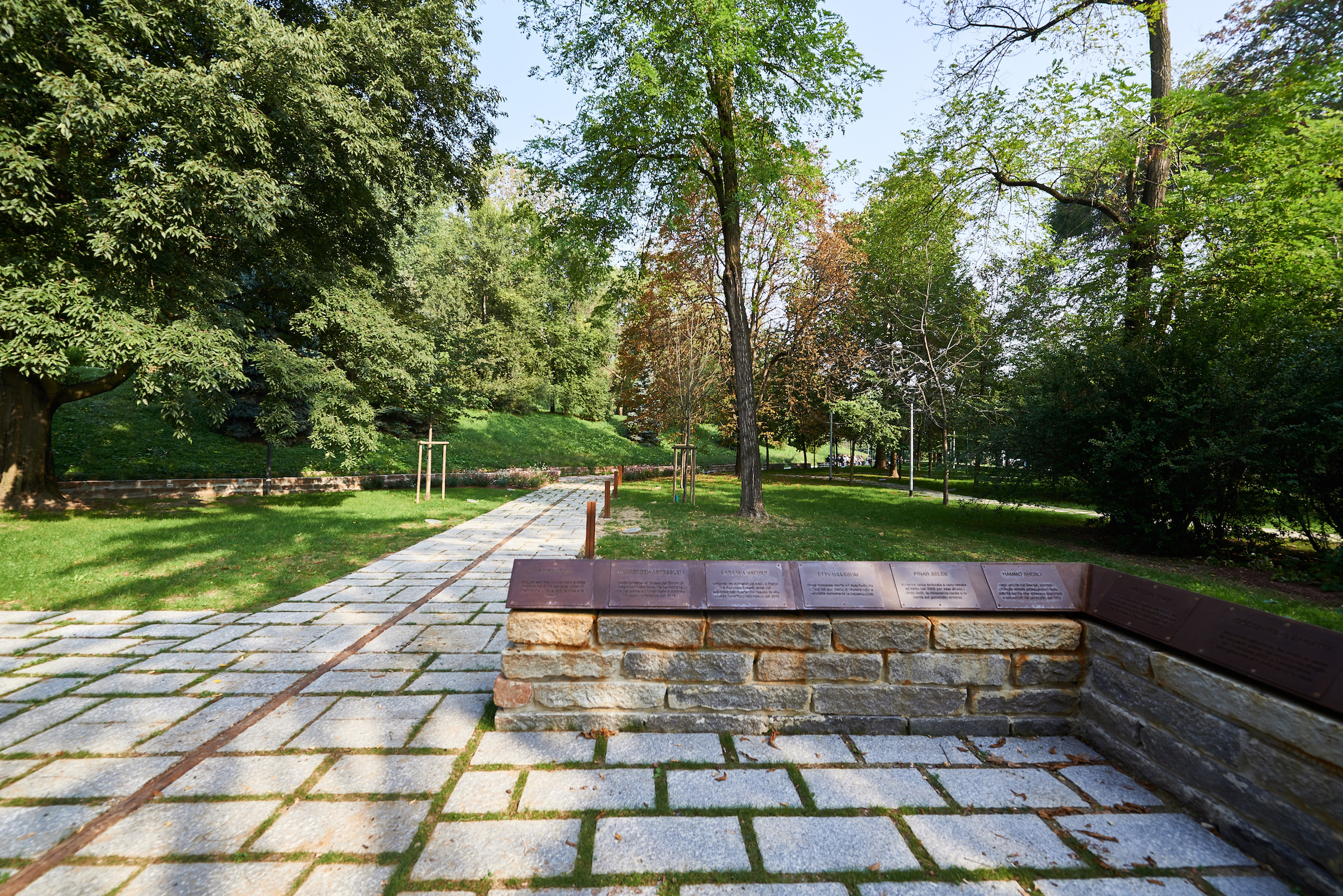
The Garden of the Righteous in Milan

He was one of the creators of the museum devoted to Dimitar Peshev in Kyustendil, Bulgaria in 2001. He created the first park dedicated to victims of the gulag in Milan's Valsesia Park in 2004, and he ushered in a memorial dedicated to the 1000 Italian victims of Soviet totalitarianism on 29 June 2007.

=== International recognition ===
Nissim has been a promoter of international congresses about the Righteous. For his commitment to the subject, he has received numerous international awards.

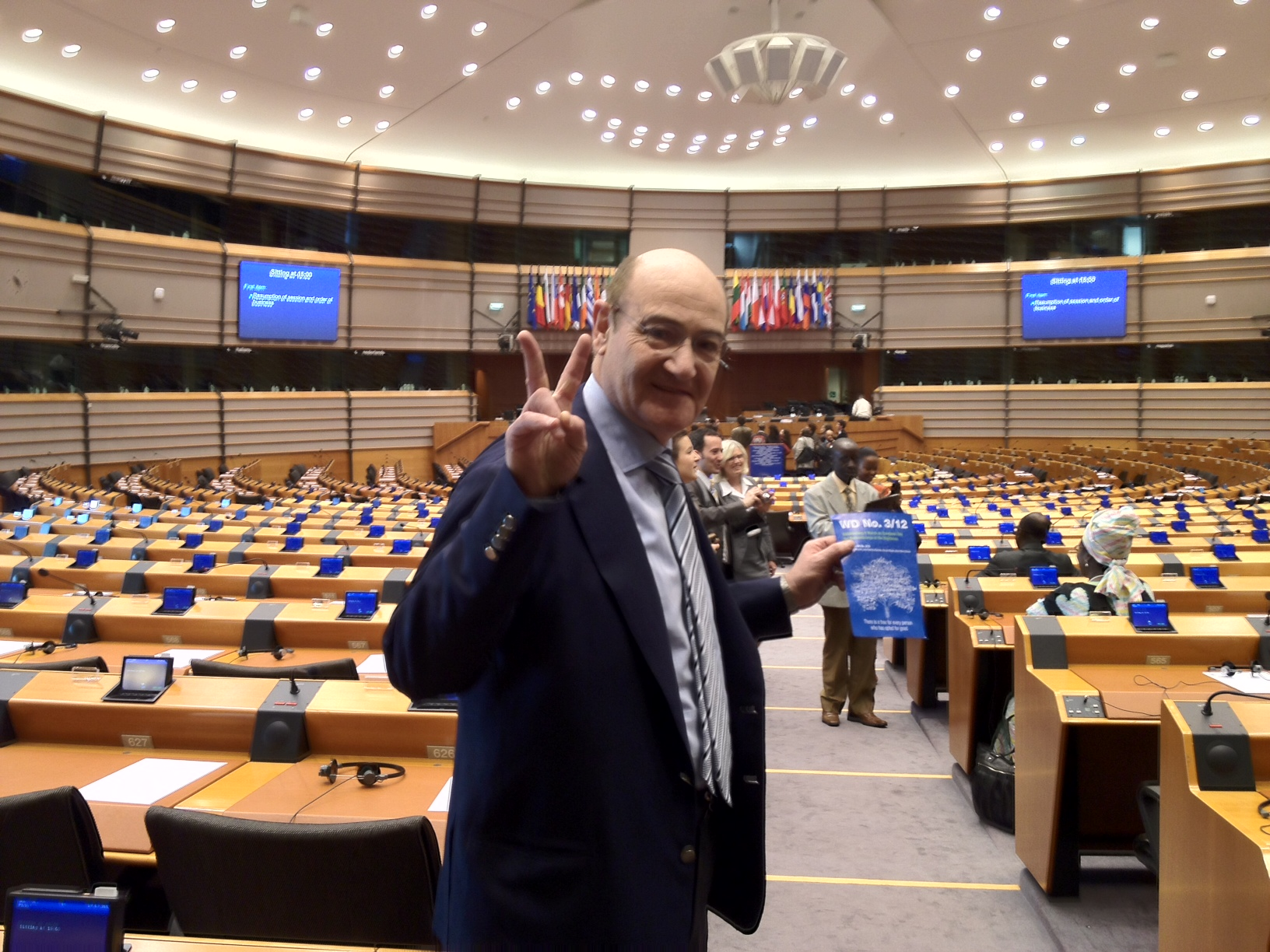
Gabriele Nissim inside the European Parliament

On 6 November 1998, the National Assembly of Bulgaria awarded him the Order of the Madar Horseman, the highest cultural honor in Bulgaria, for his work in recognizing Peshev, the saviour of Bulgarian Jews.

In 2003, he won the "Ilaria Alpi" critics' prize for the TV documentary Il giudice dei Giusti ('Judge of the Righteous')

On 2 December 2007, he received a special mention from Lombardy for his peace activism and activism about the Righteous.

In 2014 Gabriele Nissim received the Ambrogino d'oro from the city of Milan.

In 2016, his book La lettera a Hitler won the Montefiori international award for historic novel of the year and the Fiuggi storia award in the biography category. In the same year, he received a certificate of merit from the Embassy of Armenia.

== Honours ==
Knight of Madara 1st Class (Bulgaria) – ribbon for ordinary uniform

Order of the Madar Horseman – 1st Class (Bulgaria) – 1998

Special Mention, "for his activity for peace and about the Righteous" (Lombardy) – 2007

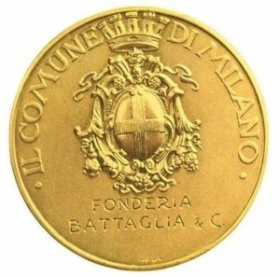
Ambrogino d'oro medal of Milan, Italy

Ambrogino d'oro, "He worked with tenacity and passion to preserve the memory of the persecutions, crimes and genocides of the twentieth century. [... His] constant work for the prevention of new crimes against humanity, with the research and dissemination of exemplary figures of the Righteous directed above all towards young people, the creation of Gariwo and the campaign that led to the proclamation of the European Day of the Righteous. Thanks to his work, the Garden of the Righteous on Monte Stella ... does honor to the city and to the entire country." (Milan) – 2014

Knight of the National Order of Merit (France) - ribbon for ordinary uniform

Knight of the National Order of Merit, "For the eminence of his work and his commitment to the service of memory and relations between our two countries" (France) – 2018

Commendatore al Merito della Repubblica italiana (Italy) – 2020

== Publications ==
- Nissim, Gabriele; Eschenazi, Gabriele (1995), Ebrei invisibili. I sopravvissuti dell'Europa orientale dal comunismo a oggi [Invisible Jews: Eastern European Holocaust Survivors from the Communist era to the Present], Milan, Mondadori, ISBN 88-04-37241-9
- Various authors; introduction by Nissim, Gabriele (2000), Storie di uomini Giusti nel gulag [Stories of Righteous men in the Gulag], Milan, Bruno Mondadori, ISBN 88-424-9189-6
- L'uomo che fermò Hitler [The man who stopped Hitler], Milan, Mondadori, 2001, ISBN 88-04-47331-2
- Il tribunale del bene [The Court of Good], Milan, Mondadori, 2003, ISBN 88-04-48966-9
- Una bambina contro Stalin [A little girl against Stalin], Milan, Mondadori, 2007, ISBN 88-04-57012-1
- La bontà insensata. Il segreto degli uomini giusti [Senseless goodness: The secret of the righteous men] (essay series), Milan, Mondadori, 2011, ISBN 88-04-60660-6.
- La lettera a Hitler. Storia di Armin T. Wegner, combattente solitario contro i genocidi del Novecento [Letter to Hitler: The story of Armin T. Wegner, solitary fighter against the genocides of the twentieth century], Milan, Mondadori, 2015, ISBN 88-04-655-20-8
- Il bene possibile. Essere giusti nel proprio tempo [The possible good: Being righteous in our own time], Novara, UTET, 2018, ISBN 978-88-5115-700-5
- Auschwitz non finisce mai. La memoria della Shoah e i nuovi genocidi [Auschwitz never ends: The memory of the Shoah and the new genocides] (essay series), Milan, Rizzoli, 2022, ISBN 978-8817163071

== See also ==
- Righteous Among the Nations

== Sources ==
- Gabriele Nissim on Haaretz
- Gabriele Nissim on Grandi e Associati
- Gabriele Nissim and the stories of the "normal heroes"
- Gabriele Nissim on Wikio
- Gabriele Nissim receives the 2007 Peace Award of the Lombardy region. In the photograph he ushers in the Garden of the Righteous in Milan
- All books by Gabriele Nissim on BOL.it
- Gabriele Nissim honoring Dimitar Peshev in Sofia
