= Pink (surname) =

Pink is an English surname.

== People ==
- Alfred Pink (1853–1931), English cricketer
- Andrew Pink (born 1983), British Olympian
- Ariel Pink (born 1978), American musician
- Arthur Pink (1886–1952), English Christian evangelist and Biblical scholar
- Bonner Pink (1912–1984), British politician
- Bonnie Pink (Kaori Asada) (born 1973), Japanese musician
- Brian Pink, Australian statistician
- Celinda Pink (born 1957), American musician
- Daniel H. Pink (born 1964), American author and journalist
- Ed Pink (1931–2025), American drag racing engine builder
- Graham Pink (1929–2021), English nurse and whistleblower
- Hubert Pink (1878–1946), English athlete in cricket
- Markus Pink (born 1991), Austrian athlete in football
- Noah Pink, Canadian screenwriter, television producer, director, and swimmer
- Olive Pink (1884–1975), Australian botanical illustrator, anthropologist, gardener, and activist for aboriginal rights
- Robert Pink (1578–1647), English clergyman and academic
- Sarah Pink (born 1966), British social scientist and ethnographer
- Sidney W. Pink (1916–2002), American film director and producer
- Stephen Pink (born 1981), English public relations academic
- Steve Pink (born 1966), American actor, writer, and film director
- Wal Pink (1862–1922), English music hall performer, writer and theatre producer

== Fiction ==
- Danny Pink, character in Doctor Who

== See also ==
- Pink (singer)
- Lady Pink (graffiti artist)
- Pinker
- Pińkowski, Polish surname
