= Hasan Mazhar =

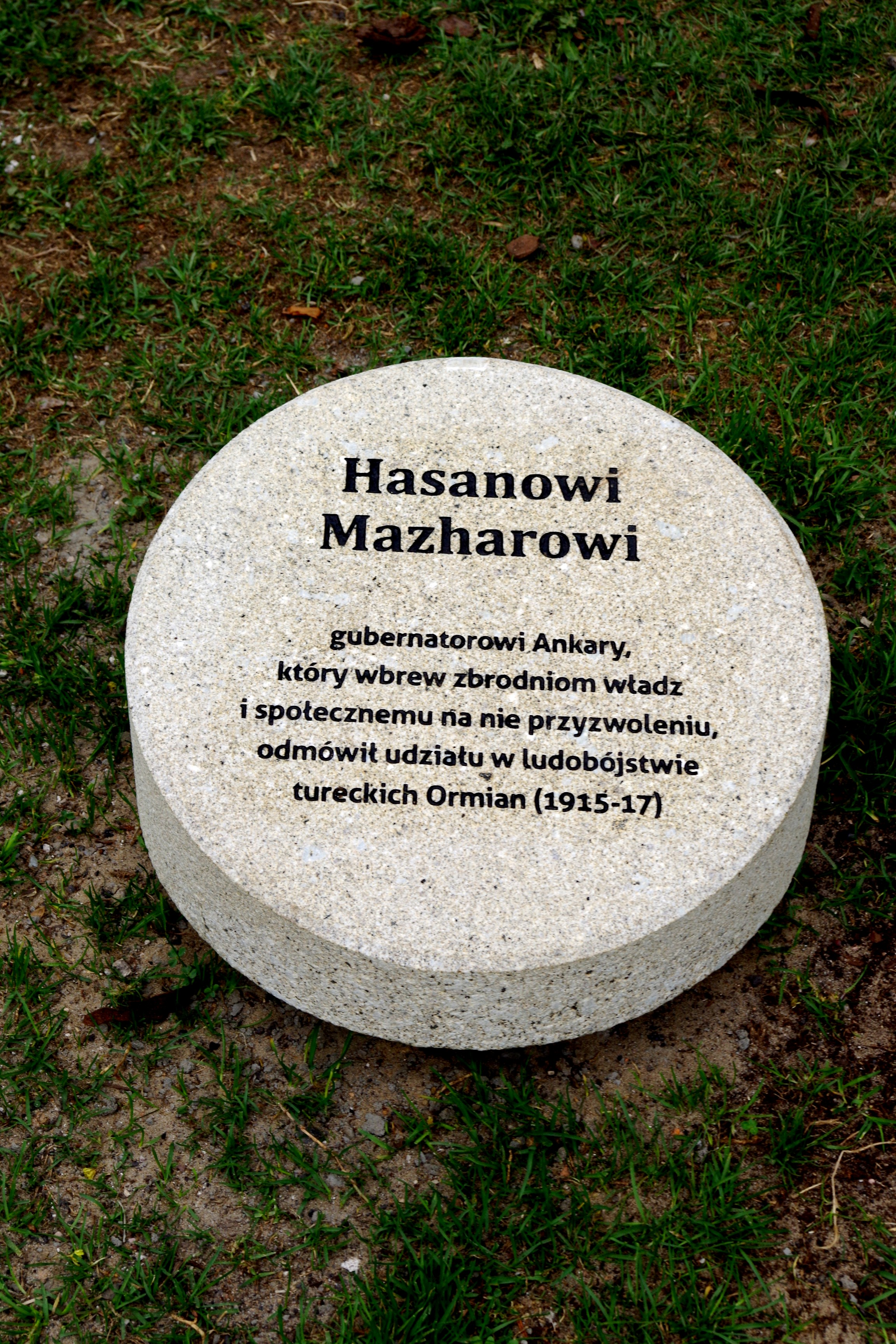
Obelisk commemorating Hasan Mazhar in the Garden of the Righteous in Warsaw. The text translates to "Hasan Mazhar, governor of Ankara, who, despite the crimes of the authorities and society's approval of them, refused to participate in the genocide of Turkish Armenians (1915–1917)."

Hasan Mazhar, or Hasan Mazhar Bey, was a Young Turk governor of Ankara in the Ottoman Empire who refused to participate in the Armenian genocide in 1915, leading to his dismissal.

In 1918–1919, he led the Mazhar Commission, which investigated the Armenian genocide immediately after the war and whose findings initiated the Istanbul trials.

== Biography ==
Hasan Mazhar Bey served as the governor (vali) of Ankara starting from June 18, 1914. In May 1915, he opposed deportation orders issued by the Ministry of Interior, rejecting its genocidal rhetoric.

The Young Turk government quickly intervened, sending a delegate, Atıf Kamçıl, at the beginning of July 1915 to monitor his actions. Atıf Kamçıl was a member of the Special Organization's leadership. Hasan Mazhar was dismissed a few days later, on July 8, 1915. He later said about this event:

"I acted as if I did not understand the deportation orders I received from the Minister of Interior in Istanbul. As you know, other provinces had already completed their deportation operations, which I had not yet started. Then Atıf Bey arrived... He orally conveyed the order regarding the massacre and extermination of Armenians. I told him, 'No, Atıf Bey, I am the governor, I am not a bandit. I cannot do it. I will stand up from my [governor's] throne, and you can come and do it yourself."

== Mazhar Commission ==
On November 23, 1918, Sultan Mehmed VI established a government inquiry commission on the Armenian genocide, and Hasan Mazhar Bey was naturally appointed as its president, as he was one of the few Ottoman administrators who had not been involved in the massacres.

From November 1918 onwards, he sent questionnaires to all provinces to record sworn oral or written statements from Turkish political or military figures.

The commission began investigating the allegations of crimes committed by Ottoman officials, primarily against the Armenian population. Mazhar Bey initially requested that every prefect and sub-prefect send him the originals or certified copies of all orders they received during the genocide. Despite the Young Turk government's instructions to destroy telegrams after reading, some officials retained telegrams, which the commission was able to obtain.

After this initial step, Mazhar took testimony under oath from numerous sources. He wanted the commission to be mixed, not solely composed of military personnel. Mazhar allowed Armenians to access the commission's proceedings while they were taking place. Despite the Turkish state's subsequent ban on accessing these documents, lawyers from the Armenian Patriarchate of Constantinople were able to take advantage of the resources provided by Mazhar to begin compiling the dossier of the Armenian genocide.

The documents and testimonies collected by Mazhar would be used to "support 130 investigation files."

=== Critics and recognition ===
The Mazhar Commission has been criticized for its narrow scope of action, which focused on government officials responsible for the genocide, despite one of the distinctive features of the Armenian genocide being the massive support of civilian populations or irregular troops in the massacres. The complex political situation in the aftermath of World War I and the absence of the concept of genocide prior to the Holocaust may have hindered the commission. Despite the challenging political situation, Mazhar was not afraid of possible reprisals; he prohibited 26 Young Turk deputies from leaving the capital to prevent their escape and had 13 Ottoman ministers interrogated.

However, the contributions of the commission in terms of sources, transparency, and justice have been recognized by genocide historians. Furthermore, Mazhar sought to shed light on the mechanisms of genocide, even though they were not yet referred to by that name, demonstrating a keen sense of justice.

== The Istanbul Trials ==
The establishment of military courts to investigate the crimes of the Young Turks was a logical continuation of the work of the Mazhar Commission, and on December 16, 1918, the sultan officially created such tribunals. Three military courts and ten judicial bodies were established in the provinces.

The military courts judged the most important perpetrators of the genocide based on the documents provided by Mazhar. Most of the accused were sentenced to death between 1919 and 1920. The escape of some of them to foreign countries triggered Operation Nemesis.

Paradoxically, many of the convicted individuals have been regarded as heroes in Turkish history since Mustafa Kemal Atatürk, such as the highly significant example of Mehmed Kemal Bey, the first person sentenced to death by the military courts for organizing "slaughterhouse sites", whose tomb has become a national memorial.

== Legacy ==
On April 27, 2015, a stone was erected in the Garden of the Righteous in Warsaw to commemorate his person and a memorial tree was planted.
