= Pieńkowski =

Suchekomnaty coat of arms used by some of Pieńkowski family

Pienkowski or Pieńkowski (feminine: Pieńkowska, plural: Pieńkowscy) is a Polish surname. Some of them use Suchekomnaty coat of arms or Trąby coat of arms. Notable people with the surname include:

- Alina Pienkowska (1952–2002), Polish free trade union activist and politician
- Ignacy Pieńkowski (1877–1948), Polish painter and pedagogue
- Jan Pieńkowski (born 1936), Polish-British children's author
- Karolina Pieńkowska (born 1993), Polish judoka
- Marek Pienkowski (born 1945), Polish-American medical researcher and clinician
- Władysław Pieńkowski (1846–1919), Polish official, mayor of Radomsko, Zgierz and Łódź
- Zdzisław Pieńkowski, Polish competitive figure skater
