= Ryszard Słomski =

Polish professor

- Born: January 21, 1950 (age 76); Poznań, Poland
- Website: https://slomski.up.poznan.pl/

Ryszard Slomski (Polish pronunciation: [ˈrɨ.ʂart slɔmski]; born January 21, 1950) is a Polish professor and lecturer at the Poznań University of Life Sciences.

== Education ==
Ryszard Słomski attended the Karol Marcinkowski Secondary School in Poznań, known as “Marcinek.” He graduated in 1973 from Adam Mickiewicz University in Poznań, where he studied biology in the Faculty of Biology and Earth Sciences. He undertook PhD studies at the Poznań University of Medical Sciences and beginning in 1974 worked under the supervision of Professor Antoni Horst in the newly opened Institute of Human Genetics of the Polish Academy of Sciences. Since 1986 he has been the deputy director for scientific affairs in the Institute of Human Genetics of the Polish Academy of Sciences. In 1992 he joined the Department of Biochemistry and Biotechnology of the Agricultural Academy in Poznań, currently the Poznań University of Life Sciences, and since 1997 has headed the Department. Słomski is also an active staff member of the NanoBioMedical Centre of Adam Mickiewicz University.

== Academic career ==
In 1976 Słomski received a doctoral degree in medical sciences, and in 1982 he received a postdoctoral degree at the Poznań University of Medical Sciences. In 1990 he obtained a professorial degree. In 2000 he became a full professor at the Poznań University of Life Sciences. He set up the Laboratory of Molecular Genetics in 1992, the first private laboratory conducting DNA tests for forensic medical purposes. Słomski is a full professor, head of the Department of Biochemistry and Biotechnology at the Poznań University of Life Sciences, deputy director for scientific affairs in the Institute of Human Genetics at the Polish Academy of Sciences in Poznań, expert witness in the field of human genetics and a specialist in laboratory genetics. Professor Słomski is a Polish pioneer in conducting DNA tests for diagnostic purposes and promoting molecular diagnostics. He was the first to conduct in Poland studies related to DNA fingerprinting (1987) and DNA amplification by PCR (1989). His current areas of interest include molecular diagnostics of genetic diseases, description of new human genes, biotechnology, forensic medical tests and studies on fossil DNA. Słomski has completed academic internships in numerous academic and scientific centres including La Rabida Children Hospital at the University of Chicago (1978), the Department of Microbiology and Immunology at the University of Illinois at Chicago (numerous times since 1979), the Institute of Human Genetics at the University of Göttingen as a Humboldt Foundation fellow (1990–1991), the Division of Experimental Medicine at the Harvard Medical School in Boston (1996–1997), the PienGen Biomedical Corporation in Knoxville (from 1998) and Max-Delbrück Centre for Molecular Medicine in the Gene Mapping Centre in Berlin-Buch (2002).

== Scientific career ==
Professor Ryszard Słomski organised 25 Summer Schools devoted to molecular studies on human, plant and animal DNA, attended by almost 1000 participants from all over Poland. Based on this experience, he wrote several books on DNA analysis, describing the experiments and presenting the results. The books have been very popular among academics and students dealing with DNA analysis. The last textbook, “Analiza DNA – Teoria i Praktyka” (eng “DNA Analysis – Theory and Practice”), published by the Poznań University of Life Sciences Publishing House in 2008, has been reissued a number of times. In 2008 it was awarded in the “Best university textbook and course book contest” at Book Fairs in Cracow. In 2014 Słomski wrote and edited another book, “Analiza DNA – Praktyka” (eng “DNA Analysis – Practice”), published by the Poznań University of Life Sciences Publishing House, which builds on the earlier experiments. The Poznań University of Life Sciences Publishing House received a prestigious distinction for this book in the best university textbook contest during the 18th Poznań Days of Scientific and Non-Scientific Books on October 5, 2014.

He has a strong interest in the cloning of rabbits and obtaining transgenic animals, including pigs, for the purposes of xenotransplantation, based on the results of studies he conducted in cooperation with Professor Zdzisław Smorąg of the National Research Institute of Animal Production and Dr. Marek M. Pienkowski of PienGen Biomedical Corporation. Słomski has recently been participating in projects aimed at obtaining new generation bio-ethanol from sorghum and Miscanthus and developing new painkillers based on cannabinoids in cannabis. The studies are conducted in Polish laboratories. The research in the field of biotechnology resulted in a numerous patent applications in Poland and two in the USA.

Słomski has been involved in research on the recreation of the extinct wild oxen called aurochs. The genetic material obtained from the available remains of the animal allowed researchers to describe its mitochondrial DNA. The difficulty in analysing the genetic material from available remains of extinct organisms emphasises the necessity to protect free ranging animals.

== Awards and honors ==
Słomski has received several prestigious awards for his scientific achievements. They include the Award of the Scientific Secretary of the Polish Academy of Sciences (1976 and 1977), the Jędrzej Śniadecki Award (1988 and 2000), the Award of the 6th Department of the Polish Academy of Sciences (1979 and 1982) and the Włodzimierz Mozołowski Award of the Polish Biochemical Society (1975). In 1999 Słomski and his team received the Scientific Award of the City of Poznań. In 2002 he was awarded the Jędrzej Śniadecki Medal, and in 2003 the Medal of the National Education Committee. In 2009 Słomski received the 1st class individual Award of the Minister of Science and Higher Education for scientific achievements in biochemistry and biotechnology. In 2012 Słomski and his team received the prestigious award of the Marshal of the Wielkopolska Province, “i-Wielkopolska – the Innovative for Wielkopolska”, for “obtaining transgenic pigs and using their skin and heart valves for medical purposes”. In 2012 he was awarded a Medal of Merit of Poznań University of Life Sciences, in 2013 a Gold Medal for Long Service, in 2014 the Knight's Cross of the Order of Polonia Restituta, and in 2019 Officer's Cross of the Order of Polonia Restituta.

Słomski is a founding member of the Polish College of Laboratory Medicine, Polish Society of Human Genetics as well as the Polish Technology Platform for Innovative Medicine. He is a member of the National Chamber of Laboratory Diagnosticians, a laboratory medical diagnostics specialist and a certified expert witness in the field of human genetics. Since 2013 he has been a member of the 3rd Biological, Agricultural, Forestry and Veterinary Sciences Section of the Central Commission for Degrees and Titles. He is the President and founder of the Foundation for the Development of Biotechnology and Genetics POLBIOGEN.Professor Ryszard Słomski has been a member of the Committee of Human Genetics and Molecular Pathology of the Polish Academy of Sciences, and since 2007 he has been its chairman. Since 2011 he has also been a member of the Committee of Biotechnology of the Polish Academy of Sciences. Słomski is a member of the Polish Biochemical Society (since 1974) and a member of the research councils of the Institute of Genetics and Animal Breeding of the Polish Academy of Sciences, Institute of Natural Fibres and Medicinal Plants (chairman since 2009), Institute of Human Genetics of the Polish Academy of Sciences, Institute of Bioorganic Chemistry of the Polish Academy of Sciences, as well as a member of the Council of the Faculty of Agronomy and Bioengineering of the Poznań University of Life Sciences. Słomski was a member of the editorial board of the Journal of Applied Genetics and is a member of the editorial board of the Annals of Animal Science and Herba Polonica.
