= Suchekomnaty coat of arms =

Polish coat of arms

Suchekomnaty
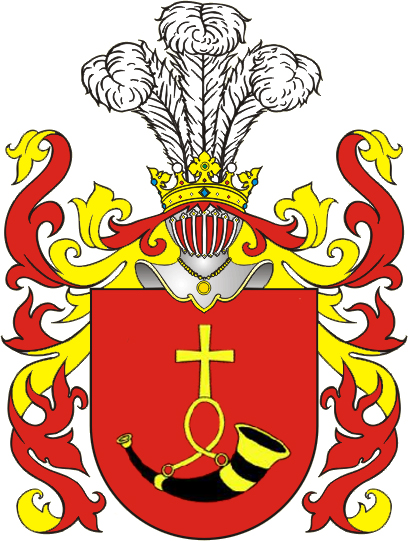
- Battle cry: Unknown
- Alternative names: Kownaty, Suche Komnaty, Suchekownaty
- Earliest mention: Unknown
- Towns: None
- Families: Bejner, Beyner, Białostocki, Brucki-Stempkowski, Błeszczyński, Błeszyński, Bogdański, Bogorski, Buchorn, Chrzanowski, Dąbnicki, Drąbiński, Drabowicz, Dramiński, Dramnicki, Dylik, Gutowski, Homszej, Jabłoński, Kanka, Kaznowski, Kilowski, Kownacki, Lewański, Lipiński, Łomnicki, Martynowicz, Miączyński, Milanowski, Niewodowski, Nikłasz, Obłoczymski, Obłoczyński, Obrycki, Owłoczyński, Owłuczyński, Pieńkowski, Pińkowski, Pinkowski, Ropelewski, Ropelowski, Rydzewski, Rydze, Rzepnicki, Sabatowski, Sędzinko, Skalski, Słowikowski, Sopota, Soroka, Staniławowicz, Stępkowski, Stempkowski, Stępokowski, Suchekomnacki, Tłoczyński, Toczikowski, Toczkowski, Tuczkowski, Uhrowiecki, Urowiecki, Żarowski, Żyła

Suchekomnaty is a Polish coat of arms. It was used by several szlachta families in the times of the Polish–Lithuanian Commonwealth.

== History ==
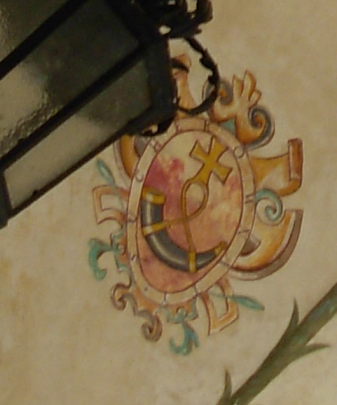
Suchekomnaty coat of arms in Baranow-Sandomierski castle

== Notable bearers ==
Notable bearers of this coat of arms include:

- Aniela Miączyńska
- Stanisław Skalski
- Stefan Edward Łomnicki
- Stanisław Tadeusz Łomnicki

== See also ==
- Polish heraldry
- Heraldry
- Coat of arms

== Sources ==
- Dynastic Genealogy
