= Pińkowski =

Suchekomnaty coat of arms used by some of Pińkowski family

Pińkowski Polish pronunciation: [pʲiɲˈkɔfskʲi] (feminine: Pińkowska) is a Polish surname. Some of them use Suchekomnaty coat of arms. It may be transliterated as: Pinkowski, Pinkowska, Pinkowsky, Pinkovsky. Notable people with the surname include:

- Hanna Pińkowska, Polish engineer, professor at Wrocław University of Economics
- Heiko Pinkowski (born 1966), German actor, screenwriter and film producer
- Edward Pinkowski (1916–2020), American writer, journalist, and historian of Polish descent
- Józef Pińkowski (1929–2000), Polish politician and economist, Prime Minister of Poland
- Martha Leão Pinkowska, Brazilian beauty pageant titleholder, 1957 Miss Goiás

== See also ==
- Pieńkowski
