= Regina Pinkert =

Polish opera singer and soprano

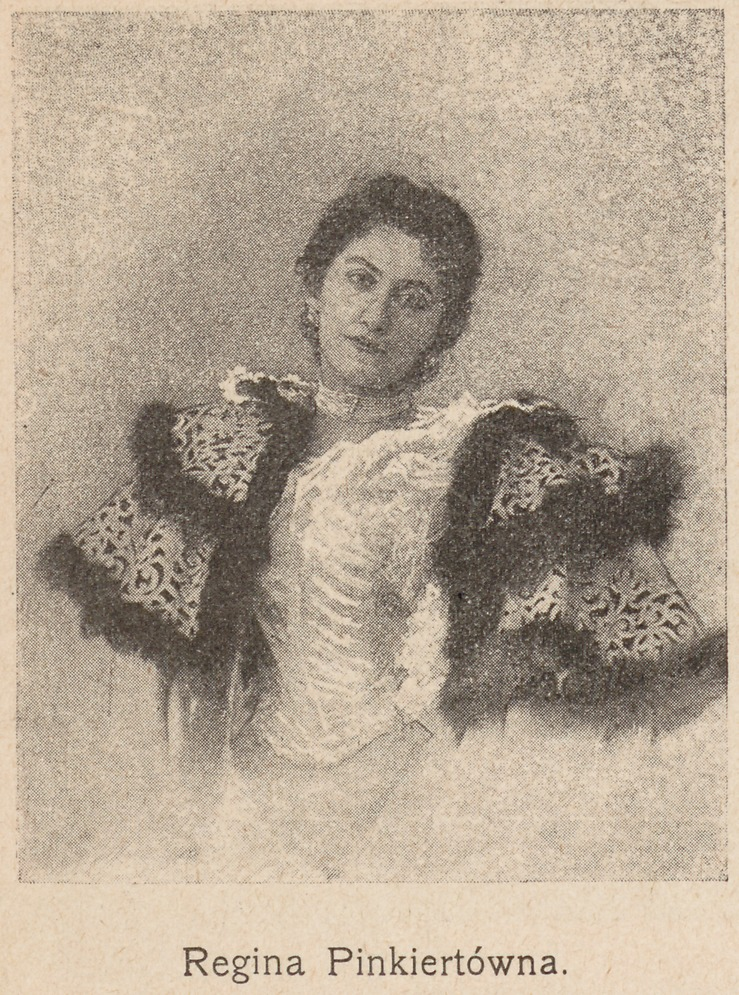

Regina Pinkert (1869–1931) was a Polish opera singer and soprano.

She first came to attention in the United States when appearing at the Manhattan Opera House for the 1906-07 season.
