= Marek Pienkowski =

Polish-American medical researcher and clinician

Marek Maria Pienkowski
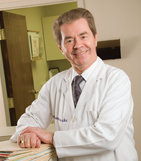
- Marek Pienkowski in 2010
- Born: 8 September 1945; Łódź, Poland
- Citizenship: United States and Poland
- Known for: Innovations in diagnosis and treatment of immunological deficiencies and asthma/allergic disorders
- Awards: Kosciuszko Foundation Eminent Scientist
- Scientific career
- Fields: Immune disorders, Allergy, and Asthma

Marek Maria Pienkowski (born 8 September 1945) is a Polish-American medical researcher and clinician focused on broad aspects of immunological diagnosis and treatment. He collaborated in important discoveries related to immunology, viral oncogenes, genetic engineering, and cloning and has implemented desensitization treatments for allergic disorders based on this research into his clinical practice.

He is also recognized as a cultural ambassador for the propagation of artistic, scientific, and business dialogue between the U.S. and Poland and has been appointed by the government of Poland and accredited by the U.S. State Department as an Honorary Consul. He authored the biographical memoir Iron or Steel: A Memoir on Living Dreams.

== Medical research and practice ==
Pienkowski has made important contributions to biomedical research and development as well as to immunological clinical practice as related to immune disorders, allergy, sinusitis, and asthma. He has published more than fifty scientific papers as well as two books including the handbook for human embryology employed by medical students in Poland for over a decade. His first scientific contribution was published at age 21 in the prestigious journal Nature. He has since published highly cited research on mechanisms for allergic disease, desensitization treatments for anaphylactic shock, viral causes of cancer, culturing of human tumors in nude mice, genetic engineering to produce human proteins of therapeutic value in domestic animals, propagation of engineered genes via cloning, and management of COVID-19 vaccination of patients with anaphylactic syndrome.

He was founder and chairman of the board for Piengen Biomedical Corporation, which developed novel cloning technology and produced human proteins in the milk of transgenic domestic animals. Piengen represented the collaboration of a number of noted scientists, including Ryszard Słomski, Zdislaw Smorag, and Piotr Sicinski. Pienkowski has served on the boards of Pro2Serve Corporation and EcoSMART Technologies.

Pienkowski established a clinical practice in 1984 to serve patients with allergies, asthma, and immunological disorders. His clinic has employed his research on immunoglobulin treatments for patients with immunological deficiencies. In one notable case, he pioneered use of plasma from a hyper-immunized honeybee keeper to protect a patient who was severely allergic to honeybee stings. His practice has also pioneered treatments for peanut allergies.

Pienkowski was born in Poland and earned his M.D. and Ph.D. in immunology from the Medical University of Warsaw from 1963 to 1971, where he studied and worked under the direction of the distinguished Polish scientist Kazimerz Ostrowski. He served as visiting scientist at the University of Pennsylvania Wistar Institute from 1972 to 1973. Working under the direction of Hilary Koprowski (inventor of the world's first live Polio vaccine), Pienkowski was one of Koprowski's "hand-picked staff of. . . extraordinary scientists. . . [who] had one or more talents other than science. They were creative. They were cultured." At Wistar, Pienkowski collaborated with Koprowski on research into cancer-causing viruses. Upon returning to Poland, Pienkowski became an associate professor and chairman in the Division of Immunology at the Medical Center of Postgraduate Education in Warsaw.

In 1974, Pienkowski moved to the U.S. to become associate professor in the Department of Anatomy at the Michigan State University College of Human Medicine in Lansing. Upon receiving nostrification of his medical degrees in the U.S., Pienkowski became a resident in internal medicine at the Henry Ford Hospital in Detroit, Michigan in 1979 and furthered his education as a post-doctoral fellow in clinical immunology at Johns Hopkins School of Medicine in Baltimore, Maryland under the mentorship of Professor Phillip S. Norman.

== Cultural ambassador ==
Pienkowski has been engaged in propagating cultural, artistic, scientific, and business dialogue between the U.S. and Poland since the early 1990s. He authored a biographical memoir Iron or Steel: A Memoir on Living Dreams to share "the opportunities I've had, the choices I made, and the motivating factors and values that have driven me."

Pienkowski was designated an Honorary Consul of the Republic of Poland by the U.S. State Department in 2011. In this role he facilitates business relationships and economic cooperation between Poland and the U.S. and assists in cultural exchanges.

He established the Marek Maria Pienkowski Foundation in 2006 "to foster the development of fine art as a means of human expression in today's world while widening the definition of art to all realms of the human experience." The foundation's ongoing activities encompass organizing educational and cultural exchanges, including biannual exchanges for students and faculty of the School of Art at the University of Tennessee, the Poznań Academy of Fine Arts, and the Wrocław Academy of Fine Arts; annual international workshops in Poland for young artists; and exhibitions of student work in both Poland and the U.S. It also funds and awards sponsored scholarships: the Stefan Pienkowski Scientific Award issued by the University of Warsaw for Outstanding Scientific Achievement in Poland and the Marek Maria Pienkowski Award presented by the Academy of Fine Arts in Warsaw to an Outstanding First Year Student. The foundation has established galleries in Knoxville, Tennessee and Chelm, Poland that feature contemporary Polish art.

He founded PolandNow in 2013, a civic organization based in Knoxville, Tennessee to promote and strengthen Polish-American cooperation and relationships. PolandNow hosted its first public event in downtown Knoxville on May 3, 2012, in celebration of contemporary Polish culture and to commemorate Poland's Constitution Day.

Pienkowski led establishment of Knoxville's Sister City relationship with Chelm, Poland through the Sister Cities International organization with Victor Ashe (Mayor of Knoxville from 1987 to 2003 and U.S. Ambassador to Poland from 2004 to 2009).

Pienkowski supported Friendship Force International, an organization that strives to build "global goodwill through personal friendships," with a cultural exchange to Poland for members of the organization's Knoxville chapter.

Pienkowski utilized his background in science and research to implement a collaborative project between the University of Tennessee's Department of Animal Science and the University of Life Sciences in Lublin to pioneer large-animal embryo transfer technology in Poland. This project resulted in the introduction of American Angus beef to that country. The cattle farm that grew out of this project generates high-quality beef, sufficient fertilizer to sustain the farm, and ethanol for fuel and cattle feed.

== Honors ==
Pienkowski's achievements as a medical researcher and clinician as well as cultural ambassador have received recognition. He has been named a Kosciuszko Foundation Eminent Scientist and named a member of the Kosciuszko Foundation board of trustees. He was honored by the Tennessee House of Representatives in a House Joint Resolution of Commendment. He has been designated colonel, aide-de-camp, governor's staff in both Tennessee and Kentucky. He has also been recognized by U.S. political figures and groups. He was named Physician of the Year by the National Republican Congressional Committee Physicians Advisory Board, was awarded the Republican senatorial Medal of Freedom, and recognized in the US House of Representatives Congressional Record.

He was recognized by the Polish news and opinion magazine Przegląd in 2004 as one of the "100 Most Influential Polish Citizens Abroad."

Pienkowski is a member of the American Medical Association, Tennessee Medical Association, American Academy of Allergy and Immunology, European Academy of Allergy and Clinical Immunology, American College of Allergy, Asthma and Immunology, and Knoxville Academy of Medicine. He is a member of the board of trustees of the Kosciuszko Foundation.

== See also ==
- List of Poles
- List of Polish Americans
