= Governor of Yozgat =

Governor of a Turkish Province

Governor of Yozgat Yozgat Valiliği
- Logo of the Governor of Yozgat
- Incumbent; Mehmet Ali Özkan since August 16, 2023
- Appointer: President of Turkey; On the recommendation of the Turkish government
- Term length: No set term length or limit
- Inaugural holder: Ali Rıza Bey; 1927
- Website: Office of the Governor

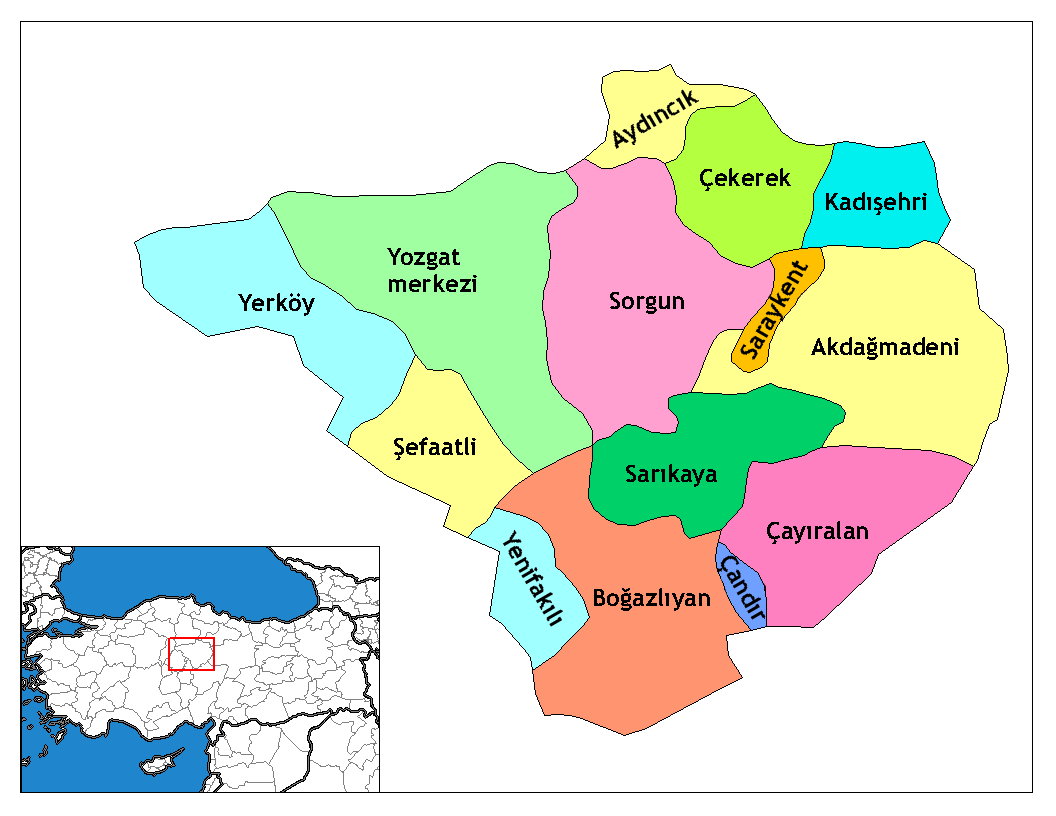
Map of the province of Yozgat, showing the provincial districts.

The governor of Yozgat (Turkish: Yozgat Valiliği) is the bureaucratic state official responsible for both national government and state affairs in the province of Yozgat. Similar to the governors of the 80 other provinces of Turkey, the governor of Yozgat is appointed by the government of Turkey and is responsible for the implementation of government legislation within Yozgat. The governor is also the most senior commander of both the Yozgat provincial police force and the Yozgat Gendarmerie.

== Appointment ==
The governor of Yozgat is appointed by the president of Turkey, who confirms the appointment after recommendation from the Turkish government. The Ministry of the Interior first considers and puts forward possible candidates for approval by the cabinet. The governor of Yozgat is therefore not a directly elected position and instead functions as the most senior civil servant in the province of Yozgat.

=== Term limits ===
The governor is not limited by any term limits and does not serve for a set length of time. Instead, the governor serves at the pleasure of the government, which can appoint or reposition the governor whenever it sees fit. Such decisions are again made by the cabinet of Turkey. The governor of Yozgat, as a civil servant, may not have any close connections or prior experience in Yozgat Province. It is not unusual for governors to alternate between several different provinces during their bureaucratic career.

== Functions ==
The governor of Yozgat has both bureaucratic functions and influence over local government. The main role of the governor is to oversee the implementation of decisions by government ministries, constitutional requirements and legislation passed by Grand National Assembly within the provincial borders. The governor also has the power to reassign, remove or appoint officials a certain number of public offices and has the right to alter the role of certain public institutions if they see fit. Governors are also the most senior public official within the province, meaning that they preside over any public ceremonies or provincial celebrations being held due to a national holiday. As the commander of the provincial police and Gendarmerie forces, the governor can also take decisions designed to limit civil disobedience and preserve public order. Although mayors of municipalities and councillors are elected during local elections, the governor has the right to re-organise or to inspect the proceedings of local government despite being an unelected position.

== List of governors of Yozgat ==
- Ahmet Cevdet Ertuğrul (1922–1923)
- Fahri Bey (1923–1924)
- Hasan Faiz Ergun (1924–1925)
- İsmail Adil Güven (1925–1927)
- İbrahim Hazım Mat (1927–1929)
- Ali Rıza Ceylan (1929–1932)
- Ekrem Ergür (1932–1935)
- Bahaeddin Kökdemir (1935–1939)
- Cemal Celal Tüzün (1939–1942)
- Eşref Erkut (1942–1945)
- Burhanettin Teker (1945–1946)
- Ziya Kasnakoğlu (1946–1947)
- Recai Türeli (1947–1949)
- Kamil Tuncel (1949–1950)
- Ahmet Demir (1950–1951)
- Fevzi Karakülah (1951–1953)
- Ali Rıza Yaradanakul (1953–1954)
- Eşref Ayhan (1954–1955)
- Sait Kemalî Atay (1955–1958)
- Hadi Ömür (1958–1960)
- Sadık Erdem (1960)
- Yakup Yücel (1960–1961)
- Sadi Kâzım Süer (1961–1962)
- Cezmi Kartay (1962–1964)
- Ahmet Sadullah Verel (1964–1966)
- Mehmet Aldan (1966–1968)
- Ali Rıza Yaradanakul (1968–1970)
- Fahri Centel (1970–1972)
- Mustafa Kemal Demirtaş (1972–1975)
- Sabahattin Çakmakoğlu (1975–1978)
- Yılmaz Ergun (1978–1979)
- Kenan Güven (1979–1981)
- Hasan Bamyacı (1981–1984)
- M. İlyas Aksoy (1985–1991)
- Adnan Darendeliler (1991–1992)
- Sami Sönmez (1992–1996)
- Hüseyin Önal (1996–2000)
- Muammer Muşmal (2000–2003)
- Gökhan Sözer (2003–2006)
- Amir Çiçek (2006–2010)
- Necati Şentürk (2010–2012)
- Abdulkadir Yazıcı (2012–2016)
- Kemal Yurtnaç (2016–2018)
- Kadir Çakır (2018–2020)
- Ziya Polat (2020–2023)
- Mehmet Ali Özkan (2023–)

== See also ==
- Governor (Turkey)
- Yozgat Province
- Ministry of the Interior (Turkey)
