= Antonia Locatelli =

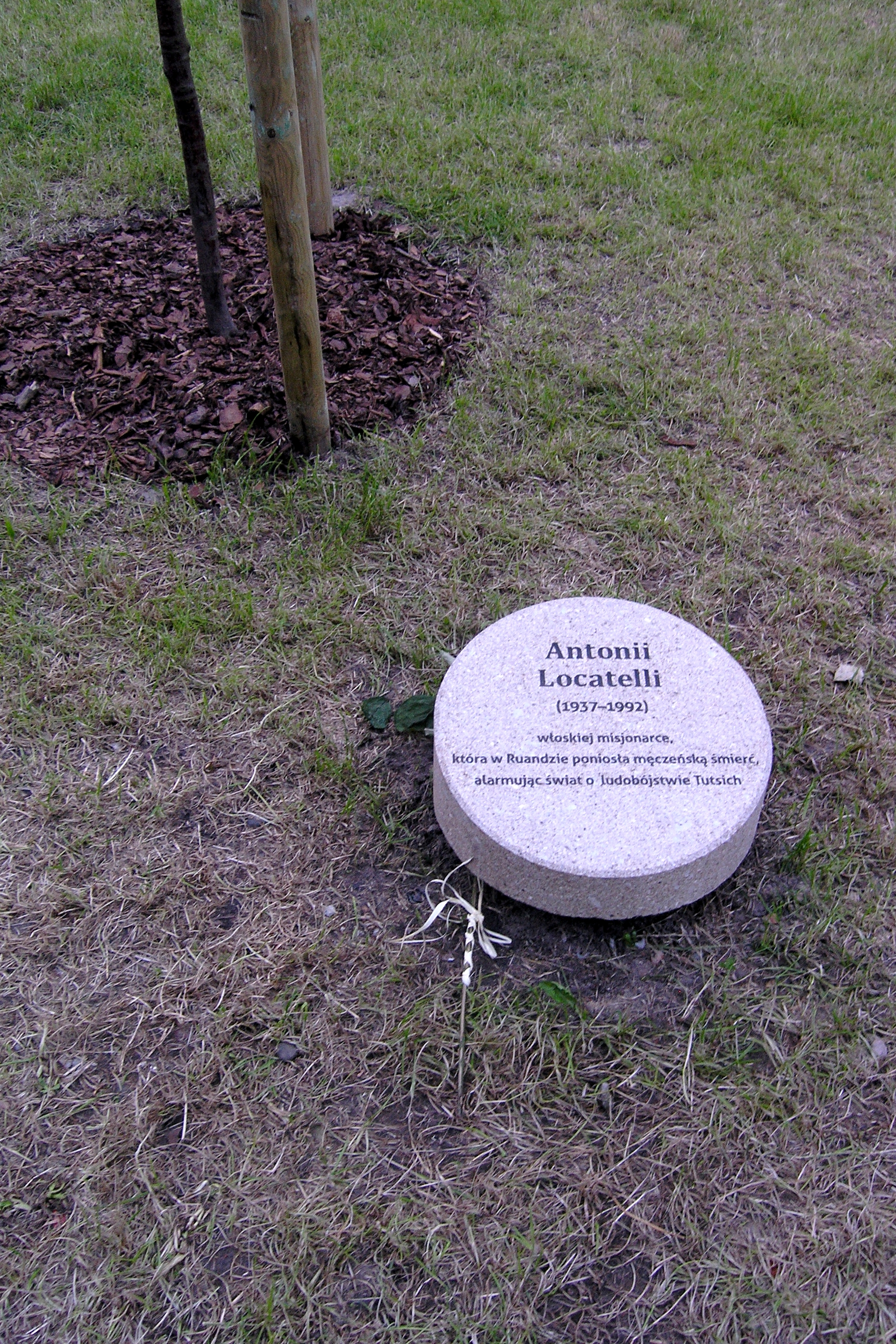
The stone commemorating Antonia Locatelli in the Garden of the Righteous, Warsaw.

Antonia Locatelli (16 November 1937 – 10 March 1992) was an Italian Roman Catholic missionary educator who had lived in Rwanda since the early 1970s.

In March 1992, she witnessed massacres of the Tutsis taking place in the Bugesera region, south of Kigali. In an attempt to save 300 to 400 Tutsis, she phoned the Belgian embassy, French RFI Radio and the BBC.

"I know that the people who came to commit these murders came from outside. They were brought by government vehicles. Contrary to what is said, it is not a popular anger against the Tutsi, it is a deliberate movement of the government to commit political killings."

Antonia Locatelli in a telephone call to French station RFI, March 9, 1992

== Death ==
On the night between 9 and 10 March 1992, she was gunned down by a group of presidential guards who had arrived from Kigali.

Her murder was announcend on RFI the next morning:

"Since the beginning of the massacres in the region, she was in charge of Tutsi refugees’ sheltering. Her house was full of refugees, women and children, who did not get room inside the church or in classrooms which were already packed. She informed us hourly about the tragedy's development. And it is thanks to her testimony that we knew that soldiers were circling Nyamata Church to prevent refugees from going there."

Antonia Locatelli is buried in Nyamata, near the church in which, during the Rwandan genocide two years later, ten thousand Tutsis were massacred.

During the commemoration ceremony marking the 25th anniversary of the Rwandan genocide (Kigali, April 7, 2019), Paul Kagame paid tribute to Antonia in his opening speech:

"Joining us today are families from other countries, whose husbands, fathers, sisters, and aunts were claimed by the same deadly ideology. (...) Tonia Locatelli, killed in 1992 for telling the truth of what was to come. The only comfort we can offer is the commonality of sorrow, and the respect owed to those who had the courage to do the right thing."

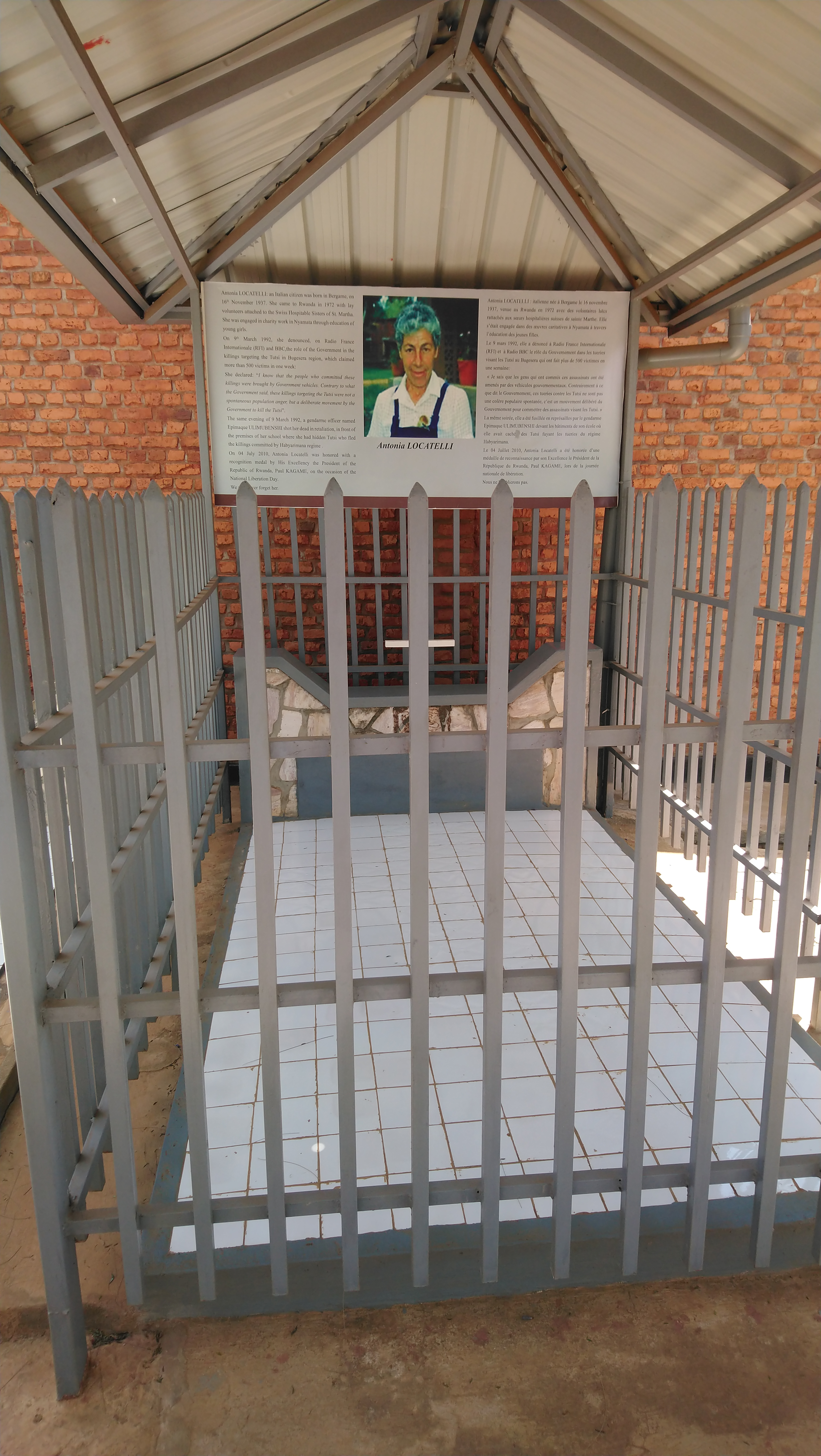
Antonia Locatelli's grave in Nyamata, inaugurated by Paul Kagame

== Books ==
- P. Costa–L. Scalettari, La lista del console, published by Paoline, Milan, 2004, page 43.
- André Sibomana, J’accuse per il Rwanda, published by Gruppo Abele, Turin, 1998, pages 65 and 117.
