= European Day of the Righteous =

European Union annual celebration

European Day of Remembrance for the Righteous
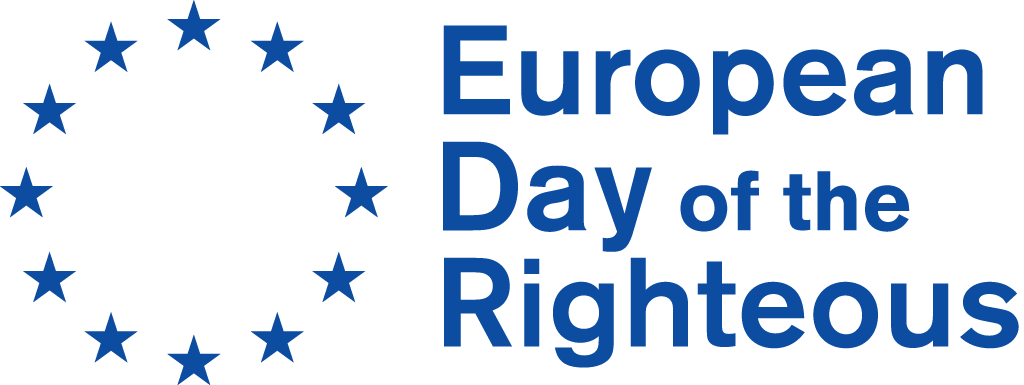
- European Day of Remembrance for the Righteous logo
- Official name: European Day of Remembrance for the Righteous
- Also called: European remembrance day for the Armenian Genocide
- Observed by: Europe
- Type: Secular
- Celebrations: "adopting a Righteous", visiting a Garden, laying a flower, leaving a dedication
- Date: 6 March
- Next time: 6 March 2027
- Frequency: annual
- Related to: Armenian Genocide Remembrance Day, International Holocaust Remembrance Day, Day of Remembrance of the Victims of the Rwanda Genocide, Cambodian Genocide Remembrance Day

The European Day of the Righteous is a celebration established in 2012 by the European Parliament to commemorate those who have stood up against crimes against humanity and totalitarianism with their own moral responsibility. By this celebration the concept of Righteous as worked out by Yad Vashem is broadened to all genocide cases and forms of totalitarianism thanks to the commitment of Moshe Bejski.

The European day of the Righteous is celebrated every year on 6 March, the anniversary of Moshe Bejski's death.

== History ==
The call for the European Union and the Council of Europe to set up a European day in the memory of the Righteous came from a hundred prominent Italian and European personalities of the world of culture under the aegis of non-profit association Gariwo, the forest of the Righteous. It soon received the support of important institutions such as the Presidency of the Republic of Poland, the Václav Havel foundation, the association Libera founded by father Luigi Ciotti and many other influent entities from all over Europe. The most famous signatories include Umberto Eco, Dario Fo, Daniel Goldhagen and many others.

Written Declaration n. 3/2012 was presented on 16 January 2012 by Hons. Gabriele Albertini, Lena Kolarska-Bobinska, Niccolò Rinaldi, David-Maria Sassoli and defines the aims of the European day of the Righteous in the following way:

The European Parliament ,

– having regard to Rule 123 of its Rules of Procedure,

A. recalling the great moral significance of the Garden of the Righteous in Jerusalem, initiated by the late Moshe Bejski, paying tribute to those who helped the Jews during the Holocaust;

B. recalling the institutions that have honoured people who saved lives during all genocides and mass murders (such as the Armenian, Bosnian, Cambodian and Rwandan ones) and the other crimes against humanity perpetrated in the 20th and 21st centuries;

C. recalling all those who preserved human dignity during Nazism and Communist totalitarianism;

D. whereas the remembrance of good is essential to the process of European integration because it teaches younger generations that everyone can always choose to help other human beings and defend human dignity, and that public institutions have a duty to highlight the example set by people who managed to protect those persecuted out of hate;

1. Supports the call made by leading citizens to establish a European Day of Remembrance for the Righteous to commemorate, on 6 March, those who challenged crimes against humanity and totalitarianism with individual responsibility;

2. Instructs its President to forward this declaration, together with the names of the signatories, to the High Representative of the Union for Foreign Affairs and Security Policy, the Commission, the Council and the parliaments of the Member States.

The European day of the Righteous was approved by the European Parliament on 10 May 2012 with 388 signatures.

== Celebrations ==
The activities related to the Righteous are supported at the international level by Gariwo, the forest of the Righteous, the Garden of the Righteous for the Armenians in Yerevan, the writer, founder of NGO Gariwo Sarajevo and activist for civil courage Svetlana Broz who is struggling to create a Garden of the Righteous in Sarajevo and such figures as the Righteous and witness to the Rwanda genocide Yolande Mukagasana.

=== 2012 ===
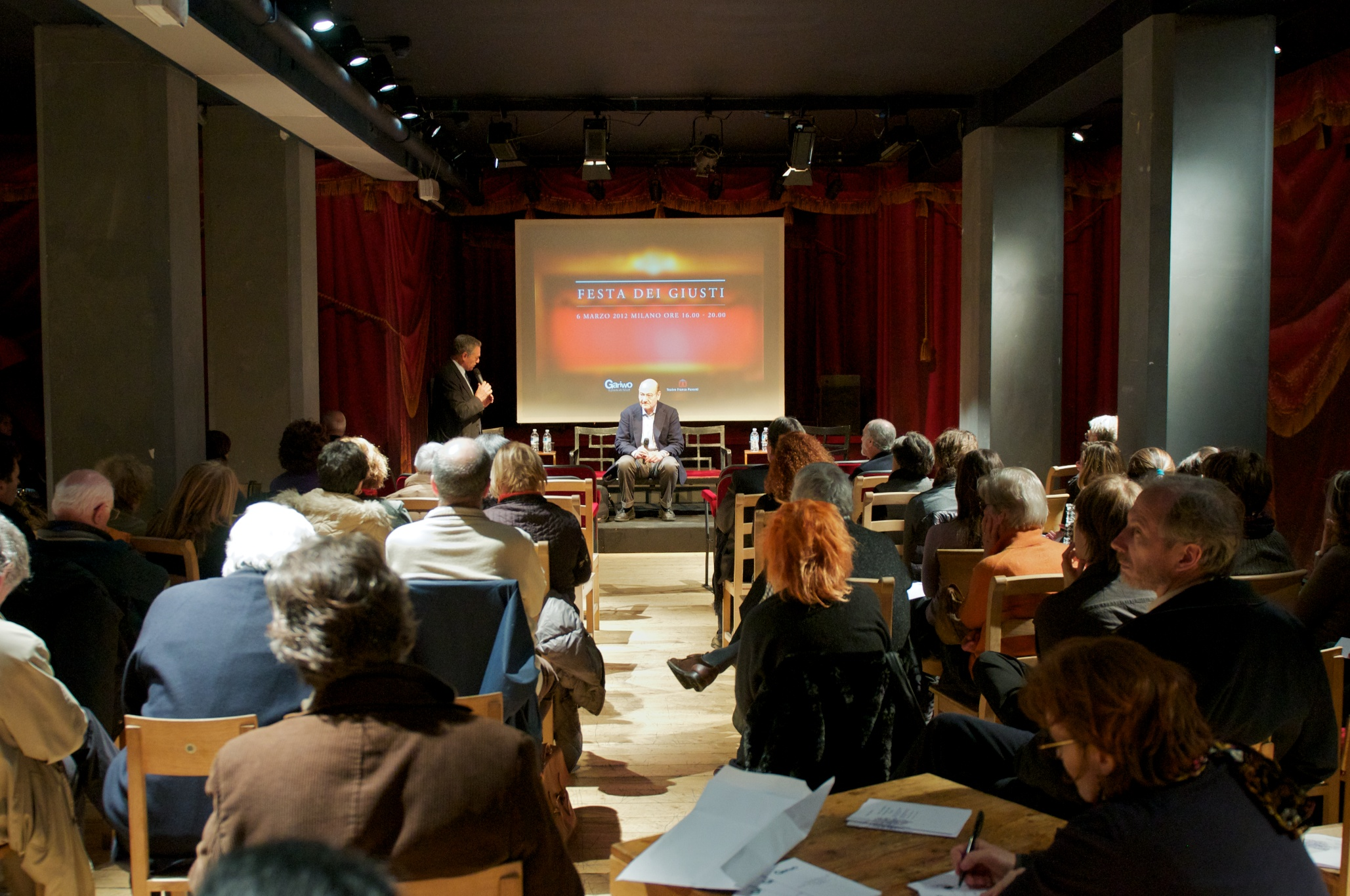
An instant of the Party for the Righteous at Teatro Franco Parenti in Milan

- The heritage of Václav Havel, Charter 77 and the European day of the Righteous on 8 February 2012 in Prague. Conference with such prestigious hosts as Milan Horáček, Czech-German politicians and former Member of the European Parliament, the signatory of Charter 77 and philosopher Daniel Kroupa, the member of the Charter Pavel Bratinka. Gabriele Nissim presented for the first time in the Czech Republic the secret documentary The youths of anti-politics about Havel and Charter 77 that he himself secretly shot in 1986 in Prague.
- The Party for the Righteous on 6 March 2012 at Teatro Franco Parenti of Milan in which the tales of the witnesses and the speeches by exponents of the worlds of culture and art alternated to the screening of footage and documentaries and the readings from Gabriele Nissim's recent book, La Bontà Insensata.
- Concert of the Righteous on 30 March 2012 in Warsaw. The concert, to which among others el the Italian Ambassador to Poland H.E. Riccardo Guariglia, former dissident Adam Michnik and actress Maja Komorowska have assisted, was performed by pianist Janusz Olejniczak playing music by Frédéric Chopin, and Gaetano Liguori.

=== 2013 ===
Milan, leader of the initiatives for the first European day of the Righteous, is an inspirational source for Europe and starts the celebrations which will also be held in Brussels, Warsaw, Prague, Sarajevo and St. Petersburg. Numerous are also the Italian town which have joined the event with their own initiatives, from Brescia to Padua, from Monza to Tolentino.

== Tree of the European day of the Righteous ==
As a graphic element for the initiatives of 6 March a tree has been created which is formed by the keywords of the day.

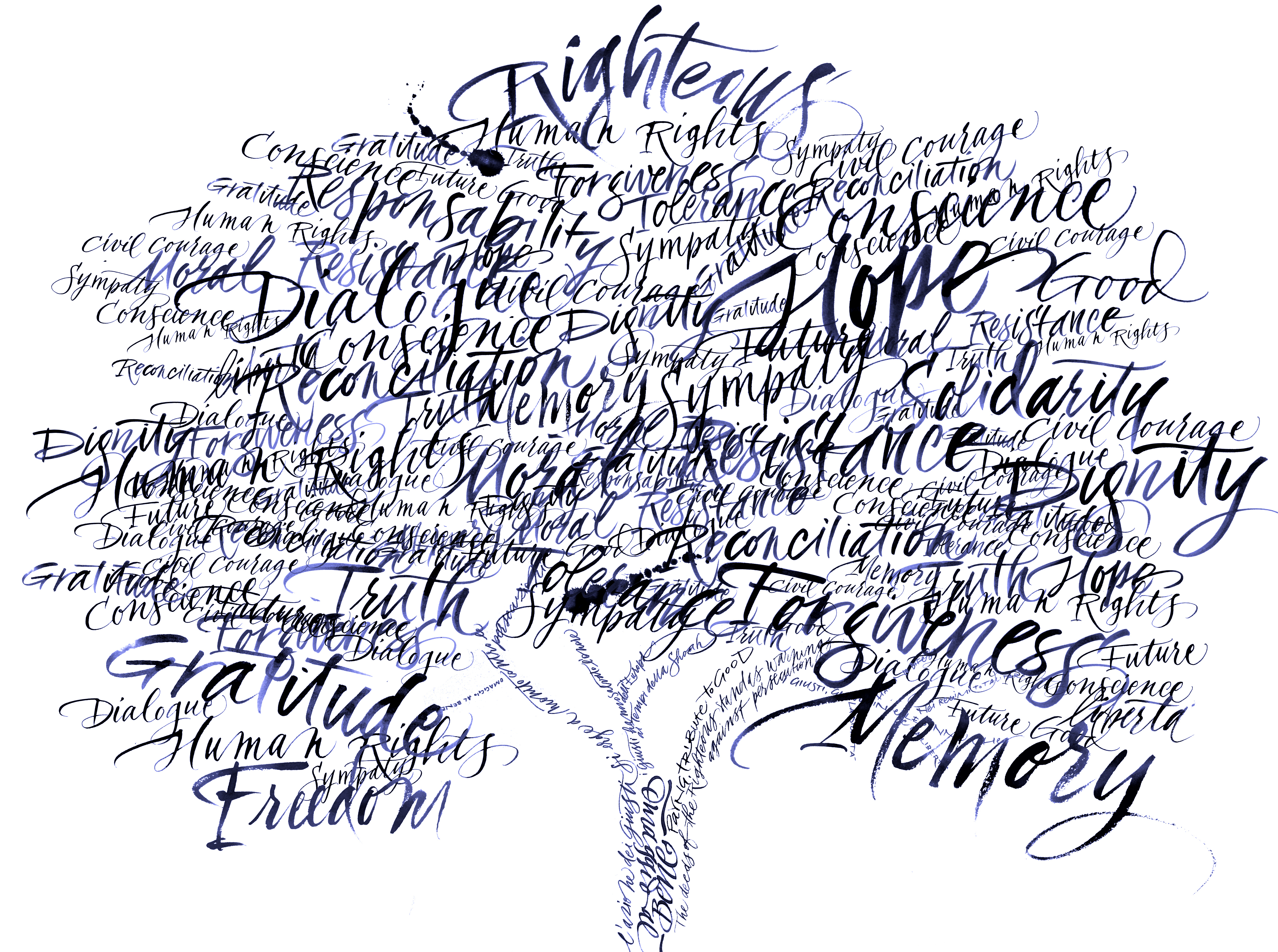
Tree of the Righteous

== See also ==
- Gabriele Nissim
- Moshe Bejski
- International Holocaust Remembrance Day
- Righteous Among the Nations
