= Graham Pink =

Nurse and whistleblower (1929–2021)

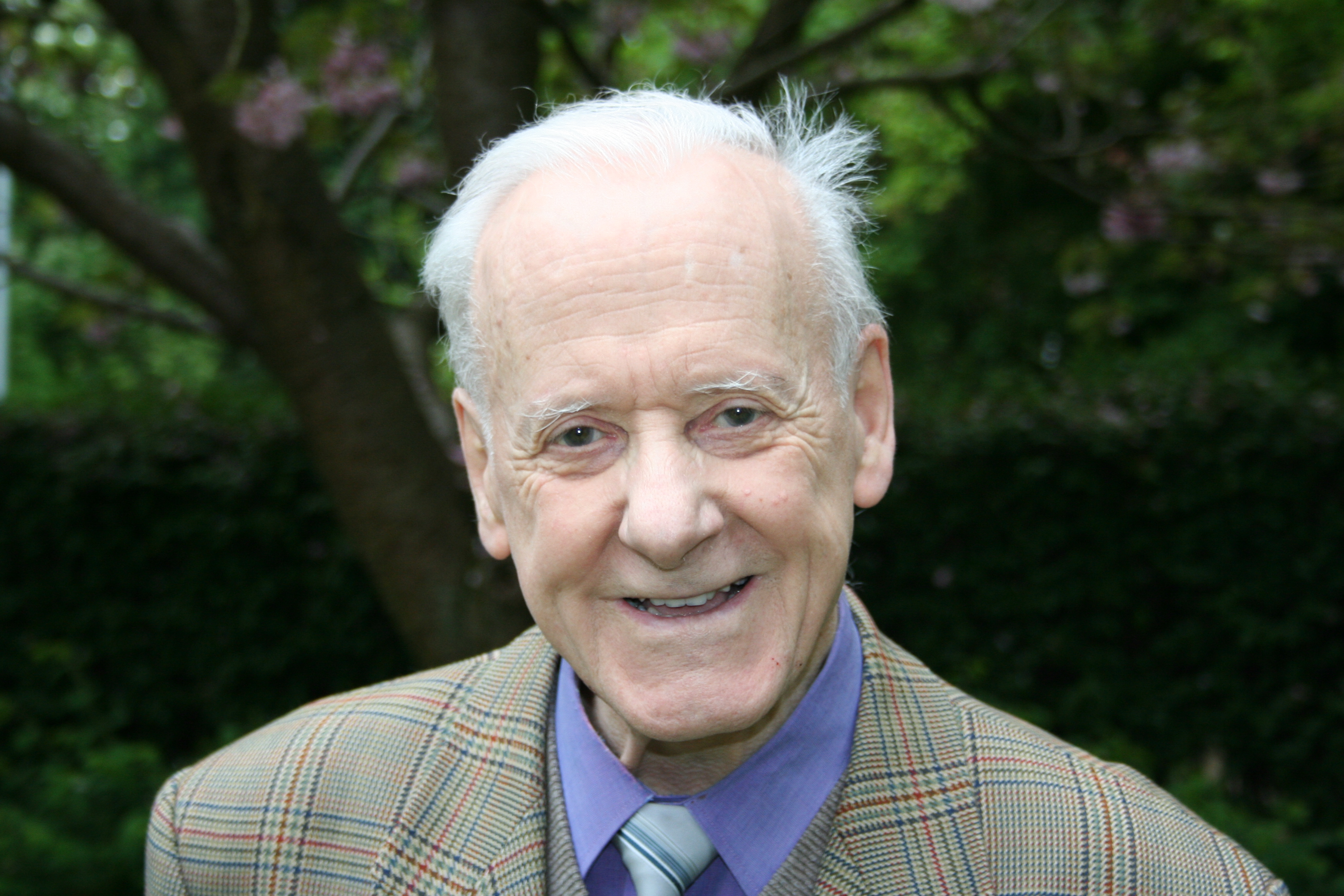
- Graham Pink, April 2009
- Born: 19 December 1929
- Died: 6 March 2021 (aged 91); Barnsley, South Yorkshire, England

Graham Pink (19 December 1929 – 6 March 2021) was a nurse and whistleblower at Stepping Hill Hospital in Stockport, Greater Manchester.

== Pink's complaints about inadequacies in medical standards ==
He worked in wards for elderly patients and complained about the poor standards of care resulting from insufficient staffing from 1989 to 1993. He also complained about the "inadequacies of his day-shift colleagues in failing to achieve his own perceived standards in such areas as filling in drug and nursing kardexes, [nursing records] and name bands, giving handover reports, washing medicine glasses and removing teacups from lockers at the end of a shift". It has been suggested that one result of his action may have been to undermine the confidence and trust of patients and that his campaign was misguided and political.

He was dismissed from his post, accused of breaching patients' confidentiality, when his letters of complaints to Andrew Bennett MP were published by the Guardian in 1990. His campaign became very public and he appeared in national newspapers and on television. He was successful at a subsequent Industrial Tribunal against Stockport Health Authority and was awarded £11,000, the maximum compensation for unfair dismissal at the time. The Health Authority withdrew from the tribunal claiming that the costs of an extended hearing would be exorbitant. The chairman claimed, "winning the case was never central to us. We needed to defend the golden rule of nursing: that of patient confidentiality."

His case was said to be part of the reason for the passing of the Public Interest Disclosure Act 1998.

== Death ==
Graham Pink died in Barnsley, South Yorkshire on 6 March 2021 after a long illness. He was aged 91 and was cared for by his family.

== Publications by Pink ==
- For Whom the Truth Hurts: Whistleblowing (Violations of Rights in Britain) (1992) (with Charter 88)
- A Time to Speak (Diary of an NHS Whistleblower) (2013). Memoir.
