= Rachel Pinker =

Professor of meteorology

- Education: Hebrew University, University of Maryland, College Park
- Scientific career
- Fields: Meteorology
- Workplaces: University of Maryland, College Park
- Thesis: Micrometeorological characteristics of a dry tropical evergreen forest in Thailand (1976)

Rachel T. Pinker is a professor of meteorology at the University of Maryland, College Park, where she has worked since 1976.

== Education ==
Pinker received her M.S. degree from Hebrew University in 1965 and her PhD from the University of Maryland, College Park in 1976.

== Research ==
Pinker is known for her research into global dimming and global brightening. She has said that the Earth seems to be getting brighter, and that this may be because of a combination of a clearer sky and fewer clouds.
