= List of members of the National Academy of Sciences (plant biology) =

This list is a subsection of the List of members of the National Academy of Sciences, which includes members and international members of the United States National Academy of Sciences, living and deceased, each affiliated with one of the academy's disciplinary sections. Members are listed under their primary section, and each entry gives the person's name, primary institution, and election year. For deceased members, the year of death is noted.

Name	Institution	Year
Henry N. Andrews (died 2002)	University of Connecticut	1975
William A. Arnold (died 2001)	Oak Ridge National Laboratory	1962
Eva-Mari Aro	University of Turku	2018
Frederick M. Ausubel	Harvard University	1994
Barbara Baker	USDA ARS Plant Gene Expression Center	2021
Ian T. Baldwin	Chinese Academy of Sciences	2013
Harlan P. Banks (died 1998)	Cornell University	1980
Elso Barghoorn (died 1984)	Harvard University	1967
David Baulcombe	University of Cambridge	2005
Harry Beevers (died 2004)	University of California, Santa Cruz	1969
Philip Benfey (died 2023)	Duke University	2010
Christoph Benning	Michigan State University	2025
Andrew Benson (died 2015)	University of California, San Diego	1973
Joy Bergelson	New York University	2018
Dominique Bergmann	Stanford University	2017
Olle Bjorkman (died 2021)	Carnegie Institution of Washington	1979
Lawrence R. Blinks (died 1989)	Stanford University	1955
Ralph Bock	Max Planck Institute of Molecular Plant Physiology	2023
Lawrence Bogorad (died 2003)	Harvard University	1971
Harold C. Bold (died 1987)	The University of Texas at Austin	1973
David M. Bonner (died 1964)	University of California, San Diego	1959
James F. Bonner (died 1996)	California Institute of Technology	1950
Armin C. Braun (died 1986)	The Rockefeller University	1960
Winslow Briggs (died 2019)	Carnegie Institution of Washington	1974
John Browse	Washington State University	2022
Bob Buchanan	University of California, Berkeley	1995
Erwin Bunning (died 1990)	Max Planck Institute for Biology	1968
Warren L. Butler (died 1984)	University of California, San Diego	1976
Xiaofeng Cao	Chinese Academy of Sciences	2020
Anthony Cashmore	University of Pennsylvania	2003
Clint Chapple	Purdue University	2022
Joanne Chory (died 2024)	Salk Institute for Biological Studies	1999
Maarten Chrispeels	University of California, San Diego	1996
Roderick Clayton (died 2011)	Cornell University	1977
Enrico Coen	John Innes Centre	2001
Eric Conn (died 2017)	University of California, Davis	1988
Gloria M. Coruzzi	New York University	2019
Daniel J. Cosgrove	Pennsylvania State University	2005
John Nathaniel Couch (died 1986)	University of North Carolina at Chapel Hill	1943
Rodney Croteau	Washington State University	1997
Jeffery Dangl	University of North Carolina at Chapel Hill	2007
Caroline Dean	John Innes Centre	2008
Xing-Wang Deng	Peking University	2013
David Dilcher (died 2026)	University of Florida	1989
John Doebley	University of Wisconsin–Madison	2002
Roland Douce (died 2018)	Universite de Grenoble	1997
Louis Duysens (died 2015)	Leiden University	1977
Joseph R. Ecker	Salk Institute for Biological Studies	2006
Ralph Emerson (died 1979)	University of California, Berkeley	1970
Emanuel Epstein (died 2022)	University of California, Davis	1978
Katherine Esau (died 1997)	University of California, Davis	1957
Mark Estelle	University of California, San Diego	2007
Harold J. Evans (died 2007)	Oregon State University	1972
Nina Fedoroff	Pennsylvania State University	1990
C. Stacy French (died 1995)	Carnegie Institution of Washington	1963
Albert Frey-Wyssling (died 1990)	ETH Zurich	1970
Elisabeth Gantt	University of Maryland, College Park	1996
Roger Gautheret (died 1997)	Academie des Sciences de l'Institut de France	1980
Martin Gibbs (died 2006)	Brandeis University	1974
David R. Goddard (died 1985)	University of Pennsylvania	1950
Susan Golden	University of California, San Diego	2010
Ursula W. Goodenough	Washington University in St. Louis	2023
Verne Grant (died 2007)	University of Texas at Austin	1968
Arthur R. Grossman	Carnegie Institution for Science	2024
C. Ake T. Gustafasson (died 1988)	Karolinska Institutet	1967
Klaus Hahlbrock	Max Planck Institute for Plant Breeding Research	1994
Maureen Hanson	Cornell University	2021
Robert Haselkorn (died 2025)	University of Chicago	1991
Marshall Hatch	Commonwealth Scientific and Industrial Research Organisation	1990
Charles Heiser Jr. (died 2010)	Indiana University	1987
Jack Heslop-Harrison (died 1998)	Aberystwyth University	1983
Robert Hill (died 1991)	University of Cambridge	1975
Gregg Alan Howe	Michigan State University	2020
Andre Jagendorf (died 2017)	Cornell University	1980
Shirley Jeffrey (died 2014)	Commonwealth Scientific and Industrial Research Organisation	2000
Hailing Jin	University of California, Riverside	2025
Pierre Joliot	French National Centre for Scientific Research	1979
Monty Patrick Jones	Forum for Agricultural Research in Africa	2006
Steve A. Kay	University of Southern California	2008
Patrick J. Keeling	University of British Columbia	2024
Elizabeth Anne Kellogg	Donald Danforth Plant Science Center	2020
Hans Kende (died 2006)	Michigan State University	1992
Joseph J. Kieber	University of North Carolina at Chapel Hill	2021
Eva Kondorosi	Hungarian Academy of Sciences	2010
Maarten Koornneef	Max Planck Institute for Plant Breeding Research	1998
Paul J. Kramer (died 1995)	Duke University	1962
J. Clark Lagarias	University of California, Davis	2001
Anton Lang (died 1996)	Michigan State University	1967
Ottoline Leyser	University of Cambridge	2012
Jiayang Li	Chinese Academy of Sciences	2011
Sharon R. Long	Stanford University	1993
Stephen P. Long (died 2025)	University of Illinois	2019
Jake MacMillan (died 2014)	University of Bristol	1991
Enid MacRobbie (died 2024)	University of Cambridge	1999
George Melchers (d.1997)	Max Planck Institute for Biology	1984
Sabeeha S. Merchant	University of California, Berkeley	2012
Elliot Meyerowitz	California Institute of Technology	1995
Jack Myers (died 2006)	University of Texas at Austin	1975
June Nasrallah	Cornell University	2003
Eldon Newcomb (died 2022)	University of Wisconsin–Madison	1988
Krishna K. Niyogi	University of California, Berkeley	2016
Giles Oldroyd	University of Cambridge	2021
Lindsay S. Olive (died 1988)	The University of North Carolina at Chapel Hill	1983
Winthrop Osterhout (died 1964)	Harvard University	1919
Jeffrey Palmer	Indiana University	2000
William Peacock (died 2025)	Commonwealth Scientific and Industrial Research Organisation	1990
Tom Phillips (died 2018)	University of Illinois at Urbana–Champaign	1999
Bernard Phinney (died 2009)	University of California, Los Angeles	1985
R. Scott Poethig	University of Pennsylvania	2014
Michael D. Purugganan	New York University	2024
Peter Quail	University of California, Berkeley	2004
Natasha V. Raikhel	University of California, Riverside	2012
Kenneth B. Raper (died 1987)	University of Wisconsin-Madison	1949
Loren H. Rieseberg	University of British Columbia	2020
Reed C. Rollins (died 1998)	Harvard University	1972
Eugenia (Jenny) Russinova	Ghent University	2022
Clarence A. Ryan (died 2007)	Washington State University	1986
Jozef Schell (died 2003)	Max Planck Institute for Plant Breeding Research	1985
Julian I. Schroeder	University of California, San Diego	2015
Folke Skoog (died 2001)	University of Wisconsin-Madison	1956
Albert Charles Smith (died 1999)	University of Hawaii at Manoa	1963
Douglas E. Soltis	University of Florida	2017
Pamela S. Soltis	University of Florida	2016
Christopher Somerville	Carnegie Institution of Washington	1996
Adrian M. Srb (died 1997)	Cornell University	1968
Richard C. Starr (died 1998)	The University of Texas at Austin	1976
Paul Stumpf (died 2007)	University of California, Davis	1978
Tai-ping Sun	Duke University	2024
Venkatesan Sundaresan	University of California, Davis	2023
Armen Takhtajan (died 2009)	Russian Academy of Sciences	1971
Steven Tanksley	Cornell University	1995
Thomas N. Taylor	University of Kansas	1994
Athanasios Theologis	USDA ARS Plant Gene Expression Center	2011
Kenneth V. Thimann (died 1997)	University of Pennsylvania	1948
N. Edward Tolbert (died 1998)	Michigan State University	1984
Keiko U. Torii	University of Texas at Austin	2024
John G. Torrey (died 1993)	Harvard University	1981
Yi-Fang Tsay	Academia Sinica	2021
Marc Van Montagu	Ghent University	1986
Cornelis Bernardus van Niel (died 1985)	Hopkins Marine Station	1945
Joseph E. Varner (died 1995)	Washington University in St. Louis	1984
Richard D. Vierstra	Washington University in St. Louis	2018
Diter von Wettstein (died 2017)	Washington State University	1981
Detlef Weigel	Max Planck Institute for Biology Tübingen	2009
Jonathan F. Wendel	Iowa State University	2023
F. W. Went (died 1990)	University of Nevada, Reno	1947
Ralph H. Wetmore (died 1989)	Harvard University	1954
Robert H. Whittaker (died 1980)	Cornell University	1975
Shang Fa Yang (died 2007)	University of California, Davis	1990
Longping Yuan (died 2021)	Hunan Hybrid Rice Research Center	2006
Patricia Zambryski	University of California, Berkeley	2001
Jan Zeevaart (died 2009)	Michigan State University	1998
Meinhart Zenk (died 2011)	Universitat Halle	1992
