= Jennifer Nemhauser =

American biologist

Jennifer Lyn Nemhauser
- Education: University of Washington; Wellesley College; Salk Institute
- Scientific career
- Workplaces: Whitehead Institute; University of Washington
- Thesis: ETTIN and auxin in Arabidopsis gynoecium development (2000)
- Doctoral advisor: Patricia Zambryski

Jennifer Lyn Nemhauser is an American biologist and a Professor of Developmental Biology at the University of Washington in Seattle, Washington. She specializes in synthetic biology, genomics, and signaling dynamics in plants.

== Early life and education ==
Nemhauser was an undergraduate student at Wellesley College, where she majored in biological sciences. Her honors thesis considered the Arabidopsis thaliana Linoleate 9S-lipoxygenase (LOX1) promoter. After graduating, Nemhauser worked as a research assistant at the Whitehead Institute. She was a doctoral researcher in the group of Patricia Zambryski at the University of California, Berkeley. She moved to the Salk Institute for Biological Studies for her postdoctoral studies, where she worked in the laboratory of Joanne Chory. During her postdoctoral research she was first introduced to genomics, where she began to use genomic tools to better understand plant hormone signaling.

== Research and career ==
In 2006, Nemhauser moved to Seattle, where she joined the University of Washington. Her research combines molecular genetics and synthetic biology. Primarily, Nemhauser looks to understand how the regulation of cellular function (e.g. division, differentiation and communication) allows for multi-cellular life. She develops novel tools to investigate the signaling dynamics of plants, including the transmission of the plant hormone auxin. Her data on auxins has been used as an example in an introductory biology textbook showing regulation of growth in plants. Nemhauser has extensively studied the model plant Arabidopsis thaliana to understand how seedlings adapt to their environments and how seedlings respond to light.

== Select publications ==
- Nemhauser, Jennifer L.; Hong, Fangxin; Chory, Joanne (2006-08-11). "Different Plant Hormones Regulate Similar Processes through Largely Nonoverlapping Transcriptional Responses". Cell. 126 (3): 467–475. doi:10.1016/j.cell.2006.05.050. ISSN 0092-8674. PMID 16901781. S2CID 14877520.
- Hong, Fangxin; Breitling, Rainer; McEntee, Connor W.; Wittner, Ben S.; Nemhauser, Jennifer L.; Chory, Joanne (2006-11-15). "RankProd: a bioconductor package for detecting differentially expressed genes in meta-analysis". Bioinformatics. 22 (22): 2825–2827. doi:10.1093/bioinformatics/btl476. hdl:11370/4c61797b-1a2b-44f6-ae78-21585337eeab. ISSN 1460-2059. PMID 16982708.
- Nemhauser, Jennifer L.; Mockler, Todd C.; Chory, Joanne (2004-08-24). "Interdependency of Brassinosteroid and Auxin Signaling in Arabidopsis". PLOS Biology. 2 (9): e258. doi:10.1371/journal.pbio.0020258. ISSN 1545-7885. PMC 509407. PMID 15328536.

== Personal life ==
Nemhauser is also an active supporter of the arts. She sees art as a medium that helps scientists connect with the public. With funding from the NSF, Nemhauser brings local artists into her lab to produce art inspired by work in the laboratory. In 2016, artist Claire Cowie spent three months in Nemhauser's lab shadowing scientists and learning their stories. "Terminology I" is one of Cowie's works inspired by her residency in the lab. Extending beyond the lab, Nemhauser and her partner (Seattle painter Matthew Offenbacher) purchased seven works of art and donated them to the Seattle Art Museum, using Offenbacher's winnings from the 2015 Neddy Artist awards, stewarded by Cornish College. Nemhauser is also a member of 500 Queer Scientists and has described herself as being bi/pansexual.
