= List of Sigma Phi Epsilon chapters =

Sigma Phi Epsilon is an American social college fraternity. It was founded on November 1, 1901, at Richmond College, which is now the University of Richmond. It absorbed Theta Upsilon Omega fraternity in 1938. In the following list, active chapters are indicated in bold and inactive chapters and institutions are in italics.

Roll #	Chapter	Charter date and range	Institution	Location	Status	Ref.
1	**Virginia Alpha**	November 1, 1901 – 1997; 2001	University of Richmond	Richmond, Virginia	Active	(Note: The chapter formed from the Saturday Night Club, established in 1901. The university suspended the chapter for hazing in 2024.)
2	Virginia Beta	October 30, 1902 – 1905; 1971–1993; 2013–2025	Virginia Commonwealth University	Richmond, Virginia	Inactive	(Note: Chapter formed from Phi Iota Sigma (local), established in 1901. After dormancy, it was re-established from Phi Delta Omega in 1968.)
3	Pennsylvania Alpha	November 28, 1902 – 1907	Washington & Jefferson College	Washington, Pennsylvania	Inactive	(Note: See references to Sigma Phi Epsilon on the institution page)
4	Virginia Gamma	February 20, 1903 – 1905	Roanoke College	Salem, Virginia	Inactive	
5	West Virginia Alpha	March 23, 1903 – 1905	Bethany College	Bethany, West Virginia	Inactive	
6	West Virginia Beta	March 25, 1903 – 2006; 2016 – October 2019	West Virginia University	Morgantown, West Virginia	Inactive	(Note: The national fraternity revoked the chapter's charter in 2019 for repeated violation of the law and university policies.)
7	Pennsylvania Beta	September 23, 1903 – 1911	Jefferson Medical College	Philadelphia, Pennsylvania	Inactive	
8	**Pennsylvania Gamma**	December 12, 1903 – 1912; 1949–1964; 1990	University of Pittsburgh	Pittsburgh, Pennsylvania	Active	
9	**Illinois Alpha**	December 18, 1903 – 1912; 1917–1996; 2001–2020	University of Illinois Urbana-Champaign	Champaign, Illinois	Active	(Note: After going dormant, the chapter was reformed from Psi Delta, established in 1912. It absorbed the Delta Alpha chapter of Theta Upsilon Omega with the national merger of the two fraternities in 1938.)
10	**Colorado Alpha**	February 19, 1904 – 1994; 2007–2022; 2025	University of Colorado Boulder	Boulder, Colorado	Active	
11	**Pennsylvania Delta**	March 24, 1904	University of Pennsylvania	Philadelphia, Pennsylvania	Active	(Note: Chapter formed from Omega Pi Alpha, established in 1903.)
12	**South Carolina Alpha**	May 2, 1904 – 1906; 1929–1938; 1951 – December 12, 2011; 2013	University of South Carolina	Columbia, South Carolina	Active	(Note: In 2011, the university suspended the chapter from campus for five years for underage drinking. The national fraternity then revoked the chapter's charter.)
13	**Virginia Delta**	June 11, 1904 – 1938; 1961–2004; 2015	College of William & Mary	Williamsburg, Virginia	Active	
14	**Ohio Alpha**	February 18, 1905	Ohio Northern University	Ada, Ohio	Active	(Note: Chapter formed from Theta Nu Epsilon, established in 1903.)
15	**North Carolina Beta**	March 4, 1905 – 2004; 2011	North Carolina State University	Raleigh, North Carolina	Active	
16	Ohio Beta	March 21, 1905 – 1907	Wittenberg University	Springfield, Ohio	Inactive	
17	**Indiana Alpha**	March 24, 1905 – March 12, 2016	Purdue University	West Lafayette, Indiana	Colony	(Note: Chapter formed from the Green Dragon Club, established in 1903. The national office of Sigma Phi Epsilon and Purdue suspended the chapter from March 2016 until the fall semester of 2020, after violating a four-year probation set in 2013. The chapter was re-established as a colony in 2019.)
18	New York Alpha	December 21, 1905 – 1995; 2005 – January 31, 2024	Syracuse University	Syracuse, New York	Inactive	(Note: Chapter formed from the Adelphian Society, established in 1904. It was suspended by the national fraternity in 2024 for student conduct violations.)
19	Virginia Epsilon	March 30, 1906 – 1940; 1960–2002	Washington and Lee University	Lexington, Virginia	Inactive	(Note: After going dormant, the chapter was revived by absorbing the Colonnade Club, established in 1958. Its charter was revoked in 2002.)
20	**Virginia Zeta**	December 20, 1906 – 1991; 2012	Randolph–Macon College	Ashland, Virginia	Active	(Note: Chapter formed from the Midnight Marauders, established in 1905.)
21	**Georgia Alpha**	April 1, 1907	Georgia Tech	Atlanta, Georgia	Active	(Note: Chapter formed from Georgia Tech Social Club, established in 1906.)
22	**Virginia Eta**	April 27, 1907 – 2009; 2019	University of Virginia	Charlottesville, Virginia	Active	
23	**Delaware Alpha**	April 29, 1907 – 1981; 1985–2002; 2005	University of Delaware	Newark, Delaware	Active	(Note: Chapter formed from Delta Chi (local), established in 1905.)
24	**Arkansas Alpha**	September 16, 1907 – 1938; 1948–1996; 2000	University of Arkansas	Fayetteville, Arkansas	Active	(Note: Chapter formed from Alpha Zeta Phi (local), established in 1900.)
25	**Pennsylvania Epsilon**	September 19, 1907 – 1991; 1996	Lehigh University	Bethlehem, Pennsylvania	Active	(Note: Chapter formed from Omega Pi Alpha (local), established in 1903.)
26	Virginia Theta	January 25, 1908 – 1912	Virginia Military Institute	Lexington, Virginia	Inactive	
27	**Ohio Gamma**	January 30, 1908 – 1999; 2002	Ohio State University	Columbus, Ohio	Active	
28	Vermont Alpha	March 18, 1908 – 1959	Norwich University	Northfield, Vermont	Inactive	(Note: Chapter formed from Delta Kappa Phi, established in 1906.)
29	Pennsylvania Zeta	October 17, 1908 – 1909	Allegheny College	Meadville, Pennsylvania	Inactive	(Note: Chapter formed from Theta Delta Psi, established in 1904.)
30	**Alabama Alpha**	November 7, 1908 – November 10, 2017; July 8, 2026	Auburn University	Auburn, Alabama	Active	(Note: Chapter formed from D. P. Club, established in 1908. It absorbed the Eta Beta chapter of Theta Upsilon Omega with the national merger of the two fraternities in 1938. In 2017, the national fraternity revoked the chapter's charter "after an investigation into allegations of hazing, drug use, and alcohol violations".) (Note: Alabama Alpha returned to campus ahead of the Fall 2026 semester after having their charter revoked for allegations of hazing, drug use, and alcohol violations.)
31	North Carolina Gamma	March 27, 1909 – 1960; 1968–1993; 2001–2021	Duke University	Durham, North Carolina	Inactive	(Note: Chapter formed from Beta Nu, established in 1908. In the fall of 1993, Duke dissolved the chapter for behavior issues. After reforming, the national fraternity revoked the chapter's charter in 2021.)
32	**New Hampshire Alpha**	April 24, 1909 – 1967; 1981–2018	Dartmouth College	Hanover, New Hampshire	Colony	(Note: Chapter formed from Omega Pi Sigma, established in 1908. After dormancy, it was reformed in 1981 by Sigma Theta Epsilon, which was established in 1967. The national fraternity revoked its charter in 2018 for repeated alcohol violations. The chapter was re-established in 2022 as a colony.)
33	D.C. Alpha	October 9, 1909 – 1993; 2001 – July 2016	George Washington University	Washington, D.C.	Inactive	(Note: Chapter formed from Kappa Sigma Pi, established in 1906. Later, it absorbed the Eta Alpha chapter of Theta Upsilon Omega in the national merger of the two fraternities. The national fraternity revoked the chapter's charter in 2016 after the university placed the fraternity on disciplinary probation.)
34	**Kansas Alpha**	April 2, 1910	Baker University	Baldwin City, Kansas	Active	(Note: Chapter formed from Phi Sigma Phi, established in 1905.)
35	**California Alpha**	November 10, 1910 – 1972; 1984–2002; 2006–2019	University of California, Berkeley	Berkeley, California	Colony	(Note: 1Chapter formed from the Palomar Club, established in 1905. It absorbed the Gamma Beta chapter of Theta Upsilon Omega with the national merger of the two fraternities in 1938.) (Note: The chapter closed during a rape investigation in 2019. It reformed in the fall of 2024 as a colony.)
36	**Nebraska Alpha**	April 15, 1911	University of Nebraska–Lincoln	Lincoln, Nebraska	Active	(Note: Chapter formed from Kappa Tau Epsilon, established in 1909.)
37	**Washington Alpha**	March 2, 1912 – 2002; 2009	Washington State University	Pullman, Washington	Active	(Note: Chapter formed from Beta Alpha, established in 1909.)
38	**Massachusetts Alpha**	April 27, 1912	University of Massachusetts Amherst	Amherst, Massachusetts	Active	(Note: Chapter formed from Sigma Tau Delta, established in 1909.)
39	Ohio Delta	June 1, 1912 – 1913	College of Wooster	Wooster, Ohio	Inactive	(Note: Chapter formed from Theta Delta Sigma, established in 1910. Fraternities and sororities were banned at Wooster in 1913.)
40	New York Beta	September 24, 1912 – 2005; 2010–2019	Cornell University	Ithaca, New York	Inactive	(Note: Chapter formed from Theta Lambda Phi, established in 1907. The university withdrew its recognition of the chapter in 2019 for hazing.)
41	Rhode Island Alpha	November 27, 1912 – 1919	Brown University	Providence, Rhode Island	Inactive	(Note: Chapter formed from Pi Delta Sigma, established in 1910.)
42	**Michigan Alpha**	December 14, 1912 – 1994; xxxx ?–2018	University of Michigan	Ann Arbor, Michigan	Colony	(Note: Chapter formed from the Keystone Club, established in 1905. In 1994, the chapter returned its charter to the national fraternity after receiving sanctions from the university for hazing It reformed as a colony in the fall of 2023.)
43	Iowa Alpha	February 1, 1913 – 1976	Iowa Wesleyan College	Mount Pleasant, Iowa	Inactive	(Note: Chapter formed from Sigma Kappa Zeta, established in 1912.)
44	Colorado Beta	May 21, 1913 – 1973; 1991–1994	University of Denver	Denver, Colorado	Inactive	(Note: Chapter formed from Gamma Sigma Tau, established in 1906.)
45	Tennessee Alpha	May 29, 1913 – March 24, 2023	University of Tennessee	Knoxville, Tennessee	Inactive	(Note: Chapter formed from Phi Alpha Phi (local), established in 1911. It was suspended in May 2023 due to repeated conduct violations until spring 2027.)
46	**Missouri Alpha**	April 10, 1914 – 2017; 2023	University of Missouri	Columbia, Missouri	Active	(Note: Chapter formed from Delta Omicron (local), established in 1912. The national fraternity closed the chapter in 2019 for violating the university's conduct code.)
47	**Wisconsin Alpha**	February 27, 1915 – 1976; 1980	Lawrence University	Appleton, Wisconsin	Active	(Note: Chapter formed from Sigma Tau Nu, established in 1909.)
48	**Pennsylvania Eta**	May 8, 1915	Pennsylvania State University	State College, Pennsylvania	Active	(Note: Chapter formed from Sigma Tau, established in 1911.)
49	**Ohio Epsilon**	November 20, 1915	Ohio Wesleyan University	Delaware, Ohio	Active	(Note: Chapter formed from Kappa Epsilon Alpha, established in 1913.)
50	**Colorado Gamma**	November 27, 1915 – December 29, 2013; 2023	Colorado State University	Fort Collins, Colorado	Active	(Note: Chapter formed from Tau Alpha (local), established in 1905. In 2014, the chapter lost university recognition for violating its code of conduct five times in two years. In response, the national fraternity terminated the chapter.)
51	**Minnesota Alpha**	April 15, 1916 – 1941; 1949–1958; 1979	University of Minnesota	Minneapolis, Minnesota	Active	(Note: Chapter formed from Chi Rho Theta (local), established in 1907.)
52	**Iowa Beta**	April 20, 1916	Iowa State University	Ames, Iowa	Active	(Note: Chapter formed from Kappa Kappa Kappa (local), established on December 20, 1910.)
53	**Iowa Gamma**	April 27, 1917	University of Iowa	Iowa City, Iowa	Active	(Note: Chapter formed from the Cosmos Club (local), established in 1915.)
54	Montana Alpha	February 2, 1918 – 1942; 1943–2023	University of Montana	Missoula, Montana	Inactive	(Note: Chapter formed from Alpha Gamma Phi, established on February 21, 1916 as an outgrowth of the Authentic Society which was formed in 1913. The chapter closed in 1942 due to World War II, when most of its members enlisted.)
55	**Oregon Alpha**	February 9, 1918	Oregon State University	Corvallis, Oregon	Active	(Note: Chapter formed from the Oxford Club, established in 1911.)
56	**Kansas Beta**	February 23, 1918	Kansas State University	Manhattan, Kansas	Active	(Note: Chapter formed from Epsilon Epsilon Epsilon (local), established in 1915.)
57	**Oklahoma Alpha**	April 3, 1920	Oklahoma State University	Stillwater, Oklahoma	Active	(Note: Chapter formed from Sigma Tau, established in 1916.)
58	**Wisconsin Beta**	November 13, 1920 – October 4, 2016; August, 2024	University of Wisconsin–Madison	Madison, Wisconsin	Colony	(Note: Chapter formed from the Awema Club, established in 1905. The university suspended the chapter for five years in 2016 for violating the terms of a prior suspension)
59	North Carolina Delta	February 26, 1921 – 1939; 1947–2020		Chapel Hill, North Carolina	Inactive	(Note: Chapter formed from Theta Sigma Phi, established in 1919.)
60	**Washington Beta**	January 14, 1922	University of Washington	Seattle, Washington	Active	(Note: Chapter formed from Gamma Sigma, established in 1920.)
61	**Colorado Delta**	April 21, 1923	Colorado School of Mines	Golden, Colorado	Active	(Note: Chapter formed from the Minen Club, established in 1920.)
62	**Kansas Gamma**	April 28, 1923	University of Kansas	Lawrence, Kansas	Active	(Note: Chapter formed from Acomnas Club, established in 1914.)
63	**Florida Alpha**	March 28, 1925 – 2012; 2018	University of Florida	Gainesville, Florida	Active	
64	Vermont Beta	May 16, 1925 – 1960; 1983–1990	Middlebury College	Middlebury, Vermont	Inactive	(Note: Chapter formed from Sigma Phi Iota, established in 1922. After dormancy, it reformed in 1983 from Sigma Epsilon (local), established in 1960.)
65	**Pennsylvania Theta**	October 10, 1925 – 1937; 1998	Carnegie Mellon University	Pittsburgh, Pennsylvania	Active	(Note: Chapter formed from Sigma Epsilon Phi, established in 1920.)
66	**Oregon Beta**	May 20, 1926 – 2020; 2023	University of Oregon	Eugene, Oregon	Active	(Note: Chapter formed from Kappa Delta Phi, established in 1922.)
67	**Alabama Beta**	December 14, 1927 – November 24, 2008; 2015	University of Alabama	Tuscaloosa, Alabama	Active	(Note: Chapter formed from Delta Sigma Epsilon, established in 1923. Its charter was removed in 2008 for "failure to comply with policies regarding new member programming.")
68	Mississippi Alpha	June 2, 1928 – 1952; 1955–1976; 1988 – April 17, 2014	University of Mississippi	Oxford, Mississippi	Inactive	(Note: Chapter formed from Phi Epsilon, established in 1927. Its charter was removed due to hazing, underage drinking, and placing a noose around the neck of a statue of James Meredith, the first African-American student at the university.)
69	California Beta	June 9, 1928 – 2013	University of Southern California	Los Angeles, California	Inactive	(Note: Chapter formed from Alpha Sigma Delta, established in 1923. In 2013, it was banned by the university and expelled from the national fraternity following reports of sexual misconduct.)
70	**Missouri Beta**	April 6, 1929 – 1941; 1949–1971; 1983–2012; 2022	Washington University in St. Louis	St. Louis, Missouri	Active	(Note: Chapter formed from Psi Delta, established in 1919.)
71	New Mexico Alpha	April 13, 1929 – May 19, 2007	University of New Mexico	Albuquerque, New Mexico	Inactive	(Note: Chapter formed from Coronado Club, established in 1923. The national fraternity withdrew its charter in 2007.)
72	Louisiana Alpha	April 20, 1929 – 1941; 1990–2018	Tulane University	New Orleans, Louisiana	Inactive	(Note: The chapter was closed in 2018 for various violations of university policies.)
73	Maryland Alpha	June 15, 1929 – 1987; 1989 – January 27, 2021	Johns Hopkins University	Baltimore, Maryland	Inactive	(Note: Chapter formed from Delta Gamma Theta, established in 1921. After going dormant, it was revived by absorbing Sigma Chi Omega, established in 1987. In 2021, the university banned the chapter for four years for violations of university policies.)
74	North Carolina Epsilon	April 15, 1930 – February 2024	Davidson College	Davidson, North Carolina	Inactive	(Note: Chapter formed from the Pyramid Club, established in 1923. The university suspended the chapter for five years in February 2024 for hazing in the spring of 2023.)
75	Alabama Gamma	April 16, 1930 – 1935; 1949–1950; 1997–2009	Samford University	Homewood, Alabama	Inactive	(Note: Chapter formed from Sigma Delta Chi, established in 1924.)
76	**Texas Alpha**	May 24, 1930	University of Texas at Austin	Austin, Texas	Active	(Note: Chapter formed from Sigma Eta Chi, established in 1924.)
77	**New York Gamma**	June 7, 1930 – 1970; 1980	New York University	New York City, New York	Active	(Note: Chapter formed from Theta Sigma Phi, established in 1923.)
78	**Indiana Beta**	June 6, 1931 – 1938; 1947–2002; 2007	Indiana University Bloomington	Bloomington, Indiana	Active	(Note: Chapter formed from Delta Phi Sigma, established in 1928.)
79	**Kentucky Alpha**	March 4, 1933 – 1989; 1994–2009; 2015	University of Kentucky	Lexington, Kentucky	Active	(Note: Chapter formed from Sigma Beta Xi, established in 1922.)
80	**Utah Alpha**	March 21, 1936 – 1997; 2010	Utah State University	Logan, Utah	Active	(Note: Chapter formed from Alpha Delta Epsilon, established in 1915.)
81	**Massachusetts Beta**	April 3, 1938	Worcester Polytechnic Institute	Worcester, Massachusetts	Active	(Note: Chapter formed from the Beta Alpha chapter of Theta Upsilon Omega as part of the national merger of the two fraternities.)
82	Pennsylvania Iota	April 10, 1938 – 2017	Muhlenberg College	Allentown, Pennsylvania	Inactive	(Note: Chapter formed from the Delta Beta chapter of Theta Upsilon Omega after the national merger of the two fraternities.)
83	**New York Delta**	April 23, 1938	Rensselaer Polytechnic Institute	Troy, New York	Active	(Note: Chapter formed from Theta Upsilon Omega, established in 1933.)
84	**Mississippi Beta**	April 30, 1938 – 2014; 2021	Mississippi State University	Mississippi State, Mississippi	Active	(Note: Chapter formed from Sigma Phi, established in 1937.)
85	**Pennsylvania Kappa**	April 30, 1938	Bucknell University	Lewisburg, Pennsylvania	Active	(Note: Chapter formed from the Zeta Alpha chapter of Theta Upsilon Omega, established in 1924.)
86	**Pennsylvania Lambda**	April 30, 1938	Westminster College	New Wilmington, Pennsylvania	Active	(Note: Chapter formed from the Lambda Alpha chapter of Theta Upsilon Omega, established in 1924.)
87	Pennsylvania Mu	May 7, 1938 – 1972; 1990 – July 25, 2005	Temple University	Philadelphia, Pennsylvania	Inactive	(Note: Chapter formed from the Epsilon Alpha chapter of Theta Upsilon Omega, established in 1924. The university suspended the chapter in the fall of 2005 for hazing. The national fraternity then removed the chapter's charter for risk management and behavioral problems.)
88	**New Jersey Alpha**	May 7, 1938 – 2002; 2007	Stevens Institute of Technology	Hoboken, New Jersey	Active	(Note: Chapter formed from Theta Upsilon Omega, established in 1924.)
89	North Carolina Zeta	May 19, 1940 – April 2002	Wake Forest University	Winston-Salem, North Carolina	Inactive	(Note: Chapter formed from the Delta chapter of Chi Tau fraternity, established in 1923. Its charter was revoked in 2002 after misdemeanor citations for abandonment of a pig, following a party. It was reformed as a colony but the national fraternity closed the colony on May 23, 2017, for hazing, serving alcohol to underaged students, and unsatisfactory academic performance. The university also withdrew its recognition of the colony.)
90	Wisconsin Gamma	December 1, 1940 – 1983	Carroll College	Waukesha, Wisconsin	Inactive	(Note: Chapter formed from Gamma Phi Delta, established in 1912.)
91	**Wyoming Alpha**	May 1, 1943 – 1963; 1995	University of Wyoming	Laramie, Wyoming	Active	(Note: Chapter formed from Lambda Tau Delta, established in 1927.)
92	**New Jersey Beta**	January 15, 1944 – 2015; 2025	Rutgers University	New Brunswick, New Jersey	Active	(Note: Chapter formed from the Raritan Club, established in 1921. The national fraternity closed it after the university suspended the chapter for an incident resulting in a member being hospitalized for alcohol consumption. The chapter was re-established as a colony in 2022.)
93	Oklahoma Gamma	May 26, 1946 – 1959	University of Tulsa	Tulsa, Oklahoma	Inactive	
94	**Oklahoma Beta**	June 1, 1946	University of Oklahoma	Norman, Oklahoma	Active	(Note: Chapter formed from Phi Epsilon, established in 1946.)
95	**Missouri Gamma**	May 10, 1947	Missouri University of Science and Technology	Rolla, Missouri	Active	(Note: Chapter formed from the Pegis Club, established in 1946.)
96	**Kentucky Beta**	May 17, 1947 – 1958; 1978	University of Louisville	Louisville, Kentucky	Active	(Note: Chapter formed from Delta Sigma, established in 1919. After going dormant, it was reformed from Delta Beta chapter of Theta Tau, established in 1939.)
97	**California Gamma**	June 15, 1947 – 1972; 1979	University of California, Santa Barbara	Santa Barbara, California	Active	
98	**California Delta**	November 16, 1947 – 1997; 2004	San Diego State University	San Diego, California	Active	(Note: Chapter formed from Sigma Delta Epsilon, established in 1940.)
99	**West Virginia Gamma**	December 6, 1947	Marshall University	Huntington, West Virginia	Active	(Note: Chapter formed from Alpha Theta Chi, established in 1926.)
100	**Ohio Zeta**	March 13, 1948	Baldwin-Wallace College	Berea, Ohio	Active	(Note: Chapter formed from the Barbarian Club, established in 1937.)
101	**Illinois Beta**	May 9, 1948 – 2013; 2020	Illinois Institute of Technology	Chicago, Illinois	Active	(Note: Chapter formed from the Pegis Club, established in 1947. The national fraternity withdrew the chapter's charter in 2013. It was successfully re-chartered in 2020.)
102	**Iowa Delta**	May 9, 1948 – 1996; 2002	Drake University	Des Moines, Iowa	Active	(Note: Chapter formed from Chi Delta, established in 1901.)
103	**Illinois Gamma**	May 22, 1948	Monmouth College	Monmouth, Illinois	Active	
104	**Maine Alpha**	May 30, 1948 – 1994; May 4, 2002	University of Maine	Orono, Maine	Active	(Note: Chapter formed from Theta Rho, established in 1947.)
105	**Pennsylvania Nu**	November 12, 1948	Thiel College	Greenville, Pennsylvania	Active	(Note: Chapter formed from Alpha Iota Chi, established in 1944.)
106	Ohio Eta	December 4, 1948 – 2022	Miami University	Oxford, Ohio	Inactive	
107	**Illinois Delta**	January 9, 1949	Bradley University	Peoria, Illinois	Active	(Note: Chapter formed from Gamma Nu, established in 1946.)
108	**Florida Beta**	February 12, 1949	Stetson University	DeLand, Florida	Active	(Note: Chapter formed from Chi Mu, established in 1946.)
109	**West Virginia Delta**	March 19, 1949	Davis & Elkins College	Elkins, West Virginia	Active	(Note: Chapter formed from Phi Delta Psi, established in 1940.)
110	**Tennessee Beta**	April 2, 1949	University of Memphis	Memphis, Tennessee	Active	(Note: Chapter formed from Seymour Mynders, established in 1913.)
111	**Maryland Beta**	May 7, 1949 – 1974; 1985	University of Maryland, College Park	College Park, Maryland	Active	(Note: Chapter formed from the Silon Club, established in 1948.)
112	Missouri Delta	May 14, 1949 – 1988	Drury College	Springfield, Missouri	Inactive	(Note: Chapter formed from Pegis Club, established in 1949.)
113	Florida Gamma	May 21, 1949 – 1975; 1983–1993; 200x ? – October 7, 2022	University of Miami	Coral Gables, Florida	Inactive	(Note: The national fraternity closed the chapter after a video surfaced of members chanting about murdering and raping women before a party, along with allegations of drugged drinks.)
114	Florida Delta	May 28, 1949 – 1990	Florida Southern College	Lakeland, Florida	Inactive	(Note: Chapter formed from the Mason-Dixon Club, established in 1948.)
115	**Ohio Theta**	July 30, 1949	University of Cincinnati	Cincinnati, Ohio	Active	(Note: Chapter formed from Iota Chi Epsilon, established in 1920.)
116	**Utah Beta**	February 25, 1950	University of Utah	Salt Lake City, Utah	Active	
117	**Florida Epsilon**	May 6, 1950 – 2008; 2015	Florida State University	Tallahassee, Florida	Active	(Note: In 2007, four members of the fraternity were arrested for hazing.)
118	Vermont Gamma	May 27, 1950 – 1993; 2002 – December 2011	University of Vermont	Burlington, Vermont	Inactive	(Note: The national fraternities revoked the chapter's charter in 2011 after a member circulated a survey asking, "if I could rape someone, who would it be?” The university banned the fraternity from campus for five years.)
119	**Ohio Iota**	September 30, 1950	University of Toledo	Toledo, Ohio	Active	(Note: Chapter formed from Chi Beta Chi, established in 1928.)
120	Massachusetts Gamma	November 11, 1950 – 1970; 1989–2019	Boston University	Boston, Massachusetts	Inactive	
121	**Ohio Kappa**	December 9, 1950	Bowling Green State University	Bowling Green, Ohio	Active	(Note: Chapter formed from Sigma Psi Omega, established in 1948.)
122	**Kansas Delta**	February 3, 1951	Washburn University	Topeka, Kansas	Active	
123	**Kansas Epsilon**	February 10, 1951	Emporia State University	Emporia, Kansas	Active	(Note: Chapter formed from Phi Delta Chi, established in 1921.)
124	Nebraska Beta	February 17, 1951 – October 4, 2019	University of Nebraska Omaha	Omaha, Nebraska	Inactive	(Note: Chapter formed from Alpha Sigma Lambda, established in 1919. The university and national fraternity closed the chapter after allegations of underage drinking and sexual assault.)
125	Pennsylvania Xi	January 15, 1952 – 1974; 1992–2004	Indiana University of Pennsylvania	Indiana, Pennsylvania	Inactive	(Note: Chapter formed from Phi Sigma, established in 1951.)
126	Arizona Alpha	February 16, 1952 – 2002; 2004–2019	Arizona State University	Tempe, Arizona	Inactive	
127	**Massachusetts Delta**	February 22, 1952 – 2005; 202x ?	Massachusetts Institute of Technology	Cambridge, Massachusetts	Active	(Note: Chapter formed from the Pegis Club, established in 1948.)
128	Missouri Epsilon	March 15, 1952 – 1986; 1988–1993	Culver–Stockton College	Canton, Missouri	Inactive	(Note: Chapter formed from Beta Sigma Gamma, established in 1947.)
129	Oklahoma Delta	May 3, 1952 – 1964	Oklahoma City University	Oklahoma City, Oklahoma	Inactive	(Note: Chapter formed from Phi Chi Phi, established in 1923.)
130	**Texas Beta**	May 10, 1952	University of North Texas	Denton, Texas	Active	(Note: Chapter formed from Phi Alpha Tau, established in 1949.)
131	Wisconsin Delta	December 6, 1952 – 1983	University of Wisconsin–Stevens Point	Stevens Point, Wisconsin	Inactive	(Note: Chapter formed from Chi Delta Rho, established in 1934.)
132	Colorado Epsilon	December 13, 1952 – 1980; 1992–1996	University of Northern Colorado	Greeley, Colorado	Inactive	(Note: Chapter formed from Lambda Gamma Kappa, established in 1930)
133	**Indiana Gamma**	February 21, 1953	Ball State University	Muncie, Indiana	Active	(Note: Chapter formed from Phi Delta Pi, established in 1948.)
134	North Carolina Eta	March 21, 1953 – 1964	High Point University	High Point, North Carolina	Inactive	(Note: Chapter formed from Epsilon Phi Omicron, established in 1949.)
135	**Ohio Lambda**	April 25, 1953 – 1983; 1991	Kent State University	Kent, Ohio	Active	(Note: Chapter formed from Chi Alpha, established in 1950.)
136	North Carolina Theta	May 9, 1953 – 1984	Lenoir Rhyne College	Hickory, North Carolina	Inactive	(Note: Chapter formed from Rho Sigma, established in 1934.)
137	**Mississippi Gamma**	May 16, 1953	University of Southern Mississippi	Hattiesburg, Mississippi	Active	
138	Florida Zeta	May 23, 1953 – 1975; 1985–2000; 2004–2019	University of Tampa	Tampa, Florida	Inactive	(Note: Chapter formed from Beta Chi FL Zeta, established in 1934. After going dormant, it was reformed in 1985 by Beta Epsilon Phi, established in 1984.)
139	**Missouri Zeta**	December 5, 1953 – 1989; 1999	Southeast Missouri State University	Cape Girardeau, Missouri	Active	(Note: Chapter was formed from the Webster Society, established in 1892.)
140	New York Epsilon	April 10, 1954 – 1971; 1979–1989; 1992–2009	University at Buffalo	Buffalo, New York	Inactive	(Note: Chapter formed from Beta Sigma Psi, established in 1946.)
141	**Tennessee Gamma**	April 10, 1954	East Tennessee State University	Johnson City, Tennessee	Active	(Note: Chapter formed from Nu Sigma Alpha, established in 1947.)
142	**Arizona Beta**	May 8, 1954 – 2008; 2015	University of Arizona	Tucson, Arizona	Active	
143	Arkansas Beta	May 15, 1954 – 2014	Henderson State University	Arkadelphia, Arkansas	Inactive	
144	**Indiana Delta**	May 15, 1954	Indiana State University	Terre Haute, Indiana	Active	(Note: Chapter formed from Kappa Zeta (local), established in 1954.)
145	Ohio Mu	May 22, 1954 – 2002	Youngstown State University	Youngstown, Ohio	Inactive	(Note: Chapter formed from Phi Sigma Epsilon, established in 1930.)
146	Iowa Epsilon	May 22, 1954 – 1984	Morningside College	Sioux City, Iowa	Inactive	(Note: Chapter formed from Alpha Tau Delta, established in 1924.)
147	**Texas Gamma**	February 5, 1955 – 1976; 1999	Texas Christian University	Fort Worth, Texas	Active	
148	Arkansas Gamma	February 26, 1955 – 2001	Arkansas State University	Jonesboro, Arkansas	Inactive	(Note: Chapter formed from Pyramid Club, established in 1953.)
149	**Indiana Epsilon**	March 12, 1955	University of Evansville	Evansville, Indiana	Active	
150	Georgia Beta	May 21, 1955 – 1991	Georgia State University	Atlanta, Georgia	Inactive	
151	**Michigan Beta**	November 19, 1955 – 2019	Western Michigan University	Kalamazoo, Michigan	Colony	(Note: Chapter formed from Sigma Epsilon (local), established in 1950. After going inactive, it was re-established as a colony in 2023.)
152	**Texas Delta**	February 4, 1956 – 1971; 1984	University of Houston	Houston, Texas	Active	(Note: Chapter formed from Alpha Kappa Pi, established in 1951.)
153	Michigan Gamma	March 17, 1956 – 2000	Central Michigan University	Mount Pleasant, Michigan	Inactive	(Note: Chapter formed from Alpha Beta Sigma, established in 1939.)
154	Michigan Delta	April 21, 1956 – 1960; 1964–2009	University of Detroit Mercy	Detroit, Michigan	Inactive	(Note: Chapter formed from Upsilon Delta Sigma, established in 1945.)
155	**Indiana Zeta**	May 5, 1956	Valparaiso University	Valparaiso, Indiana	Active	(Note: Chapter formed from Chi Phi Tau, established in 1947.)
156	Iowa Zeta	May 5, 1956 – 1973	Parsons College	Fairfield, Iowa	Inactive	(Note: Chapter formed from Zeta Theta Gamma, established in 1922. The chapter went inactive when Parsons closed in 1973.)
157	**Connecticut Alpha**	December 8, 1956 – 1973; 1980–2008; 2014	University of Connecticut	Storrs, Connecticut	Active	(Note: Chapter formed from Iota Nu Delta, established in 1953. It was removed from campus in the spring of 2008 for violations of the school code.)
158	Texas Epsilon	March 2, 1957 – January 17, 2020	Lamar University	Beaumont, Texas	Inactive	(Note: Chapter formed from Rho Gamma Sigma, established in 1944. In 2020, the national fraternity withdrew the chapter's charter after the university suspended it for hazing.)
159	**Missouri Eta**	April 27, 1957 – 1996; 2002	Missouri State University	Springfield, Missouri	Active	
160	Oregon Gamma	June 1, 1957 – 1993	Lewis & Clark College	Portland, Oregon	Inactive	(Note: Chapter formed from Delta Tau Rho, established in 1946.)
161	California Epsilon	March 8, 1958 – 1973	San Jose State University	San Jose, California	Inactive	(Note: Chapter formed from Kappa Tau, established in 1951)
162	Idaho Alpha	April 19, 1958 – 1972	Idaho State University	Pocatello, Idaho	Inactive	
163	**North Carolina Iota**	April 26, 1958	Barton College	Wilson, North Carolina	Active	(Note: Chapter formed from Sigma Rho Phi, established in 1954.)
164	**Kansas Zeta**	May 3, 1958 – 200x ?; 2013	Fort Hays State University	Hays, Kansas	Active	(Note: Chapter formed from Pegis, established in 1956.)
165	**Kansas Eta**	April 4, 1959	Wichita State University	Wichita, Kansas	Active	(Note: Chapter formed from Pi Alpha Pi, established in 1915.)
166	**Kentucky Gamma**	April 11, 1959	Kentucky Wesleyan College	Owensboro, Kentucky	Active	(Note: Chapter formed from the Keys, established in 1925.)
167	Tennessee Delta	May 26, 1960 – 1982	Tennessee Wesleyan College	Athens, Tennessee	Inactive	(Note: Chapter formed from Eta Iota Tau, established in 1928.)
168	Georgia Gamma	April 2, 1960 – 1974	Valdosta State University	Valdosta, Georgia	Inactive	(Note: Chapter formed from Sigma Epsilon (local), established in 1955.)
169	West Virginia Epsilon	April 9, 1960 – 2004	West Virginia University Institute of Technology	Beckley, West Virginia	Inactive	(Note: Chapter formed from Sigma Tau Alpha, established in 1929.)
170	Michigan Epsilon	May 7, 1960 – 1974; 1980–2012	Michigan State University	East Lansing, Michigan	Inactive	
171	Texas Zeta	March 4, 1961 – 1988	East Texas State University	Commerce, Texas	Inactive	(Note: Chapters formed from Tejas, established in 1946.) (Note: Texas A&M University at Commerce changed its name to East Texas A&M University on 7 November 2024.)
172	**Louisiana Beta**	April 8, 1961 – 1979; 1992	Louisiana State University	Baton Rouge, Louisiana	Active	
173	North Carolina Kappa	April 15, 1961 – 2010; 201x ?–2017	East Carolina University	Greenville, North Carolina	Inactive	
174	**Montana Beta**	April 22, 1961 – 1987; 199x ?– 200x ?; 201x ?	Montana State University	Bozeman, Montana	Active	
175	Michigan Zeta	February 10, 1962 – 2022	Ferris State University	Big Rapids, Michigan	Inactive	(Note: Chapter formed from Gamma Phi Sigma, established in 1920.)
176	**Nevada Alpha**	March 10, 1962 – 1963; 1997	University of Nevada, Reno	Reno, Nevada	Active	
177	**Texas Eta**	May 12, 1962 – 2007; 2020	Sam Houston State University	Huntsville, Texas	Active	(Note: Chapter formed from the Scots, established in 1958.)
178	**Georgia Delta**	March 30, 1963 – 1994; 1998	University of Georgia	Athens, Georgia	Active	
179	California Zeta	May 4, 1963 – 1973; 1999–2005	California State University, Long Beach	Long Beach, California	Inactive	
180	**California Eta**	May 11, 1963 – 1993; 1999	University of California, Davis	Davis, California	Active	
181	**Indiana Eta**	November 11, 1963	Indiana Institute of Technology	Fort Wayne, Indiana	Active	(Note: Chapter formed from Theta Tau Upsilon, established in 1958.)
182	**California Theta**	September 1, 1963	California State University, Sacramento	Sacramento, California	Active	(Note: Chapter formed from Delta Phi Omega, established in 1957.)
183	Pennsylvania Omicron	November 14, 1964 – 2000	Philadelphia University	Philadelphia, Pennsylvania	Inactive	(Note: Chapter forme from Phi Psi, established in 1902.)
184	**Ohio Nu**	November 21, 1964 – 1990; 2017	Cleveland State University	Cleveland, Ohio	Active	(Note: Chapter formed from Lambda Tau Delta, established in 1929.)
185	**Michigan Eta**	May 8, 1965	Michigan Technological University	Houghton, Michigan	Active	(Note: Chapter formed from the Igloo Club, established in 1963.)
186	**Nebraska Gamma**	May 15, 1965	University of Nebraska at Kearney	Kearney, Nebraska	Active	(Note: Chapter formed from Caledonia, established in 1920.)
187	North Carolina Lambda	October 29, 1965 – 1993	Belmont Abbey College	Belmont, North Carolina	Inactive	(Note: Chapter formed from Hibernians, established in 1961.)
188	Rhode Island Beta	November 20, 1965 – 1999; 2015–2017	University of Rhode Island	Kingston, Rhode Island	Inactive	(Note: Chapter was suspended in 2017.)
189	**Kentucky Delta**	March 18, 1967	Western Kentucky University	Bowling Green, Kentucky	Active	(Note: Chapter formed from Kappa Gamma Chi, established in 1963.)
190	Florida Eta	April 29, 1967 – 2000	Rollins College	Winter Park, Florida	Inactive	(Note: Chapter formed from Pi Rho Sigma, established in 1965.)
191	Wisconsin Epsilon	May 13, 1967 – 1976	University of Wisconsin–Oshkosh	Oshkosh, Wisconsin	Inactive	(Note: Chapter formed from Kappa Chi Epsilon, established in 1966.)
192	Ohio Xi	November 18, 1967 – 1980; 1988–2020	Ohio University	Athens, Ohio	Inactive	
193	Florida Theta	February 3, 1968 – 2010	Jacksonville University	Jacksonville, Florida	Inactive	(Note: Chapter formed from Omega Beta Chi, established in the 1950s. Its charter was revoked.)
194	**California Iota**	February 10, 1968 – 1987, July 8, 2026	California State University, Chico	Chico, California	Active	(Note: California Iota returned to campus ahead of the Fall 2026 semester.)
195	**Missouri Theta**	March 30, 1968	Central Missouri State University	Warrensburg, Missouri	Active	(Note: Chapter formed from Kappa Phi Epsilon, established in 1966.)
196	**Indiana Theta**	May 4, 1968	Trine University	Angola, Indiana	Active	(Note: Chapter formed from the Lamba chapter of Alpha Gamma Upsilon, established in 1949.)
197	**Florida Iota**	May 25, 1968 – 1992; 1997	University of South Florida	Tampa, Florida	Active	(Note: Chapter formed from Verdandi Club, established in 1962.)
198	Georgia Epsilon	February 1, 1969 – 1988; 1993–2016	Georgia Southern University	Statesboro, Georgia	Inactive	
199	**Kentucky Epsilon**	May 17, 1969	Murray State University	Murray, Kentucky	Active	(Note: Chapter formed from Beta Sigma, established in 1967.)
200	**Tennessee Epsilon**	September 26, 1969 – 1988; 1996	Tennessee Tech	Cookeville, Tennessee	Active	(Note: Chapter formed from Delta Chi Delta, established in 1963.)
201	West Virginia Zeta	January 10, 1970 – 1987	University of Charleston	Charleston, West Virginia	Inactive	(Note: Chapter formed from Sigma Epsilon Phi, established in 1967.)
202	**Texas Theta**	January 31, 1970 – 2003; 2010	St. Mary's University, Texas	San Antonio, Texas	Active	(Note: Chapter formed from Order of Barons, established in 1948.)
203	Ohio Omicron	April 4, 1970 – 1993	Defiance College	Defiance, Ohio	Inactive	(Note: Chapter formed from Phi Sigma Chi, established in 1967.)
204	South Carolina Beta	April 4, 1970 – February 2015	Clemson University	Clemson, South Carolina	Inactive	(Note: Chapter formed from Alpha Gamma, established in 1965. In 2015, the university suspended the chapter for five years for violating the student organization's conduct code. This followed the death of a pledge in the fall of 2014.)
205	**Virginia Iota**	April 11, 1970	James Madison University	Harrisonburg, Virginia	Active	(Note: Chapter formed from Phi Alpha Epsilon, established in 1961.)
206	**Virginia Kappa**	April 25, 1970 – 2013; 2019	Virginia Tech	Blacksburg, Virginia	Active	(Note: The chapter's charter was revoked. It was rechartered in 2019.)
207	**Wisconsin Zeta**	April 25, 1970 – 1985; 1990	Marquette University	Milwaukee, Wisconsin	Active	(Note: Chapter formed from Omega Alpha Pi, established in 1940.)
208	**Kentucky Zeta**	April 25, 1970	Morehead State University	Morehead, Kentucky	Active	
209	**Texas Iota**	November 21, 1970 – 1999; 2003-2022; July 8, 2026	Texas Tech University	Lubbock, Texas	Active	(Note: Texas Iota returned to campus ahead of the Fall 2026 semester.)
210	New Jersey Gamma	December 5, 1970 – 1985; 1990–2007	Seton Hall University	South Orange, New Jersey	Inactive	(Note: Chapter formed from Sigma Delta Phi, established in 1962.)
211	**Illinois Epsilon**	October 2, 1971 – November 2007; Fall 2021	Northern Illinois University	DeKalb, Illinois	Active	(Note: Chapter formed from Kappa Chi, established in 1966. The university suspended the chapter from campus for five years in 2007 for harassment.)
212	Wisconsin Eta	October 9, 1971 – 1979	University of Wisconsin–Stout	Menomonie, Wisconsin	Inactive	
213	Tennessee Zeta	October 16, 1971 – 2011	Lambuth University	Jackson, Tennessee	Inactive	(Note: Chapter formed from 1968 Beta Chi in 1968. It went inactive when the university closed in 2011.)
214	**Michigan Theta**	October 23, 1971	Lawrence Technological University	Southfield, Michigan	Active	(Note: Chapter formed from Kappa Phi Sigma, established in 1951.)
215	Illinois Zeta	November 13, 1971 – April 2013	Illinois State University	Normal, Illinois	Inactive	(Note: The national fraternity revoked the chapter's charter in 2013 for violating university policies. At the same time, the university removed the chapter for three or four years. As of 2024, the chapter was no longer under university suspension but was operating sub rosa.)
216	Indiana Iota	February 26, 1972 – 1992	Vincennes University	Vincennes, Indiana	Inactive	(Note: Chapter formed from Delta Gamma Iota, established in 1965.)
217	Pennsylvania Pi	April 22, 1972 – 1976	Duquesne University	Pittsburgh, Pennsylvania	Inactive	(Note: Chapter formed from Sigma Chi Theta, established in 1960.)
218	Texas Kappa	April 25, 1972 – September 2013	University of Texas at Arlington	Arlington, Texas	Inactive	(Note: The national fraternity revoked the chapter's charter in September 2013 after there were reports of three sexual assaults in one month. In October 2013, the university suspended the chapter for three years for serving alcohol to a minor.)
219	Florida Kappa	May 6, 1972 – 1991	Miami-Dade Community College	Miami, Florida	Inactive	
220	Georgia Zeta	May 20, 1972 – 1990	North Georgia College	Dahlonega, Georgia	Inactive	(Note: Chapter formed from 1933 Sigma Theta, established in 1933.)
221	California Kappa	December 2, 1972 – 1976	Northrop College	Inglewood, California	Inactive	
222	Texas Lambda	December 9, 1972 – 1988	Tyler Junior College	Tyler, Texas	Inactive	(Note: Chapter formed from Kappa Sigma Lambda, established in 1945.)
223	**Tennessee Eta**	January 27, 1973 – 1976; 1996	Austin Peay State University	Clarksville, Tennessee	Active	(Note: Chapter formed from Phi Sigma Chi, established in 1971.)
224	**Illinois Eta**	February 10, 1973	Southern Illinois University Edwardsville	Edwardsville, Illinois	Active	
225	**Texas Mu**	March 31, 1973 – 2017	Texas A&M University	College Station, Texas	Colony	(Note: Chapter formed from Phi Delta Sigma, established in 1965. The chapter closed after a member died in the chapter house from a drug overdose in August 2016. It was re-established as a colony in the fall of 2022.)
226	Texas Nu	March 31, 1973 – 1996	Texas Wesleyan University	Fort Worth, Texas	Inactive	(Note: Chapter formed from Sons of Sakkara, established in 1934.)
227	**North Carolina Mu**	April 28, 1973 – 1998; 2007	Elon University	Elon, North Carolina	Active	(Note: Chapter formed from Sigma Phi Beta, established in 1921.)
228	Texas Xi	April 28, 1973 – 1984	West Texas State University	Canyon, Texas	Inactive	
229	Missouri Iota	November 17, 1973 – 1982	Missouri Western State College	St. Joseph, Missouri	Inactive	
230	North Carolina Nu	December 1, 1973 – 1998; 200x ?– 2017	University of North Carolina at Charlotte	Charlotte, North Carolina	Colony	(Note: The national fraternity revoked the chapter's charter in 2017 for hazing.)
231	**Kansas Theta**	December 8, 1973	Pittsburg State University	Pittsburg, Kansas	Active	
232	Arizona Gamma	February 16, 1974 – 1996; 200x ?–2009	Northern Arizona University	Flagstaff, Arizona	Inactive	
233	**Ohio Pi**	February 16, 1974	Wright State University	Fairborn, Ohio	Active	
234	**Iowa Eta**	November 9, 1974 – 1974; 200x ?–2004; 2016	Loras College	Dubuque, Iowa	Active	
235	Arkansas Delta	December 7, 1974 – 1992	University of Arkansas at Little Rock	Little Rock, Arkansas	Inactive	
236	New Jersey Delta	December 7, 1974 – 1976	Fairleigh Dickinson University	Madison, New Jersey	Inactive	(Note: Chapter formed from Gamma Iota Alpha, established in 1966.)
237	Texas Omicron	December 7, 1974 – 2007	Angelo State University	San Angelo, Texas	Inactive	
238	California Lambda	May 24, 1975 – 1990	Santa Clara University	Santa Clara, California	Inactive	
239	North Carolina Xi	November 1, 1975 – December 2, 2010	Appalachian State University	Boone, North Carolina	Inactive	(Note: The university removed the chapter from campus for repeated IFC violations.)
240	Alabama Delta	November 1, 1975 – 1989	University of Alabama at Birmingham	Birmingham, Alabama	Inactive	
241	Texas Pi	January 17, 1976 – 1983; 1989–1997	Stephen F. Austin State University	Nacogdoches, Texas	Inactive	
242	Illinois Theta	February 21, 1976 – 1994	Western Illinois University	Macomb, Illinois	Inactive	
243	Illinois Iota	April 10, 1976 – 1984	Lewis University	Romeoville, Illinois	Inactive	
244	**Texas Rho**	December 4, 1976	Baylor University	Waco, Texas	Active	(Note: Chapter formed from Alpha Kappa Psi, established in 1958.)
245	Tennessee Theta	March 12, 1977 – 2014	Middle Tennessee State University	Murfreesboro, Tennessee	Inactive	
246	**Pennsylvania Rho**	March 19, 1977 – 2000; 2008	Villanova University	Villanova, Pennsylvania	Active	
247	Indiana Kappa	March 19, 1977 – 2006	Indiana University-Purdue University Fort Wayne	Fort Wayne, Indiana	Inactive	
248	Arkansas Epsilon	April 2, 1977 – 2022	Arkansas Tech University	Russellville, Arkansas	Inactive	
249	Missouri Kappa	April 16, 1977 – 202x ?	University of Missouri–Kansas City	Kansas City, Missouri	Inactive	
250	Alabama Epsilon	October 10, 1977 – 1991	Auburn University at Montgomery	Montgomery, Alabama	Inactive	
251	Virginia Lambda	March 11, 1978 – February 10, 2016	Longwood University	Farmville, Virginia	Inactive	(Note: The university suspended the chapter from February 10, 2016, to January 18, 2017, for hazing. However, the national office revoked the chapter's charter.)
252	**Alabama Zeta**	March 25, 1978	Huntingdon College	Montgomery, Alabama	Active	
253	Michigan Iota	April 1, 1978 – 2011	Northwood University	Midland, Michigan	Inactive	(Note: Chapter formed from Sigma Alpha, established in 1974.)
254	Massachusetts Epsilon	April 8, 1978 – 1997	Bentley College	Waltham, Massachusetts	Inactive	(Note: Chapter formed from Beta Tau Alpha, established in 1922.)
255	**Idaho Beta**	April 22, 1978 – 1990	Boise State University	Boise, Idaho	Colony	(Note: The chapter was re-established as a colony in 2022.)
256	New York Zeta	March 3, 1979 – 1997	Marist College	Poughkeepsie, New York	Inactive	
259	Texas Sigma	March 3, 1979 – 2012	University of Texas at San Antonio	San Antonio, Texas	Inactive	
257	South Carolina Gamma	March 31, 1979 – 1992	Francis Marion University	Florence, South Carolina	Inactive	(Note: Chapter formed from Kappa Epsilon Gamma, established in 1965.)
258	South Carolina Delta	March 31, 1979 – 1995	Winthrop University	Rock Hill, South Carolina	Inactive	(Note: Chapter formed from Alpha Mu Omega, established in the 1970s.)
260	New York Eta	April 7, 1979 – 2000	Buffalo State University	Buffalo, New York	Inactive	
261	Illinois Kappa	April 15, 1979 – 2000	Southern Illinois University Carbondale	Carbondale, Illinois	Inactive	
262	Pennsylvania Sigma	April 21, 1979 – 1993	York College of Pennsylvania	Spring Garden Township, Pennsylvania	Inactive	(Note: Chapters formed from Tau Sigma Sigma, established in the 1970s.)
263	Maryland Gamma	April 28, 1979 – 1985	Towson State College	Towson, Maryland	Inactive	(Note: Chapter formed from Delta Phi Omega, established in 1975.)
264	**South Carolina Epsilon**	November 10, 1979	Coastal Carolina University	Conway, South Carolina	Active	
265	**Pennsylvania Tau**	December 1, 1979	West Chester University	West Chester, Pennsylvania	Active	
266	**Missouri Lambda**	April 19, 1980	Northwest Missouri State University	Maryville, Missouri	Active	
267	New York Theta	April 26, 1980 – 1992	State University of New York at Geneseo	Geneseo, New York	Inactive	(Note: Separated from the national and became local fraternity Sigma Theta Epsilon.)
268	**California Mu**	April 26, 1980 – 2009; 2023	California State Polytechnic University, Pomona	Pomona, California	Active	
269	Tennessee Iota	October 25, 1980 – 1984	Lincoln Memorial University	Harrogate, Tennessee	Inactive	(Note: Chapter formed from Alpha Lambda Zeta, established in 1927.)
270	**New York Iota**	November 1, 1980	State University of New York at Fredonia	Fredonia, New York	Active	(Note: Chapter formed from Chi Omega Beta.)
271	New Jersey Epsilon	November 15, 1980 – 1994	Rowan College of New Jersey	Glassboro, New Jersey	Inactive	
272	Virginia Mu	November 22, 1980 – 2012	George Mason University	Fairfax, Virginia	Inactive	
273	Georgia Eta	February 14, 1981 – 1992	Southern College of Technology	Marietta, Georgia	Inactive	
274	California Nu	March 7, 1981 – 1996	Chapman University	Orange, California	Inactive	
275	Texas Tau	March 7, 1981 – 1997	Texas State University	San Marcos, Texas	Inactive	
276	**Virginia Nu**	March 21, 1981 – 1991; 2019	Radford University	Radford, Virginia	Active	
277	Florida Lambda	March 28, 1981 – 1991	Saint Leo University	St. Leo, Florida	Inactive	
278	**Missouri Mu**	March 28, 1981	Truman State University	Kirksville, Missouri	Active	
279	New York Kappa	November 11, 1981 – 1995	Daemen College	Brooklyn, New York	Inactive	
280	California Xi	December 5, 1981 – 1997	San Francisco State University	San Francisco, California	Inactive	
281	Pennsylvania Upsilon	January 23, 1982 – 1994; 2015–2024	Clarion University of Pennsylvania	Clarion, Pennsylvania	Inactive	
282	North Carolina Omicron	March 20, 1982 – April 2024	University of North Carolina at Greensboro	Greensboro, North Carolina	Inactive	(Note: The university banned the fraternity from campus for ten years for hazing and recruitment violations.)
283	New York Lambda	April 24, 1982 – 202x ?	Canisius College	Buffalo, New York	Inactive	
284	New York Mu	April 24, 1982 – 1989	State University of New York at Cortland	Cortland, New York	Inactive	
285	**Kentucky Eta**	October 30, 1982 – 1992; April 4, 2009	Northern Kentucky University	Highland Heights, Kentucky	Active	(Note: Chapter formed from Sigma Nu Alpha, established in 1973.)
286	New Hampshire Beta	March 12, 1983 – 1994	New England College	Henniker, New Hampshire	Inactive	(Note: Chapter formed from Sigma Alpha Beta, established in 1949. Its charter was removed for a lack of members.)
287	Michigan Kappa	April 23, 1983 – 2017	Grand Valley State University	Allendale, Michigan	Inactive	(Note: In 2017, the university banned the chapter from campus for five years after a history of alcohol and hazing violations.)
288	Maryland Delta	April 30, 1983 – 2006	McDaniel College	Westminster, Maryland	Inactive	(Note: Chapter formed at Western Maryland College, which became McDaniel College in 2003.)
289	**North Carolina Pi**	November 5, 1983 – 200x ?; April 17, 2020	Western Carolina University	Cullowhee, North Carolina	Active	(Note: Chapter formed from Sigma Phi Chi, established in 1983.)
290	Louisiana Gamma	November 19, 1983 – April 2012	Loyola University New Orleans	New Orleans, Louisiana	Inactive	(Note: The national fraternity suspended the chapter for undisclosed reasons in 2012.)
291	New Hampshire Gamma	April 28, 1984 – January 2006; 2015 – October 5, 2018	University of New Hampshire	Durham, New Hampshire	Inactive	(Note: The national fraternity pulled the chapter's charter in January 2006 for failure to achieve the GPA requirements of the North American Interfraternity Council. It was re-chartered in 2015 but lost its university recognition and charter in 2018 for multiple violations of the Code of Student Conduct.)
292	Pennsylvania Phi	May 5, 1984 – 2008	Susquehanna University	Selinsgrove, Pennsylvania	Inactive	
293	**California Omicron**	November 3, 1984	University of California, Los Angeles	Los Angeles, California	Active	
294	Massachusetts Zeta	March 9, 1985 – November 15, 2015	Tufts University	Medford, Massachusetts	Inactive	(Note: Chapter disaffiliated and became local fraternity Pi Rho Omega, following several racist incidents at other SigEp chapters. The new local fraternity was suspended three years later, from May 2018 until August 2019, for hazing and alcohol violations.)
295	Florida Mu	April 13, 1985 – 2008	University of Central Florida	Orlando, Florida	Inactive	(Note: Charter revoked.)
296	Texas Upsilon	April 13, 1985 – March 2013; 20xx?– 2021	Southern Methodist University	Dallas, Texas	Inactive	(Note: In 2013, the university suspended the chapter for two years after allegations that its members beat a member of another fraternity who was held against his will.)
297	**Virginia Xi**	April 20, 1985	Old Dominion University	Norfolk, Virginia	Active	
298	**California Pi**	May 18, 1985	Stanford University	Stanford, California	Active	
299	New York Nu	March 1, 1986 – 2002	Binghamton University	Vestal, New York	Inactive	
300	**New York Xi**	April 19, 1986	University of Rochester	Rochester, New York	Active	
301	**Nebraska Delta**	December 6, 1986	Creighton University	Omaha, Nebraska	Active	
302	**Florida Nu**	January 17, 1987	Florida International University	University Park, Florida	Active	
303	Alabama Eta	February 28, 1987 – 1991	University of South Alabama	Mobile, Alabama	Inactive	
304	New York Omicron	March 21, 1987 – 1992	University at Albany, SUNY	Albany, New York	Active	
305	Pennsylvania Chi	April 4, 1987 – 2001	Albright College	Reading, Pennsylvania	Inactive	(Note: Chapter formed from Alpha Pi Omega, established in 1926.)
306	Nevada Beta	November 14, 1987 – 1995	University of Nevada, Las Vegas	Paradise, Nevada	Inactive	
307	**California Rho**	February 6, 1988 – May 1997; 2000	University of California, San Diego	San Diego, California	Active	(Note: In 1997, the chapter was shut down for four years after a pledge nearly died due to a hazing ritual.)
308	**Arkansas Zeta**	March 19, 1988	University of Central Arkansas	Conway, Arkansas	Active	
309	New York Pi	April 9, 1988 – 2004	State University of New York at Oswego	Oswego, New York	Inactive	
310	**Pennsylvania Psi**	November 12, 1988	Saint Joseph's University	Philadelphia, Pennsylvania	Active	
311	Missouri Nu	March 25, 1989 – 2017	Saint Louis University	St. Louis, Missouri	Inactive	
312	Connecticut Beta	April 15, 1989 – 1996	University of Hartford	West Hartford, Connecticut	Inactive	
313	Michigan Lambda	November 4, 1989 – July 25, 2005	Eastern Michigan University	Ypsilanti, Michigan	Inactive	(Note: Charter removed)
314	**California Sigma**	January 13, 1990	California State University, Northridge	Los Angeles, California	Active	
315	New York Rho	March 10, 1990 – 2012	St. John's University	New York City, New York	Inactive	
316	**California Tau**	April 7, 1990 – August 2011	California Polytechnic State University, San Luis Obispo	San Luis Obispo, California	Colony	(Note: The university banned the chapter for six years for alcohol violations and an alleged rape. The chapter was re-established as a colony in 2021.)
317	**Alabama Theta**	April 14, 1990 – October 2015	Jacksonville State University	Jacksonville, Alabama	Colony	(Note: Chapter formed from Pi Sigma Chi, established in 1986. In 2015, the university suspended the chapter for three years for recurring hazing incidents, alleged racism, and sexual misconduct. This was followed by the national fraternity revoking the chapter's charter. It was re-established as a colony in 2023.)
318	Rhode Island Gamma	May 5, 1990 – 1994	Bryant College of Business Administration	Smithfield, Rhode Island	Inactive	
319	Illinois Lambda	May 12, 1990 – 2012; 2016–2025	Northwestern University	Evanston, Illinois	Inactive	(Note: Chapter restricted for multiple violations, then suspended after failing to complete sanctions. (local).)
320	North Carolina Rho	March 15, 1991 – 2005	University of North Carolina Wilmington	Wilmington, North Carolina	Inactive	(Note: Chapter formed from Tau Delta Theta, established in 1989.)
321	**Pennsylvania Omega**	April 6, 1991	La Salle University	Philadelphia, Pennsylvania	Active	
322	**Washington Gamma**	June 1, 1991	Eastern Washington University	Cheney, Washington	Active	
323	Illinois Mu	October 19, 1991 – 2018	University of Chicago	Chicago, Illinois	Inactive	(Note: The chapter dissaffiliated from the national fraternity and became the Epsilon Club (local).)
324	New York Sigma	November 23, 1991 – 1998	Ithaca College	Ithaca, New York	Inactive	
328	**Massachusetts Eta**	February 29, 1992	Northeastern University	Boston, Massachusetts	Active	
325	New Hampshire Delta	March 7, 1992 – 2006	Plymouth State University	Plymouth, New Hampshire	Inactive	
326	Ohio Rho	March 28, 1992 – 2016	University of Dayton	Dayton, Ohio	Inactive	
327	South Carolina Zeta	April 11, 1992 – 2010	College of Charleston	Charleston, South Carolina	Inactive	
329	**Illinois Nu**	December 1, 1992	Eastern Illinois University	Charleston, Illinois	Active	
330	Iowa Theta	January 30, 1993 – 2023	University of Northern Iowa	Cedar Falls, Iowa	Inactive	
331	Maryland Epsilon	January 30, 1993 – 2002	University of Maryland, Baltimore County	Catonsville, Maryland	Inactive	
332	New Mexico Beta	April 17, 1993 – 2000	New Mexico State University	Las Cruces, New Mexico	Inactive	
333	D.C. Beta	May 1, 1993 – 1996	Gallaudet University	Washington, D.C.	Inactive	
334	Hawaii Alpha	April 9, 1994 – 2000	University of Hawaiʻi at Mānoa	Manoa, Honolulu, Hawaii	Inactive	
335	**California Upsilon**	April 23, 1994	California State University, San Bernardino	San Bernardino, California	Active	
336	**North Dakota Alpha**	February 4, 1995	University of North Dakota	Grand Forks, North Dakota	Active	
337	Tennessee Kappa	March 25, 1995 – August 2023	University of Tennessee at Martin	Martin, Tennessee	Inactive	
338	**California Ph**	May 13, 1995	California State University, Fresno	Fresno, California	Active	
339	Ohio Sigma	October 21, 1995 – September 29, 2016; 2021 – August 26, 2026	Case Western Reserve University	Cleveland, Ohio	Inactive	(Note: Charter revoked by unanimous decision of chapter alumni and national fraternity. It was re-established as a colony in 2022.) (Note: Colony went inactive during Fall 2026 due to failing to meet minimum membership requirements to recharter.)
340	**Massachusetts Theta**	April 23, 1996	Babson College	Wellesley, Massachusetts	Active	
341	**Florida Xi**	April 27, 1996 – December 18, 2009; 20xx ?–2022; July 8, 2026	Florida Atlantic University	Boca Raton, Florida	Active	(Note: Charter suspended for allegations of hazing and alcohol.) (Note: Florida Xi returned to campus ahead of the Fall 2026 semester after being revoked for hazing.)
342	**Virginia Omicron**	September 21, 1996	University of Lynchburg	Lynchburg, Virginia	Active	
343	New York Tau	October 12, 1996 – 1998	Hofstra University	Hempstead, New York	Inactive	
344	**Maryland Zeta**	November 2, 1996 – 1999; 2005	Salisbury University	Salisbury, Maryland	Active	
345	New York Upsilon	October 26, 1996 – 1998	Adelphi University	Garden City, New York	Inactive	
346	**South Dakota Alpha**	February 15, 1997	South Dakota State University	Brookings, South Dakota	Active	
347	**California Chi**	March 1, 1997	Loyola Marymount University	Los Angeles, California	Active	
348	Alaska Alpha	March 1, 1997 – March 1, 2017	University of Alaska Fairbanks	College, Alaska	Inactive	
349	California Psi	April 11, 1997 – 20xx ?	Pepperdine University	Los Angeles County, California	Inactive	(Note: Chapter formed from Tau Sigma Rho, established in 1967.)
350	Connecticut Gamma	April 12, 1997 – 2015	Eastern Connecticut State University	Willimantic, Connecticut	Inactive	
351	California Omega	April 12, 1997 – 2012	California State University, Fullerton	Fullerton, California	Inactive	
352	Louisiana Delta	May 3, 1997 – 2005	University of Louisiana at Monroe	Monroe, Louisiana	Inactive	
353	Texas Phi	September 6, 1997 – 2004	University of Texas at El Paso	El Paso, Texas	Inactive	
354	**California Beta Alpha**	November 16, 1997	University of California, Irvine	Irvine, California	Active	
355	Ohio Tau	March 9, 1998 – 2013	Denison University	Granville, Ohio	Inactive	
356	**New York Phi**	March 27, 1999	Columbia University	New York City, New York	Active	
357	**Wisconsin Theta**	October 14, 2000	University of Wisconsin–Platteville	Platteville, Wisconsin	Active	
358	**Pennsylvania Beta Alpha**	October 15, 2000	Moravian University	Bethlehem, Pennsylvania	Active	
359	**California Beta Beta**	May 5, 2001	University of San Diego	San Diego, California	Active	
360	**Texas Chi**	September 15, 2001	Texas A&M University–Corpus Christi	Corpus Christi, Texas	Active	
361	**New Jersey Zeta**	February 2, 2002	Rider University	Lawrence Township, New Jersey	Active	
362	**New York Chi**	April 6, 2002	Clarkson University	Potsdam, New York	Active	
363	**Pennsylvania Beta Beta**	October 19, 2002	Drexel University	Philadelphia, Pennsylvania	Active	
364	**Illinois Xi**	June 28, 2003	DePaul University	Chicago, Illinois	Active	
365	**Virginia Pi**	October 31, 2004	Christopher Newport University	Newport News, Virginia	Active	
366	**Ohio Upsilon**	May 9, 2005	John Carroll University	University Heights, Ohio	Active	(Note: Chapter formed from Alpha Rho Omega, established in 1995.)
367	Connecticut Delta	May 9, 2005 – 2020	Yale University	New Haven, Connecticut	Inactive	
368	Connecticut Epsilon	May 23, 2006 – 2018	Quinnipiac University	Hamden, Connecticut	Inactive	
369	**California Beta Gamma**	April 13, 2007	University of California, Riverside	Riverside, California	Active	
370	**D.C. Gamma**	April 21, 2007	Georgetown University	Washington, D.C.	Active	
371	**D.C. Delta**	October 4, 2008	American University	Washington, D.C.	Active	
372	**Florida Omicron**	November 3, 2008	Florida Gulf Coast University	Fort Myers, Florida	Active	
373	**Massachusetts Iota**	March 22, 2013	Boston College	Chestnut Hill, Massachusetts	Active	
374	Georgia Theta	October 2, 2015 – 2025	Emory University	Atlanta, Georgia	Inactive	
