= Mineral Nutrition of Plants: Principles and Perspectives =

Book by Emanuel Epstein published in 1972

- Author: Emanuel Epstein
- Language: English
- Subject: Plant nutrition
- Genre: Non-fiction
- Publication date: 1972

Mineral Nutrition of Plants: Principles and Perspectives (1972) is a book about plant nutrition by Emanuel Epstein.

== Reception ==
F. C. Steward, C. Bould, and Manuel Lerdau have reviewed the book.
