= Arren =

Arren may refer to:

- Arren Bar-Even (1980–2020), Israeli biochemist and biologist
- Arren, a major character in The Farthest Shore and The Other Wind, fantasy novels by Ursula K. Le Guin
- Arrën, Albania, a village and former municipality

== See also ==
- Aren (disambiguation)
