= Aren =

Aren may refer to:

== People ==
=== Given name ===
- Aren Davoudi (born 1986), Armenian basketball player
- Aren Kuri (born 1991), Japanese baseball player
- Aren Maeir (born 1958), American-born Israeli archaeologist and professor at Bar Ilan University
- Aren Nielsen (born 1968), American competitive figure skater
- Aren X. Tulchinsky, Canadian novelist

=== Surname ===
- Andreas Arén (born 1985), Swedish ski jumper
- Sadun Aren (1922–2008), Turkish academic and politician
- Väino Aren (1933–2023), Estonian ballet dancer and actor

== Places ==
- Aren, Pyrénées-Atlantiques, Nouvelle-Aquitaine, France, a commune
- Aren, also known as Pondok Aren, Indonesia, a district in the city of South Tangerang
- Arén, Spain, a municipality

== See also ==
- Arren (disambiguation)
