= Arren Bar-Even =

Israeli biochemist (1980-2020)

- ארן בר-אבן
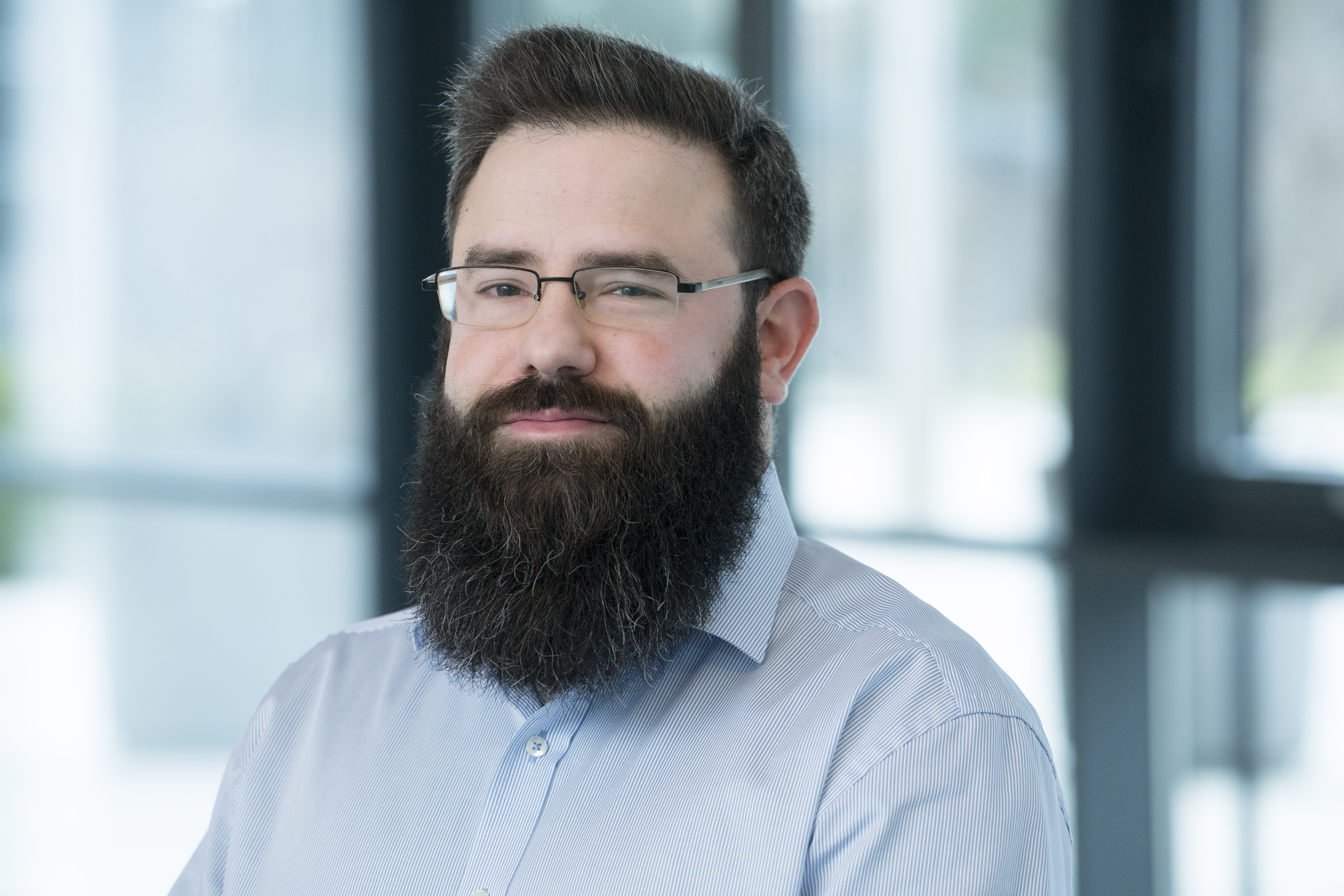
- Born: Arren Bar-Even; June 6, 1980; Haifa, Israel
- Died: September 18, 2020 (aged 40)
- Occupations: Biochemist, synthetic biologist
- Known for: Research on metabolic engineering, agricultural sustainability
- Notable work: Formate bioeconomy

Arren Bar-Even (Hebrew: ארן בר-אבן; 6 June 1980 – 18 September 2020) was an Israeli biochemist and synthetic biologist. He made pioneering advances in the design and implementation of novel pathways for improved CO_{2} fixation. and formate utilisation.

== Education and career ==
Bar-Even was born on 6 June 1980 in Haifa, Israel. He obtained his bachelor's degree in the excellence program from the Faculty of Biology from Technion, the Israeli Institute of Technology in 2002. He then completed his master's degree in Bioinformatics at the Weizmann Institute of Science in 2005. After working as a consultant in the biotech industry for some years, he returned to academia to complete a PhD degree in biochemistry at the Weizmann Institute of Science in 2012. In his work with Ron Milo as his supervisor, he specialized in the design principles of cellular metabolism. From 2015, Bar-Even became junior research group leader of the “Systems and Synthetic Metabolism” lab at the Max Planck Institute of Molecular Plant Physiology.

== Research ==
In his PhD in metabolic engineering, he shed light on enzymes and metabolic pathways in his meta-analyses of key design principles. His grasp of the fundamentals of how metabolism operates and evolves led to the invention of novel pathways for synthetic carbon fixation, formate assimilation, photorespiration bypasses, and significant contributions to the establishment of the predominant CO_{2} fixation cycle – the Calvin-Benson cycle – in E. coli.

Based on formate, Bar-Even established the idea of a formate bio-economy with the potential to revolutionize food- and feedstock production among other biotechnological sectors for a circular carbon economy. In the formate bio-economy, formate is produced from CO_{2} physiochemically using renewable energy sources and subsequently fed as sole carbon source to engineered microbes to produce a myriad of products, such as fuels, other value-added chemicals, food and feedstock.

After starting his own lab at the Max Planck Institute of Molecular Plant Physiology, Bar-Even worked among other projects on the biological realisation of the formate bio-economy. This mainly consisted of engineering model organisms (e.g. E. coli, S. cerevisiae, etc.) towards formatotrophic growth – the ability to grow on formate as a sole carbon source. In 2020, this goal was achieved with the demonstration of the first synthetic formatotrophic E. coli cells growing via the reductive glycine pathway, a synthetic pathway designed by Bar-Even and only later found to operate in nature. Notably, the engineered cells could also grow on methanol as sole carbon source, which had been a long-standing goal of synthetic biology.
