= 2014 University of Minnesota rape case =

Student rape case highlighting mishandling by authorities

The 2014 University of Minnesota rape case was widely publicized by the American media as it highlighted the inadequacies of police responses to victims of sexual assault. The victim in the case, 19-year-old Abby Honold, afterwards sought to establish federal funding for appropriate training of officials and first responders. A bill known as the Abby Honold Bill was first introduced to Congress by Senator Amy Klobuchar in 2017. It was enacted into law on March 15, 2022, as part of a $1.5 trillion budget bill. The law gives law enforcement agencies access to federal grants and enacts a two-year test program to train police on how to conduct investigations without exposing victims to further trauma.

== History ==
The case was a highly mediatized case involving Daniel "Dan" York Drill-Mellum, a student at the University of Minnesota and fraternity member of Sigma Phi Epsilon. Drill-Mellum violently raped 19-year-old Abby Honold twice at his apartment in November 2014 after luring her from a Minnesota Golden Gophers tailgate. He left claw marks on her body, bit chunks off her breasts, and shoved his fist so far into her mouth that he tore open part of her tongue during the attack. After escaping, Honold immediately went to a hospital, where a nurse described the injuries as some of the worst she had ever seen.

Drill-Mellum was arrested shortly after Honold reported his assault on her, but was released after his fraternity brothers secretly recorded a five-minute phone call with Honold. During the call, she stated twice that Drill-Mellum had raped her and detailed her injuries. But when Drill-Mellum's roommate asked her, "did you guys have consensual sex?”, he mumbled the words to make it sound like "actual sex." Honold responded "yes" and the Prosecutor declined the charges. On December 24, 2015, Drill-Mellum was arrested again when Kevin Randolph, a veteran of the University of Minnesota's police department, reviewed the recording and successfully re-opened the case. Drill-Mellum was tried for the rape of Honold and another victim he raped on Halloween 2014.

The case attracted ongoing coverage in the media after Honold came forward and talked about how initially authorities did not press charges.

On August 31, 2016, Drill-Mellum was sentenced to 74 months in prison following his guilty plea to two counts of rape. He was released from prison on September 29, 2020.

In November 2016, an episode of the Dr. Phil Show about the case was aired. And in April 2017, Investigation Discovery paired with Deadline host Tamron Hall to air an episode about the case.

After the trial, Honold contacted the office of Senator Al Franken to set up a meeting about a bill that would help law enforcement improve the reporting process for future victims. The bill seeks to establish federal funding for the purpose of training officers and first responders on the most effective techniques to use when interviewing sexual assault victims. Educating law enforcement officials and investigators on proper techniques is a key component of the legislation, which is tentatively named the Abby Honold Bill.

In November 2017, after Franken was accused of sexual misconduct, Honold sought a new sponsor for the bill. Minnesota Senator Amy Klobuchar's office promptly picked it up, and is working with Honold.
