= Theta Upsilon Omega =

American collegiate fraternity (1924–1938)

- ΘΥΩ
- Founded: February 1924; 102 years ago Lewisburg, Pennsylvania, US
- Type: Social
- Former affiliation: NIC
- Status: Merged
- Merge date: April 23, 1938
- Successor: Sigma Phi Epsilon
- Scope: National
- Member badge
- Colors: Midnight blue and gold
- Flower: Dark Red Rose
- Publication: The Omegan
- Chapters: 17
- Headquarters: United States

Theta Upsilon Omega (ΘΥΩ), was a national collegiate fraternity in the United States. It was formed by the merger of nine local fraternities in 1924. On April 23, 1938, Theta Upsilon Omega merged with Sigma Phi Epsilon.

== History ==
Representatives of several local fraternities at a December 1, 1923 meeting of locals, organized by the National Interfraternity Conference (NIC), determined to form a new national through amalgamation. The following nine local fraternities were part of the NIC meeting and formed Theta Upsilon Omega:

- Delta Tau, Worcester Polytechnic Institute
- Phi Kappa Pi, Stevens Institute of Technology
- Zeus Fraternity, University of Illinois
- Kappa Sigma Phi, Temple University
- Beta Kappa Psi, Bucknell University
- Kappa Tau Omega, The George Washington University
- Sigma Beta, University of New Hampshire
- Delta Kappa Nu, Penn State University
- Phi Alpha Pi, Davidson College

They were joined by Pi Rho Phi of Westminster College at the Charter Arch Convocation meeting, held at Bucknell University in Lewisburg, Pennsylvania from February 21 to 23, 1924. The result was the creation of Theta Upsilon, later called Theta Upsilon Omega. All then chapters received their charter and inducted members on May 2, 1924. With the merger of the ten fraternities, Theta Upsilon's formed with 544 members. Merle C. Cowden, of Worcester, was chosen first national president of Theta Upsilon Omega.

The fraternity established its first alumni club in Pittsburgh, Pennsylvania in 1925. The fraternity had twelve chapters and 988 active members on June 1, 1926.

Additional chapters were chartered, but growth stalled during the Great Depression. Following negotiations on April 23, 1938, Theta Upsilon Omega merged with Sigma Phi Epsilon. Of its thirteen active chapters, four merged with existing Sigma Phi Epsilon chapters, and seven others were granted new charters in Sigma Phi Epsilon. One chapter reverted to local status under its original name and another merged with Theta Chi on its campus.

== Symbols ==
Theta Upsilon Omega's official seal was a voided fusil bearing inscriptions regarding the fraternity and having in the center, the Squire's helmet facing to the left. Its crest was a dragon sitting on a mural crown, above an esquire's helmet. Its coat of arms was designed by Emily Helen Butterfield.

The fraternity's badge was a small pin of blue enamel with a circular contour in the center of which was a ten-pointed gold star enclosing a jewel. The badge had three short triangular arms which were equidistant around the pin, and on them, in gold, the Greek letters ΘΥΩ. In the spaces between the arms will be six pearls, two between each pair of arms. Charter members could wear the pin with a diamond center, and initiated members could substitute a ruby for the diamond or wear a plain pin.

The fraternity's pledge button was a cross fitchy of midnight blue with a border of gold. Its recognition pin was its crest in old gold, consisting of a mural crown from the top of which issues a dragon's head.

The fraternity's flag was equally sized vertical bands of blue, gold, and blue with a blue cross fitchy in the center of the gold band. Its colors were midnight blue and gold. Its flower was a dark red rose. Its publication was The Omegan.

== Chapters ==
Following is a list of Theta Upsilon Omega chapters.

Chapter	Charter date and range	Institution	Location	Status	Ref.
Beta Alpha	May 2, 1924 – April 3, 1938	Worcester Polytechnic Institute	Worcester, Massachusetts	Merged (ΣΦΕ)	(Note: The Beta Alpha chapter was created from Delta Tau (local), a group that dated from 1906.) (Note: This was a founding chapter of Theta Upsilon Omega.) (Note: This chapter became the Massachusetts Beta chapter of Sigma Phi Epsilon in 1938.)
Gamma Alpha	May 2, 1924 – May 7, 1938	Stevens Institute of Technology	Hoboken, New Jersey	Merged (ΣΦΕ)	(Note: Chapter was created from Phi Kappa Pi (local), a group that dated from 1906. This chapter became the New Jersey Alpha chapter of Sigma Phi Epsilon in 1938.)
Delta Alpha	May 2, 1924 – April 23, 1938	University of Illinois	Illinois	Merged (ΣΦΕ)	(Note: Chapter was created from the Zeus Fraternity (local), a group that dated from 1919) (Note: This chapter merged into a pre-existing chapter of Sigma Phi Epsilon.)
Epsilon Alpha	May 2, 1924 – May 8, 1938	Temple University	Philadelphia, Pennsylvania	Merged (ΣΦΕ)	(Note: Chapter became the Pennsylvania Mu chapter of Sigma Phi Epsilon in 1938.)
Zeta Alpha	May 2, 1924 – April 30, 1938	Bucknell University	Lewisburg, Pennsylvania	Merged (ΣΦΕ)	(Note: Chapter was created from Beta Kappa Psi (local), a group that dated from 1920. It became the Pennsylvania Kappa chapter of Sigma Phi Epsilon in 1938.)
Eta Alpha	May 2, 1924 – April 23, 1938	George Washington University	Washington, D.C.	Merged (ΣΦΕ)	(Note: Chapter was created from Kappa Tau Omega (local), a group that dated from 1921. It merged into a pre-existing chapter of Sigma Phi Epsilon.)
Theta Alpha	May 2, 1924 – 1936	University of New Hampshire	Durham, New Hampshire	Inactive	(Note: Chapter was created from Sigma Beta (local), a group that dated from 1921. In 1936, it everted to local status as Sigma Beta (local).)
Iota Alpha	May 2, 1924 – 1938	Pennsylvania State University	State College, Pennsylvania	Merged (ΘΧ)	(Note: Chapter was created from Delta Kappa Nu (local), a group that dated from 1921. After creation, it absorbed another small local, Pi Kappa Nu.) (Note: Chapter merged into the pre-existing Omega chapter of Theta Chi, formed in 1919.)
Kappa Alpha	May 2, 1924 – 1935	Davidson College	Davidson, North Carolina	Inactive	(Note: Chapter was created from Phi Alpha Pi (local), a group that dated from 1922.)
Lambda Alpha	May 2, 1924 – April 30, 1938	Westminster College	New Wilmington, Pennsylvania	Merged (ΣΦΕ)	(Note: Chapter was previously the revived Alpha chapter of Pi Rho Phi, a small, six-chapter fraternity formed at Westminster in 1854. In 1868 it merged with Delta Tau Delta but only lasted a year with them, and went dormant. It was revived, again, as Pi Rho Phi in 1872, then became a founding member of Theta Upsilon Omega in 1924. Two years later the only other surviving (unnamed, possibly Gamma) chapter of Pi Rho Phi, established in 1910 at Monmouth, would also join Theta Upsilon Omega as its Zeta Beta chapter. That Monmouth group had originally been Tau Lambda Phi (local), formed in 1907.) (Note: Chapter became the Pennsylvania Lambda chapter of Sigma Phi Epsilon in 1938.)
Beta Beta	1925–1935	Miami University	Oxford, Ohio	Inactive - later became OH Eta chapter of ΣΦΕ	(Note: Chapter was created from Phi Sigma Phi (local), a group that dated from 1923. Name similarity to the national fraternity, ΦΣΦ, formed in 1987 is coincidental.)
Gamma Beta	March 1925 – April 23, 1938	University of California, Berkeley	Berkeley, California	Merged (ΣΦΕ)	(Note: Chapter was created from the Tilicum Club (local), a group that dated from 1913. Name similarity to the local club of that era at the University of Minnesota, Tillikum, is coincidental.)
Delta Beta	March 10, 1928 – April 10, 1938	Muhlenberg College	Allentown, Pennsylvania	Merged (ΣΦΕ)	(Note: Chapter was created from the Druids Club (local), a group that dated from 1923. Name similarity to the national fraternity, ΦΣΦ, formed in 1987 is coincidental. This chapter became the Pennsylvania Iota chapter of Sigma Phi Epsilon in 1938.)
Epsilon Beta	May 11, 1929 – 1935	University of Alabama	Tuscaloosa, Alabama	Inactive	(Note: Chapter was created from Eta Nu (local), a group that dated from 1927.)
Zeta Beta	March 29, 1930 – 1934	Monmouth College	Monmouth, Illinois	Inactive	(Note: Chapter returned to local status as Pi Rho Phi in 1934, apparently ceasing operations in 1937.)
Eta Beta	October 31, 1930 – April 23, 1938	Alabama Polytechnic Institute	Auburn, Alabama	Merged (ΣΦΕ)	(Note: Chapter created from Tau Omega Chi (local), established in 1924.)
Theta Beta	September 23, 1933 – April 23, 1938	Rensselaer Polytechnic Institute	Troy, New York	Merged (ΣΦΕ)	(Note: Chapter originated as Theta Delta Psi (local) in 1925. Three years later, in 1928 it merged into Sigma Zeta, a small, general fraternity formed in 1926 to become its Theta chapter. When that organization failed several years later, the chapter joined Theta Upsilon Omega.) (Note: This chapter became the New York Delta chapter of Sigma Phi Epsilon in 1938.)

== Notable members ==
- Thomas Cunningham Cochran - Republican member of the U.S. House of Representatives from Pennsylvania 1927-1935.
- Paul J. Kramer - American biologist and plant physiologist
- Thomas Z. Minehart - Treasurer of Pennsylvania, Auditor General of Pennsylvania.

== See also ==
- List of social fraternities
