= Jonathan F. Wendel =

American evolutionary biologist and botanist

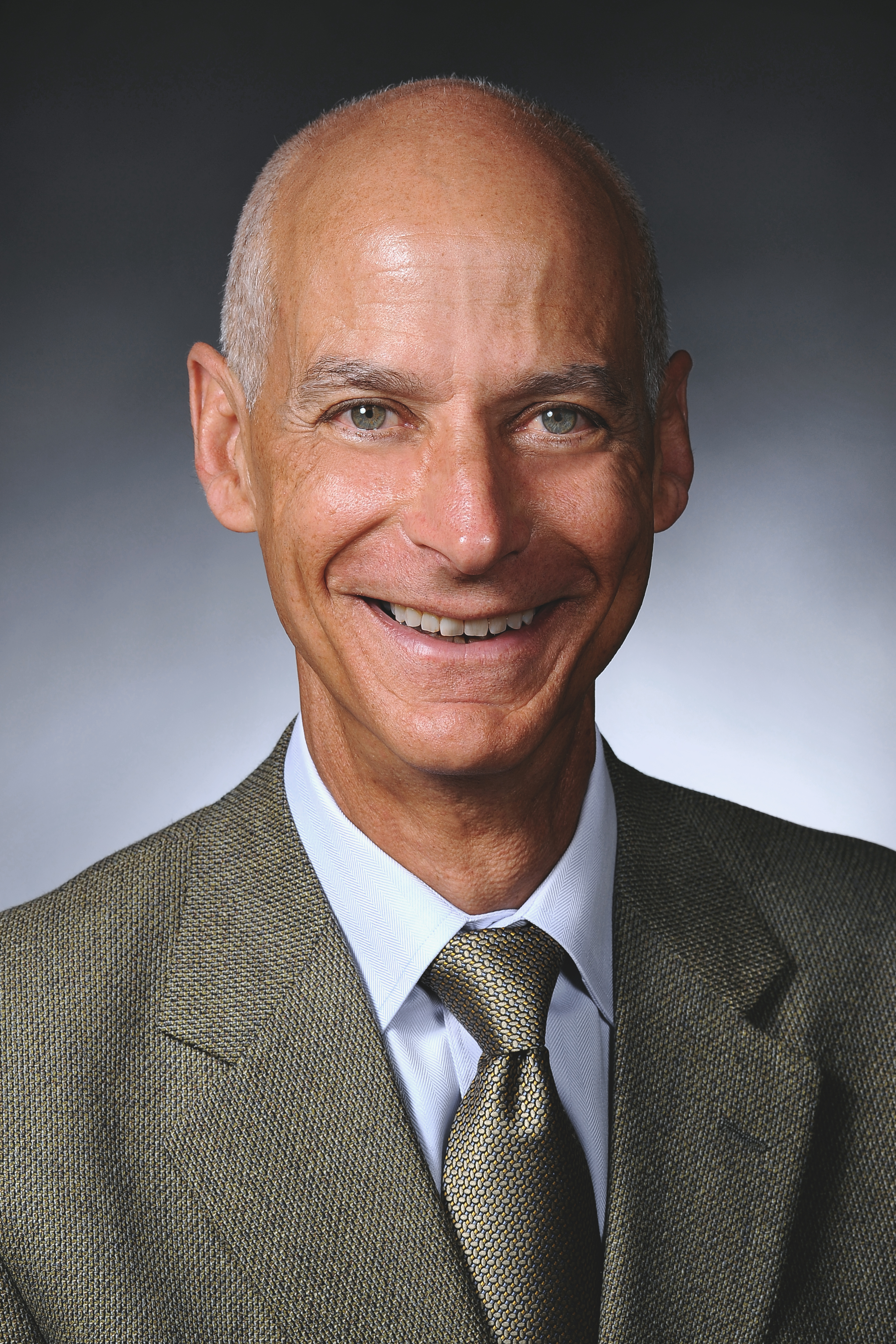
- Education: University of Michigan (BS); University of North Carolina at Chapel Hill (MS, PhD)
- Known for: Research on polyploidy, plant genome evolution, and cotton genomics
- Awards: Member, National Academy of Sciences (2023); Member, American Academy of Arts and Sciences (2023); Fellow, American Association for the Advancement of Science (2010)
- Scientific career
- Fields: Evolutionary biology, Botany, Genomics
- Workplaces: Iowa State University

Jonathan F. Wendel is an American evolutionary biologist and botanist known for his research on plant genome evolution, polyploidy, and the genetics and evolution of cotton (Gossypium). He is Distinguished Professor in the Department of Ecology, Evolution, and Organismal Biology at Iowa State University. His research has contributed to understanding genome duplication, speciation, and the evolutionary consequences of polyploidy in plants.

== Education ==
Wendel received his Bachelor of Science from the University of Michigan in 1976. He then attended the University of North Carolina at Chapel Hill, where he earned a Master of Science in 1980 and a PhD in 1983.

== Career ==
Following completion of his PhD in 1983, Wendel worked as a geneticist with the United States Department of Agriculture Agricultural Research Service at North Carolina State University from 1983 to 1986.

He joined Iowa State University in 1986 as an assistant professor of botany. He was promoted to associate professor in 1991 and full professor in 1996. In 2012, he was appointed Distinguished Professor at Iowa State University. He served as chair of the Department of Ecology, Evolution, and Organismal Biology from 2003 to 2017 and previously served as interim chair from 2002 to 2003.

== Research ==
Wendel's research focuses on plant genomic and phenotypic diversity, with particular emphasis on polyploidy (whole-genome duplication). Much of his work examines the evolutionary consequences of allopolyploidy, in which two diverged diploid genomes become united within a single nucleus. His studies have investigated genomic processes associated with allopolyploid formation and evolution, including intergenomic gene conversion, homoeolog expression bias, duplicate gene co-regulation, expression dominance, biased genome fractionation, and the evolutionary trajectories of duplicated genetic networks.

A major focus of his research has been the cotton genus (Gossypium), which he has used as a model system to examine genome doubling, genome organization, gene expression divergence, and the genetic basis of domestication and crop traits. His work has contributed to understanding how duplicated genes and regulatory networks evolve following genome merger and doubling.

In addition to cotton, Wendel has conducted research on other plant groups, including maize (Zea mays), rice (Oryza), bamboos, and baobabs (Adansonia), using molecular and genomic approaches to study phylogenetic relationships, polyploidy, and plant diversification.

== Honors and awards ==
- 1990 – Margaret Menzel Award for Best Paper, Botanical Society of America
- 1999 – Outstanding Achievement in Research, Iowa State University
- 2005 – Master Teacher Award, College of Liberal Arts and Sciences at Iowa State University
- 2009 – Outstanding Achievement in Departmental Leadership, Iowa State University
- 2010 – Elected Fellow, American Association for the Advancement of Science
- 2012 – Cotton Biotechnology Award, Cotton Incorporated
- 2015 – Distinguished Fellow, Botanical Society of America
- 2015 – Distinguished Scholar, Crop Science Society of America
- 2019 – Leverhulme Professorship, Royal Botanic Gardens, Kew and Queen Mary University of London
- 2019 – Fulbright Senior Scholar, Spain
- 2021 – Researcher of the Year, International Cotton Advisory Committee
- 2023 – Elected Member, American Academy of Arts and Sciences
- 2023 – Elected Member, National Academy of Sciences
- 2024 – Cotton Genetics Research Award, National Cotton Council of America

== Selected publications ==
- Wendel, J. F. (1989). "New World tetraploid cottons contain Old World cytoplasm". Proceedings of the National Academy of Sciences of the United States of America. 86: 4132–4136.
- Wendel, J. F.; Schnabel, A.; Seelanan, T. (1995). "Bidirectional interlocus concerted evolution following allopolyploid speciation in cotton (Gossypium)". Proceedings of the National Academy of Sciences of the United States of America. 92: 280–284.
- Wendel, J. F. (2000). "Genome evolution in polyploids". Plant Molecular Biology. 42: 225–249.
- Adams, K.; Cronn, R.; Percifield, R.; Wendel, J. F. (2003). "Genes duplicated by polyploidy show unequal contributions to the transcriptome and organ-specific reciprocal silencing". Proceedings of the National Academy of Sciences of the United States of America. 100: 4649–4654.
- Doyle, J. J.; Flagel, L. A.; Paterson, A. H.; Rapp, R.; Soltis, D. E.; Soltis, P. S.; Wendel, J. F. (2008). "Evolutionary genetics of genome merger and doubling in plants". Annual Review of Genetics. 42: 443–461.
- Rapp, R. A.; Udall, J. A.; Wendel, J. F. (2009). "Genomic expression dominance in allopolyploids". BMC Biology. 7: 18.
- Yoo, M.-J.; Wendel, J. F. (2014). "Comparative evolutionary and developmental dynamics of the cotton (Gossypium hirsutum) fiber transcriptome". PLOS Genetics. 10 (1): e1004073.
- Wendel, J. F. (2015). "The wondrous cycles of polyploidy in plants". American Journal of Botany. 102: 1753–1756.
- Wendel, J. F.; Jackson, S. A.; Meyers, B. C.; Wing, R. A. (2016). "Evolution of plant genome architecture". Genome Biology. 17: 37.
- Wendel, J. F.; Lisch, D.; Hu, G.; Mason, A. S. (2018). "The long and short of doubling down: polyploidy, epigenetics, and the temporal dynamics of genome fractionation". Current Opinion in Genetics & Development. 49: 1–7.
- Hu, G.; Wendel, J. F. (2019). "Cis-trans controls and regulatory novelty accompanying allopolyploidization". New Phytologist. 221: 1691–1700.
- Nieto-Feliner, G.; Casacuberta, J.; Wendel, J. F. (2020). "Genomics of evolutionary novelty in hybrids and polyploids". Frontiers in Genetics. 11 : 792 https://doi.org/10.3389/fgene.2020.00792
- Yuan, D.; Grover, C. E.; Hu, G.; Wendel, J. F. (2021). "Parallel and intertwining threads of domestication in allopolyploid cotton (Gossypium)". Advanced Science. https://doi.org/10.1002/advs.202003634
- Viot, C. R.; Wendel, J. F. (2023). "Evolution of the cotton genus Gossypium and its domestication in the Americas: a review". Critical Reviews in Plant Sciences.42: 1-33 https://doi.org/10.1080/07352689.2022.2156061
- Grover, C.; Wendel, J. F. (2025). "A high-resolution model of gene expression during Gossypium hirsutum fiber development". BMC Genomics. 26: 221 https://doi.org/10.1186/s12864-025-11360-z
- Wendel, Jonathan F.; et al. (2026). "Genomic diversity and the domestication history of cotton (Gossypium hirsutum)". Proceedings of the National Academy of Sciences. 123 (21). doi:10.1073/pnas.2607107123.
