= Ralph Bock =

German university teacher (born 1967)

Ralph Bock (born October 8, 1967 in Wolfen) is a German molecular biologist who researches in plant physiology.

== Education and career ==
After graduating from the University of Halle in 1993, Bock moved to the University of Freiburg, where he received his doctorate in 1996. Part of his study was carried out at Rutgers University in the lab of Pal Maliga's. After habilitation, Bock headed a research group in Freiburg and became a professor in 1999. In 2001, Bock accepted a faculty position at the University of Münster as director and professor at the Institute for Plant Biochemistry and Biotechnology.

In 2004, Bock moved to Potsdam as Director at the Max Planck Institute for Molecular Plant Physiology; there he heads the Department of Organelle Biology, Biotechnology and Molecular Ecophysiology. Since 2005 he has also been an honorary professor at the University of Potsdam and since 2016 at the Hubei University, Wuhan in China.

== Honors and awards ==
In 2010, Bock became a member of the German Academy of Sciences Leopoldina. In 2021, he became a fellow of the Berlin-Brandenburg Academy of Sciences.
