= Linoleate 9S-lipoxygenase =

Identifiers
- EC no.: 1.13.11.58

Databases
- IntEnz: IntEnz view
- BRENDA: BRENDA entry
- ExPASy: NiceZyme view
- KEGG: KEGG entry
- MetaCyc: metabolic pathway
- PRIAM: profile
- PDB structures: RCSB PDB PDBe PDBsum
Search
- PMC: articles
- PubMed: articles
- NCBI: proteins

Linoleate 9S-lipoxygenase (EC 1.13.11.58, 9-lipoxygenase, 9S-lipoxygenase, linoleate 9-lipoxygenase, LOX1 (gene), 9S-LOX) is an enzyme with systematic name linoleate:oxygen 9S-oxidoreductase. This enzyme catalyses the following chemical reaction

linoleate + O_{2} $\rightleftharpoons$ (9S,10E,12Z)-9-hydroperoxy-10,12-octadecadienoate

Linoleate 9S-lipoxygenase contains nonheme iron.
