= Paul J. Kramer =

American plant biologist

Paul Jackson Kramer (May 8, 1904 – May 24, 1995) was an American biologist and plant physiologist.

== Life and career ==
Kramer was born in Brookville, Indiana. He received a doctorate in plant physiology from the Ohio State University in 1931, and the same year joined Duke University as an instructor. He stayed there until his retirement in 1974 as James B. Duke Professor emeritus. He graduated from Miami University in 1926 where he was a member of Theta Upsilon Omega fraternity.

Kramer was a member of the National Academy of Sciences, a member of the American Academy of Arts and Sciences, and a fellow of the Australian Academy of Science. The American Philosophical Society, of which he was a member, called him "a world-renowned plant physiologist" and "a world leader in the fundamentals of the water relations of plants".

Kramer was a recipient of the Distinguished Service Award of the American Institute of Biological Sciences. Other awards included: an award of merit from the Botanical Society of America, an achievement award from the Society of American Foresters, and a Barnes Life Membership in the American Society of Plant Physiologists. He had honorary degrees from the University of North Carolina, Miami University, Ohio State University, and l'Université Paris VII.

He was married to Edith Vance Kramer, with whom he had two children, Jean Findeis and Richard.
