= Sigma Phi Epsilon =

North American collegiate fraternity

- ΣΦΕ
- Founded: November 1, 1901; 125 years ago Richmond College
- Type: Social
- Affiliation: Independent
- Former affiliation: NIC
- Status: Active
- Scope: National
- Motto: "Building Balanced Men"
- Pillars: Virtue, Diligence, and Brotherly Love
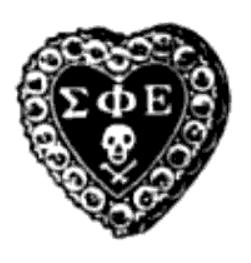
- Member badge
- Colors: Red, Purple, and Gold
- Flag
- Flower: Violet and Dark Red Rose
- Philanthropy: Big Brothers Big Sisters
- Chapters: 221
- Members: 14,105 active 325,252 lifetime
- Headquarters: Zollinger House; 310 S. Boulevard; Richmond, Virginia 23220; United States
- Website: www.sigep.org

Sigma Phi Epsilon (ΣΦΕ), commonly known as SigEp, is a social college fraternity for male college students in the United States. It was founded on November 1, 1901, at Richmond College, which is now the University of Richmond, and its national headquarters remains in Richmond, Virginia. It was founded on three principles: Virtue, Diligence, and Brotherly Love (often abbreviated as "VDBL"). Sigma Phi Epsilon is one of the largest social fraternities in the United States in terms of current undergraduate membership.

== History ==
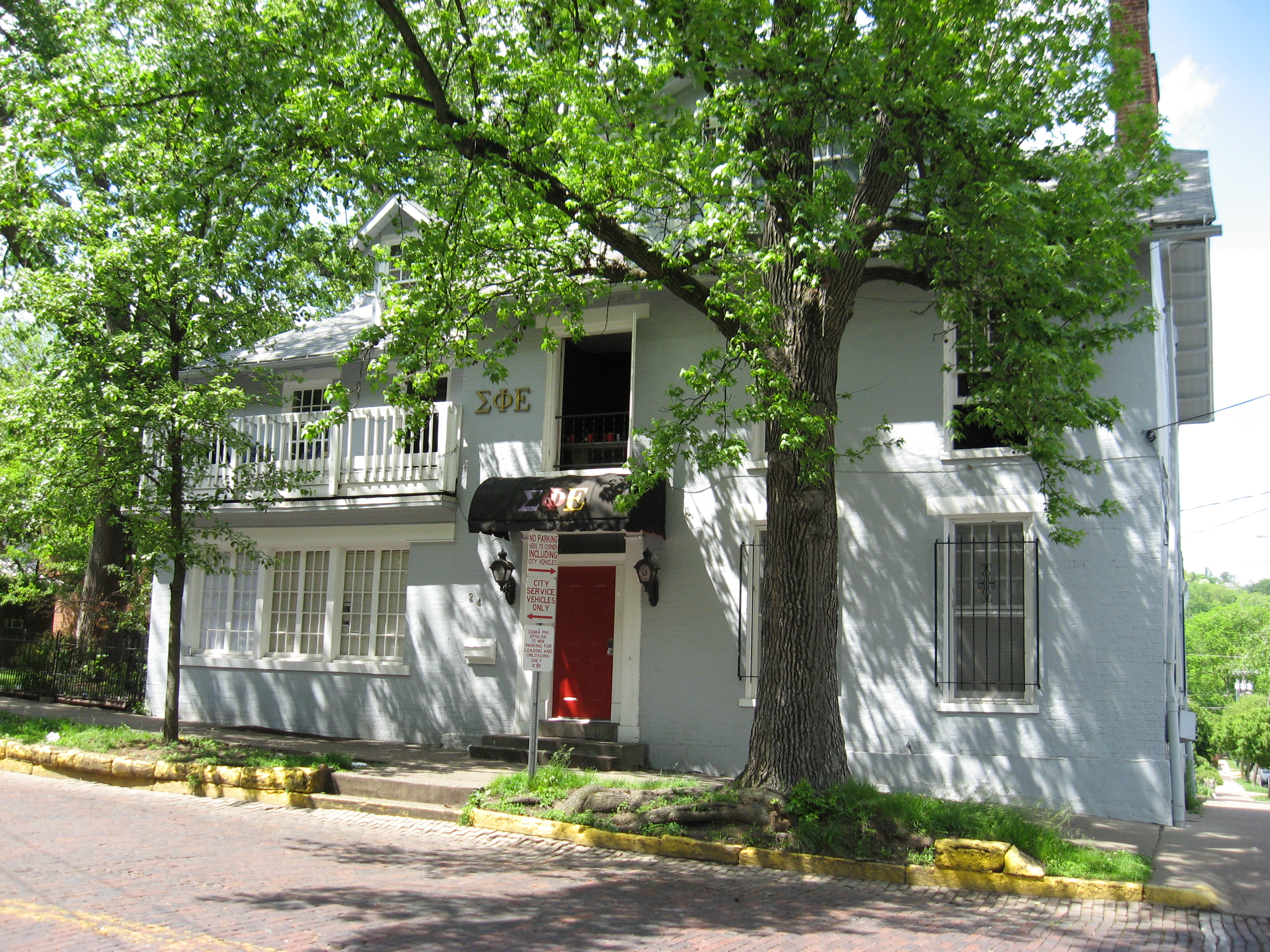
The Sigma Phi Epsilon house at Ohio University in Athens, Ohio

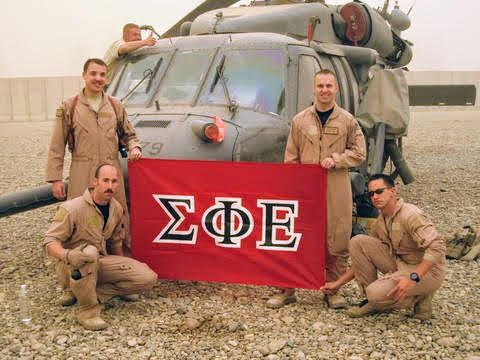
U.S. military personnel display the Sigma Phi Epsilon flag in Iraq in May 2009

In the fall of 1900 18-year-old divinity student Carter Ashton Jenkens, the son of a Baptist minister, transferred from Rutgers College in New Brunswick, New Jersey, to Richmond College, a Baptist institution in Richmond, Virginia. At Rutgers Jenkens had been initiated into the Chi Phi fraternity. At Richmond, which did not have a chapter of Chi Phi, Jenkens was part of a group of friends who were meeting regularly under the unofficial name the "Saturday Night Club".

By early October 1901, Jenkens had persuaded the group, which had grown to twelve men, to try to establish a chapter of Chi Phi at Richmond. These men were reportedly spurned by the existing fraternities on campus for their sense of morality (seven of the twelve were studying for the ordained ministry) and for their rural, middle-class backgrounds. Jenkens had convinced the others that their chapter could be different from the other fraternities on campus and assured them that Chi Phi's principles were in line with their own. The group's request for a charter, however, was met with refusal as the national fraternity felt that Richmond College was too small to host a Chi Phi chapter. Jenkens and his friends therefore founded their own fraternity.

After several secret meetings throughout October 1901, the new fraternity took shape and on November 1, 1901, the fraternity's first membership roster was publicly posted at the school. It listed the twelve founding members in this order: Carter Ashton Jenkens, Benjamin Donald Gaw, William Hugh Carter, William Andrew Wallace, Thomas Temple Wright, William Lazelle Phillips, Lucian Baum Cox, Richard Spurgeon Owens, Edgar Lee Allen, Robert Alfred McFarland, Franklin Webb Kerfoot, and Thomas Vaden McCaul. After much discussion, the group settled on a secret motto and called their fraternity Sigma Phi.

Jenkens, Gaw, and Phillips then met with a faculty committee to seek official recognition for their new fraternity. The faculty members were reluctant to recognize a sixth fraternity in a school with only 300 students, especially as more than half the members would be soon-to-graduate seniors. Additionally, another national fraternity already existed using the name Sigma Phi. The founders responded that their new fraternity would be different from the others at Richmond, as was being founded upon biblical, egalitarian principles, and new members would quickly be taken in from the undergraduate classes to increase the new fraternity's size, and the fraternity's name was still open to debate. With these assurances from the founders, the faculty committee approved the new fraternity's request for official recognition. Shortly afterward, the founders met and decided to rename the fraternity Sigma Phi Epsilon.

In November 2019, Sigma Phi Epsilon withdrew from the North American Interfraternity Council, stating that the national organization was not doing enough to limit hazing and alcohol abuse.

== Symbols ==
The colors dark red and royal purple were chosen to represent fraternity, while the golden heart was chosen as the fraternity's symbol. The principles of Virtue, Diligence, and Brotherly Love, were chosen as "The Three Cardinal Principles". The fraternity's badge is a golden heart surmounted by a black enameled heart-shaped shield. Upon the shield are inscribed, in gold, the Greek letters of the fraternity, ΣΦΕ, and below these letters, a skull and crossbones.

Chapter house doors are traditionally painted red. The tradition of the red door on Sigma Phi Epsilon Chapter houses began at Syracuse University (New York Alpha) in the 1920s. Brothers there painted the front door of their house red as a token of fraternalism because it is a fraternity color. Today, all 260 SigEp chapters have red doors.

== Membership ==
In December 2014, Sigma Phi Epsilon became the first fraternity in the North American Interfraternity Conference to accept transgender men as members. The National Board of Directors passed the policy by an 8-0 majority vote with three abstentions.

== Local chapter and member misconduct ==
In 1997, the chapter at San Diego State University was shut down for several years after a pledge nearly died due to a hazing ritual.

In 2002, the chapter at Wake Forest University was suspended for several years after a "drunk, dehydrated and severely sunburned pig" was found at a park after the fraternity held an event there.

In 2007, four members of the fraternity were arrested from Florida State University for hazing after police found 31 pledges shivering in 30-degree weather and covered in raw eggs, catfish-stink bait, flour, and vinegar, and their bodies were red with welts.

In 2011, three Sigma Phi Epsilon members from East Carolina University were arrested and charged with several offenses for possession of 49 grams of marijuana, three Adderall pills, and a dozen stolen street signs at their fraternity house.

In December 2011, the chapter at the University of Vermont in Burlington, Vermont was suspended and criticized for circulating a survey that asked fraternity members "If I could rape someone, who would it be?" Feminist groups on campus fought to have the fraternity permanently removed from campus for preying on women and encouraging sexual assault.

In 2013, the fraternity was suspended for two years at Southern Methodist University in Dallas after torturing a Hispanic fraternity member of Lambda Chi Alpha for four hours. Four Sigma Phi Epsilon members were arrested and charged with assault for kicking, punching, spraying Formula 409 on wounds and cuts, making racist comments, and holding the Lambda Chi Alpha member captive against his will.

In January 2014, 178 grams of marijuana and .21 grams of cocaine were seized from the fraternity house at University of North Carolina at Chapel Hill. One fraternity member was arrested and charged for drug possession and intent to sell.

In February 2014, two sexual assaults were reported at the Yale University chapter house in New Haven, Connecticut one block from campus. The fraternity released a statement stating they had allowed their facility to be used by another student group for a private event. According to the fraternity, the allegations were not made against members of the chapter.

In April 2014, the University of Mississippi chapter was closed after three of its members were found guilty of draping a noose around the statue of James Meredith, the first black student to attend the university. A thorough investigation of the chapter also uncovered the fraternity was guilty of brutally hazing pledges and providing alcohol to underage students.

In September 2014, pledge Tucker Hipps, of Clemson University was found dead in Lake Hartwell after his pledge brothers reported him missing. Hipps' death was not proven to be a result of hazing. However, in February 2015, the university suspended the chapter for five years for alleged violations of the student organization conduct.

In September 2015, a Sigma Phi Epsilon member at the West Virginia University (WVU) was arrested for allegedly raping a WVU female student at the fraternity's chapterhouse.

In October 2015, Sigma Phi Epsilon revoked the charter of the Jacksonville State University chapter due to hazing and other alleged actions including racism and sexual misconduct. The university had ordered the chapter to cease operations for three years and remove itself off-campus if the chapter was to be re-activated.

In August 2016, member Daniel Drill-Mellum was sentenced to 74 months in prison after pleading guilty to two counts of rape.

In October 2022, the chapter at the University of Miami in Coral Gables, Florida was shut down after a video surfaced of chapter members chanting about having sex with a dead woman.

In February 2024, the chapter at Davidson College was suspended for five years after they admitted to Davidson officials of hazing pledges in spring 2023. The fraternity attempted to appeal the suspension for a lesser consequence but Davidson ultimately decided to uphold the suspension.

In April 2024, the chapter at University of North Carolina at Greensboro was suspended for 10 years after an investigation found recruiting and hazing violations. There were no publicly shared details of the violations.

== See also ==
- List of social fraternities and sororities
