= Ralph H. Wetmore =

Professor of Botany at Harvard University from 1926 until 1962

Ralph Hartley Wetmore (April 27, 1892 – April 28, 1989) was a professor of botany at Harvard University from 1926 until 1962, known for his studies of plant growth and development. He was a fellow of the American Association for the Advancement of Science, American Academy of Arts and Sciences, National Academy of Sciences, and the New York Academy of Science, and served as president of the Botanical Society of America. Wetmore was born in Yarmouth, Nova Scotia, and attended Acadia University, earning a bachelor's degree in 1921. He earned a Phd at Harvard in 1924, working under E. C. Jeffrey, and joined the Harvard faculty in 1926. He was married to Marion G. Silver from 1923 until her death in 1935, and in 1940 married Olive (Hawkins) Smith, who later became acting dean of Radcliffe College. Wetmore had two daughters from his first marriage. He died in Boxford, Massachusetts, at the age of 97.
