= Barbara Baker (molecular biologist) =

American plant molecular geneticist

Barbara Joan Baker
- Education: University of California, San Francisco
- Awards: Member of the National Academy of Sciences (2021)
- Scientific career
- Workplaces: Plant Gene Expression Center, USDA Agricultural Research Service and University of California, Berkeley
- Thesis: Analysis of endogenous avian retrovirus DNA and RNA: viral and cellular determinants of retrovirus gene expression (1981)
- Website: bakerlab.berkeley.edu/bbaker

Barbara Joan Baker is an American plant molecular geneticist working at the University of California, Berkeley and the United States Department of Agriculture, as part of the Plant Gene Expression Center in Albany, California. She was elected to the National Academy of Sciences in 2021.

== Education and career ==
Baker graduated from Los Alamitos High School in 1970 and completed her undergraduate studies at UC San Diego in 1974. She went on to earn her PhD at UC San Francisco with J. Michael Bishop and Harold E. Varmus in 1981, and did postdoctoral research in Germany. As of 2021, Baker is an adjunct professor at the University of California, Berkeley and a senior scientist at the United States Department of Agriculture.

== Research ==
Baker is a plant geneticist working on plant innate immunity, the mechanism by which plants protect themself from diseases. Baker's research includes cloning the N gene for resistance to tobacco mosaic virus and analysis of its TIR domain; this was one of the first plant disease resistance genes (R genes) cloned. She is also known for her research on the roles of R genes in defense against plant pathogens. Baker has also examined the genetic conditions behind the susceptibility to disease in flowering plants in the genus Solanum, including potatoes and tomatoes.

=== Selected publications ===
- Baker, Barbara; Schell, Jeff; Lörz, Horst; Fedoroff, Nina (1986-07-01). "Transposition of the maize controlling element "Activator" in tobacco". Proceedings of the National Academy of Sciences. 83 (13): 4844–4848. Bibcode:1986PNAS...83.4844B. doi:10.1073/pnas.83.13.4844. ISSN 0027-8424. PMC 323839. PMID 16593722.
- Whitham, Steve; Dinesh-Kumar, S.P.; Choi, Doil; Hehl, Reinhard; Corr, Catherine; Baker, Barbara (1994). "The product of the tobacco mosaic virus resistance gene N: Similarity to toll and the interleukin-1 receptor". Cell. 78 (6): 1101–1115. doi:10.1016/0092-8674(94)90283-6. ISSN 0092-8674. PMID 7923359. S2CID 41173100.
- Baker, Barbara; Zambryski, Patricia; Staskawicz, Brian; Dinesh-Kumar, S. P. (1997-05-02). "Signaling in Plant-Microbe Interactions". Science. 276 (5313): 726–733. doi:10.1126/science.276.5313.726. PMID 9115193.
- Whitham, S.; McCormick, S.; Baker, B. (1996-08-06). "The N gene of tobacco confers resistance to tobacco mosaic virus in transgenic tomato". Proceedings of the National Academy of Sciences. 93 (16): 8776–8781. Bibcode:1996PNAS...93.8776W. doi:10.1073/pnas.93.16.8776. ISSN 0027-8424. PMC 38750. PMID 8710948.

== Awards ==
- Elected member, National Academy of Sciences (2021)
