= Julian Schroeder =

- Born: New Jersey, U.S.
- Spouse: Marion Spors
- Children: Julia and Nicola
- Awards: Presidential Young Investigator Award

Academic background
- Education: BSc, MSc, PhD, University of Göttingen
- Thesis: K+-Kanaele in der Plasmamembran von Schliesszellen. Eine Patch-Clamp Untersuchung molekularer Mechanismen des K + Transportes in h6heren Pflanzenzellen.

Julian I. Schroeder is an American biologist. He is a Distinguished Professor and Novartis Chair at the University of California, San Diego. Schroeder's research involves identifying the basic molecular mechanisms by which plants respond to and mount resistance to environmental stresses, with a focus on drought, salinity, and the rising atmospheric CO_{2} concentration.

== Early life and education ==
Schroeder was born and raised in New Jersey before moving to Germany with his family when he was 11 years old. He completed undergraduate studies in physics at the University of Göttingen and his M.S. (Diplom) and PhD working with Erwin Neher at the Max Planck Institute for Biophysical Chemistry and the University of Göttingen. During his postdoctoral fellowship at the University of California, Los Angeles, Schroeder developed an interest in the signaling mechanisms by which plants respond to abiotic stresses.

== Career ==
Following his postdoctoral fellowship, Schroeder joined the Department of Biology at the University of California, San Diego (UCSD). In his early years at UCSD, he focused on the elucidation of molecular mechanisms of ion transport and primary events in environmental and hormonal signal transduction in higher plant cells. He subsequently received a Presidential Young Investigator Award in 1991 from the National Science Foundation (NSF) to fund his research. In 1997, Schroeder received the Charles Albert Shull Award from the American Society of Plant Biologist for his "original and innovative research on plant ion channels, guard cell signal transduction, and mineral uptake." Schroeder was part of a team that later received a 2000 NSF Genome Award for his project "Gene Discovery in Aid of Plant Nutrition, Human Health and Environmental Remediation." Later, Schroeder used the plant model Arabidopsis to determine how plants bioaccumulate and detoxify heavy metals from contaminated soils on a commercially viable scale. He was elected a Fellow of the American Association for the Advancement of Science in 2006 for his "elucidation of the mechanisms of ion transport through the plasma membrane of plant cells and of the signal transduction pathways leading to stomatal closure." In 2009, Schroeder was part of a scientific team which identified protein sensors that relay signals to cells that help plants cope with drought stress. The discovery was named by the editors of Science as one of the top 10 Breakthroughs of the Year for 2009.

Schroeder's research involves identifying the basic molecular mechanisms by which plants respond to and mount resistance to environmental stresses, with a focus on drought, salinity, and the rising atmospheric CO_{2} concentration. In 2012, Schroeder and Stephen Mayfield were named founding co-directors of the Center for Food and Fuel for the 21st Century (FF-21). In this new role, his research led to the discovery of a sodium transporter that played a key role in protecting plants from salt stress. Schroeder was elected to a one-year term as president of the American Society of Plant Biologists from 2014 to 2015. As a result of his research accomplishments, he was elected a Member of the National Academy of Sciences for having "pioneered the characterization of ion channels in higher plants." He was elected to the Leopoldina, the German National Academy of Sciences. Since 2015 Schroeder has been among those named in the listing of "The World's Most Influential Scientific Minds" by Thomson Reuters.

In March 2019, Schroeder was awarded a Khalifa International Award for Date Palm and Agricultural Innovation for his basic research achievements in plant drought and salt tolerance, as well as research on improving the water use efficiency of plants. The following year, he received the 2020 Stephen Hales Prize by the American Society of Plant Biologists for "making successive fundamental discoveries in plant biology and mentoring generations of younger scientists, many of whom are themselves now leaders in their fields." He received the 2022 Carl Friedrich von Siemens Research Award from the Alexander von Humboldt Foundation.
