= College of Liberal Arts and Sciences =

College of Liberal Arts and Sciences may refer to:

- an academic division or unit of a larger university; sometimes called College of Arts and Sciences
- a stand-alone college offering liberal arts and sciences studies such as in a Liberal arts college
