= Plant Gene Expression Center =

USDA research center in Albany, California

The Plant Gene Expression Center (PGEC) is a research center in Albany, California. It was established in 1987 as a cooperative venture between the Agricultural Research Service of the United States Department of Agriculture and the University of California, Berkeley. The center focuses on plant molecular biology and gene regulation.

== History ==
The PGEC began operations in 1987. Abelson described the center in Science as a USDA program located in an academic setting, set up with the aim of accelerating the use of recombinant DNA technologies in plants by USDA scientists. The Science article described the center as emphasizing basic research rather than short-term commercial outcomes. Founding director Gerald G. Still said in 2007 that PGEC emerged from USDA efforts in the late 1970s and early 1980s to strengthen basic plant biology research. Still described PGEC as a joint federal-academic research model focused on plant gene expression and development, and he said that this "blending of two diverse institutional cultures" was unusual and led to greater productivity. To get started, the center recruited a small group of principal investigators and provided centralized facilities.

== Organization ==
The PGEC is located at the USDA Western Regional Research Center in Albany, California. The center is jointly associated with USDA ARS and UC Berkeley. PGEC principal investigators may hold both USDA and UC Berkeley affiliations, while graduate students and postdoctoral researchers from UC Berkeley conduct research at the center. Former director Still described the center as a way to connect federal laboratories, universities, and the wider plant science community.

== Research and associated researchers ==
Research areas at the PGEC include gene expression, plant development, and physiological responses in plants, with program areas including transcriptional regulation, signal transduction, and responses to environmental and hormonal cues. The PGEC has emphasized basic research in plant molecular biology from its start. Still’s 2007 account connected early PGEC work with plant gene cloning, functional characterization of plant genes, transgenic plant systems, and molecular genetic approaches in plants. Current research at the site includes light signaling, hormone-regulated growth, reproductive development, and stress responses.

The center has also focused on the development of molecular tools and materials intended for use by plant geneticists and breeders. As part of this work, both its researchers and collaborating researchers have sought to apply these approaches and resources to agriculturally important problems.

Several ARS scientists associated with PGEC have been elected members of the National Academy of Sciences, including Sarah Hake, Barbara Baker, Athanasios Theologis, and Peter Quail. Researchers associated with the PGEC in its early years included Sheila M. McCormick, Michael F. Fromm, and David W. Ow.
