= Emanuel Epstein =

American plant physiologist (1916–2022)

- Born: November 5, 1916; Germany
- Died: December 4, 2022 (aged 106); Davis, California, United States
- Education: University of California, Davis (BS, MS); University of California, Berkeley (PhD)
- Known for: Plant mineral nutrition Root ion transport Silicon in plant biology
- Awards: Guggenheim Fellowship; Fulbright Fellowship; US National Academy of Sciences
- Scientific career
- Fields: Plant physiology Plant biochemistry
- Workplaces: University of California, Davis

Emanuel Epstein (November 5, 1916 – December 4, 2022) was a German-born American plant physiologist and biochemist who spent most of his academic career at the University of California, Davis. He was a leading figure in the study of plant mineral nutrition and root physiology, and is widely regarded as a major contributor to the modern understanding of ion transport in plant cells. Epstein was elected to the National Academy of Sciences and remained scientifically active well into his later years, living to the age of 106.

== Early life and education ==
Emanuel Epstein was born on November 5, 1916, in Germany. As a Jewish child growing up in Europe during the interwar period, he experienced the rising restrictions and persecution of the 1930s, prompting his family to leave Germany while he was still young. He spent part of his youth in Palestine before eventually emigrating to the United States, a trajectory that shaped both his personal life and educational opportunities.

Epstein pursued higher education in the United States at UC Davis, where he earned his undergraduate and master's degrees in agriculture and plant sciences. He then completed his doctoral studies in plant physiology at the University of California, Berkeley. His graduate training coincided with the rapid postwar expansion of biochemistry and physiology, and during this period he developed a strong interest in the mechanisms by which plants acquire and regulate mineral nutrients, an interest that would define his subsequent scientific career.

== Research and career ==
After completing his doctoral training, Emanuel Epstein joined the faculty of the UC Davis, where he spent the majority of his academic career. He became a central figure in the development of plant physiology at UC Davis, contributing to both research and graduate education over several decades. Epstein remained scientifically active well beyond formal retirement, continuing to publish and engage with the plant biology community into his later years.

Epstein is best known for his work on plant mineral nutrition, particularly the mechanisms by which plant roots absorb and regulate inorganic ions from the soil. Through physiological, biochemical, and kinetic analyses, he demonstrated that ion uptake occurs via at least two distinct transport systems, an important understanding of nutrient acquisition in plants. This dual-mechanism model became a key part of plant nutrition research and was a foundation for studies of membrane transport and ion selectivity.

In addition to his work on essential mineral nutrients, Epstein made important contributions to the study of silicon in plants. He helped establish silicon as a beneficial element for many plant species, showing that it can enhance growth, stress tolerance, and disease resistance, particularly in grasses and crop plants. His research played a key role in integrating silicon into broader frameworks of plant nutrition and agricultural management.

Beyond his research contributions, Epstein was widely respected as a teacher and mentor. He trained numerous students and postdoctoral researchers who went on to careers in academia, government, and industry. Through his scholarship and mentorship, Epstein exerted a lasting influence on plant physiology and mineral nutrition as disciplines.

== Honors and awards ==
- Elected to the National Academy of Sciences (1987)
- Awarded a John Simon Guggenheim Memorial Foundation Fellowship
- Twice a Senior Fulbright Research Fellow
- Recipient of the ASPB Charles Reid Barnes Award for Life Membership (1986)
