= Patricia Zambryski =

Plant and microbial biologist

- Other name: Patricia C. Zambryski O'Farrell
- Education: University of Colorado Boulder
- Scientific career
- Workplaces: University of California, Berkeley
- Thesis: The Regulation of gene expression during bacteriophage T4 development (1974)

Patricia C. Zambryski is a plant and microbial scientist known for her work on Type IV secretion and cell-to-cell transport in plants. She is also professor emeritus at the University of California, Berkeley.

She was an elected member of the National Academy of Sciences, the American Association for the Advancement of Science, and the American Society for Microbiology.

== Education and career ==
Zambryski received her B.S. from McGill University in 1969, and earned a Ph.D. from the University of Colorado Boulder in 1974.

== Research ==
Zambryski is known for her work in the field of genetic engineering, specifically for her work with Agrobacterium tumefaciens, a bacterium she uses to track the molecular mechanisms that change plants and how plant cells communicate with each other. She has examined the structure of plant cells that have been altered by Agrobacterium tumefaciens. While working in Marc Van Montagu's lab, Zambryski determined how the Ti plasmid is identified by the bacterium, and she developed a vector that allowed the transfer of genetic material into a plant without altering the plant tissue. This advance was used to inject novel genes into plants. She has also examined plasmodesmata, which are the channels that reach across the spaces in plant cells.

== Selected publications ==
- Zambryski, P.; Joos, H.; Genetello, C.; Leemans, J.; Van Montagu, M.; Schell, J. (1983). "Ti plasmid vector for the introduction of DNA into plant cells without alteration of their normal regeneration capacity". The EMBO Journal. 2 (12): 2143–2150. doi:10.1002/j.1460-2075.1983.tb01715.x. PMC 555426. PMID 16453482.
- Stachel, Scott E.; Messens, Eric; Van Montagu, Marc; Zambryski, Patricia (1985). "Identification of the signal molecules produced by wounded plant cells that activate T-DNA transfer in Agrobacterium tumefaciens". Nature. 318 (6047): 624–629. Bibcode:1985Natur.318..624S. doi:10.1038/318624a0. ISSN 0028-0836. S2CID 4287289.
- Baker, Barbara; Zambryski, Patricia; Staskawicz, Brian; Dinesh-Kumar, S. P. (1997-05-02). "Signaling in Plant-Microbe Interactions". Science. 276 (5313): 726–733. doi:10.1126/science.276.5313.726. ISSN 0036-8075. PMID 9115193.
- Zambryski, Patricia; Crawford, Katrina (2000-11-01). "Plasmodesmata: Gatekeepers for Cell-to-Cell Transport of Developmental Signals in Plants". Annual Review of Cell and Developmental Biology. 16 (1): 393–421. doi:10.1146/annurev.cellbio.16.1.393. ISSN 1081-0706. PMID 11031242.
- Stachel, Scott E.; Zambryski, Patricia C. (1986-08-01). "virA and virG control the plant-induced activation of the T-DNA transfer process of A. tumefaciens". Cell. 46 (3): 325–333. doi:10.1016/0092-8674(86)90653-7. ISSN 0092-8674. PMID 3731272. S2CID 37938846.

== Awards and honors ==
In 2001 she was elected a member of the National Academy of Sciences and a fellow of the American Society for Microbiology. In 2010 she was elected a fellow of the American Association for the Advancement of Science.
