= Max Planck Institute of Molecular Plant Physiology =

German research institute for molecular plant physiology

Coordinates: 52.4156°N 12.9689°E

- Abbreviation: MPIMP
- Formation: 1 January 1994; 32 years ago
- Type: Scientific institute
- Purpose: Research in plant physiology at a molecular level
- Headquarters: Golm, Potsdam, Brandenburg, Germany
- Key people: Caroline Gutjahr, Claudia Köhler, Ralph Bock
- Parent organization: Max Planck Society
- Website: (in English)

The Max Planck Institute of Molecular Plant Physiology (German: Max-Planck-Institut für molekulare Pflanzenphysiologie) is a German research institute for molecular plant physiology, based in the Golm district of Potsdam, Brandenburg. Founded on 1 January 1994, the MPIMP focuses on the study of the dynamics of plant metabolism and how that relates to the entire plant system. The institution is one of the 80 institutes in the Max Planck Society (Max-Planck-Gesellschaft).

== Research ==
The MPIP studies the plant metabolism in the context of the whole plant system. It is particularly focused on understanding how the individual components dynamically interact over time and under different conditions. They combine traditional biological approaches with techniques relevant to functional genomics in order to study the structure, function, dynamics, and regulation of plant genomes, proteomes, and metabolomes.

== Organization ==
About 360 people, including students, work at the MPIMP. Currently there are people from more than 30 nations working at the institute. More than half of the employees are female. The institute has three directors, namely, Caroline Gutjahr, Claudia Köhler and Ralph Bock, all leading a specific research department.

=== Board of trustees ===
Alongside the dedicated scientists working within its walls, prominent individuals from industrial, financial, political and cultural circles form its Board of Trustees to strengthen and support the links between our institute and the greater community. The mentioned board overseas the affairs of MPIMP as well as neighboring Max Planck Institute for Colloids and Interfaces also based in Golm. As of February 2014, the following are the members of the Board of Trustees:

- Ulrich Buller - Senior Vice President Research Planning, Fraunhofer Gesellschaft
- Rolf Emmermann - Vice-chairman of the Board of Trustees, GeoForschungsZentrum Potsdam (GFZ)
- Detlev Ganten - Chairman of the Board of Trustees, Chairman of the Board of the Charité - Universitätsmedizin Berlin
- Norbert Glante - Member of the European Parliament
- Jann Jakobs - Mayor of the City of Potsdam
- Wilhelm Krull - Secretary General of the Volkswagen Stiftung
- Sabine Kunst - Minister of Science, Research and Culture, Brandenburg
- Wolfgang Plischke - Member of the Bayer AG board
- Robert Seckler - University of Potsdam

=== Scientific Advisory Board ===
In order to further and reinforce the institute's pursuance for knowledge of molecular plant physiology, MPIMP has collaborated with various experts from different universities around the world:

- Ian Small (Chairman of the Scientific Advisory Board, ARC Centre of Excellence in Plant Energy Biology, University of Western Australia, Perth, Australia)
- Eva-Mari Aro (Department of Biochemistry and Food Chemistry, University of Turku, Finland)
- Julia Bailey-Serres (Department of Botany and Center for Plant Cell Biology, University of California, Riverside, California)
- Christoph Benning (Department of Biochemistry and Molecular Biology, Michigan State University, East Lansing, Michigan)
- Professor Edda Klipp (Department of Biology, Humbold-Universität zu Berlin, Berlin)
- Professor Albrecht E. Melchinger (Institute of Plant Breeding, Seed Science and Population Genetics, University of Hohenheim, Stuttgart, Germany)
- Stefan Schuster (Faculty of Biology and Pharmacy, Friedrich Schiller University of Jena, Germany)
- Alison M. Smith (John Innes Centre, Department of Metabolic Biology, Norwich Research Park, Norwich, United Kingdom)
- Francis-André Wollman (Institute of Physicochemical Biology, National Center for Scientific Research, Paris)

== Departments ==
=== Molecular Physiology ===
The Department of Molecular Physiology is focused on metabolism in its broadest sense, primarily using reverse genetics to alter plants and functional genomic approaches to analyze the pleiotropic effects of these alterations. Under Lothar Willmitzer, Molecular Physiology currently has seven research groups each with a corresponding head in parentheses:

- Genes and Small Molecules (Lothar Willmitzer)
- Amino Acid and Sulfur Metabolism (Rainer Hoefgen)
- Applied Metabolome Analysis (Joachim Kopka)
- Central Metabolism (Alisdair Fernie)
- Experimental Systems Biology (Patrick Giavilisco)
- Systems Biology and Mathematical Modelling (Zoran Nikoloski)
- Systems Metabolomics (Dirk Steinhauser)

=== Metabolic Networks ===
The Metabolic Networks Department studies a wide set of physiological processes involved in orchestrating photosynthetic carbon metabolism, nitrogen and phosphate utilization, growth, and storage. Systems biology will be emphasized and forward and reverse genetic tools will often be used. Under Mark Stitt, the department currently has four research groups:

- System Regulation (Mark Stitt)
- Intercellular Macromolecular Transport (Fritz Kragler)
- Regulatory Networks (Marek Mutwil)
- Plant Proteomics (Alexander Graf)

=== Organelle Biology, Biotechnology and Molecular Ecophysiology ===
The Organelle Biology, Biotechnology and Molecular Ecophysiology Department focuses on plant cell organelles (plastids and mitochondria), their physiology and gene expression as well as their metabolic and genetic interactions with the nucleo-cytosolic compartment. Transgenic technologies for nuclear and organellar genomes are developed and combined with biochemical and physiological methods to elucidate the genetic mechanisms regulating metabolic pathways, the assembly process of membrane protein complexes and structure-function relationships within multiprotein complexes in energy-transducing membranes. Applied research in the department addresses resistance management, metabolic engineering and the production of pharmaceuticals in plants. Other research topics concern the mechanisms of genome evolution in eukaryotes and the genetic and evolutionary processes that underlie the physiological plasticity of plant species, populations and ecosystems. Under Ralph Bock, the department currently has four research groups:

- Organelle Biology and Biotechnology (Ralph Bock)
- Algal Biomineralization (André Scheffel)
- Cytoplasmic and Evolutionary Genetics (Stephan Greiner)
- Photosynthesis Research (Mark Aurel Schöttler)

== See also ==
- List of Max Planck Institutes and Research Groups
