= Trypanosome H/ACA box snoRNAs =

Biomolecule in parasitic microbe

In molecular biology, non-coding RNAs (ncRNA) are RNA molecules that have a function but are not translated into proteins. Small nucleolar RNAs (snoRNAs), one of the largest classes of ncRNA, are further subdivided into the two major C/D and H/ACA snoRNA families. snoRNA serve as guide RNAs for 2'-O-methylation and pseudouridylation of specific nucleotides and indicate the site of modification by direct base pairing with the target RNA. The majority of these snoRNAs are responsible for the post-transcriptional modification of ribosomal RNAs (rRNA) and in some cases of small nuclear RNAs (sRNAs). These post-transcriptional modifications are crucial for rRNA processing, stability and maturation.

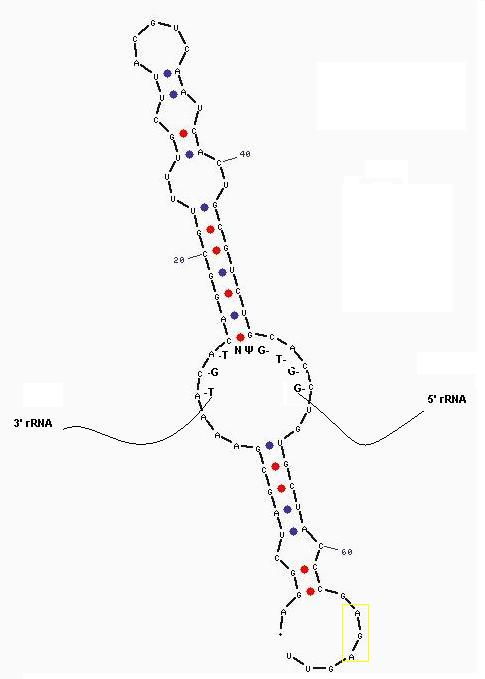
H/ACA with pseudouridylation pocket

The H/ACA snoRNAs that guide pseudouridylation in Trypanosomes consist of a single-hairpin followed by an AGA-box. These H/ACA snoRNA contain a pseudouridylation pocket that guides the H/ACA snoRNA to the correct region of its target rRNA. The pseudouridylation pocket ensures modification of the correct uridine, as it contains two short sequences that are complementary to the target RNA. In addition it is able to basepair with the regions flanking the uridine in need of modification. Trypanosomal snoRNAs differ in both sequence and structure to eukaryotic snoRNAs as they contain one stem loop and an AGA-box at the 3' end. Despite these differences, trypanosomal snoRNAs function identically to eukaryotic snoRNAs and since the discovery of single stem H/ACA snoRNAs in Trypanosomes, similar single hairpin ncRNAs have been discovered in Archea and Euglena. The table below summarizes the H/ACA snoRNAs and the corresponding target sites identified in Trypanosomes.

H/ACA snoRNAs identified in Trypanosomes

| H/ACA ID | Target | Reference |
|---|---|---|
| TB3Cs2H1 | ?308-L5 | Myslyuk et al. 2008 |
| TB3Cs2H2 | ?1658-L5 | Myslyuk et al. 2008 |
| TB8Cs4H1 | ?358-L3 | Myslyuk et al. 2008 |
| TB8Cs4H2 | ?141-L3 | Myslyuk et al. 2008 |
| TB9Cs6H1 | ?199-L5, ?29-5.8S | Myslyuk et al. 2008 |
| TB9Cs6H2 | ?1653-L5 | Myslyuk et al. 2008 |
| TB10Cs5H1 | ?1254-L3 | Myslyuk et al. 2008 |
| TB10Cs5H2 | ?131-S | Myslyuk et al. 2008 |
| TB10Cs5H3 | ?1276-S | Myslyuk et al. 2008 |
| TB11Cs5H1 | ?1710-S | Myslyuk et al. 2008 |
| TB11Cs5H2 | ?176-L3 | Myslyuk et al. 2008 |
| TB11Cs5H3 | ?1314-L3 | Myslyuk et al. 2008 |
| TB6Cs1H1 | ?380-L3 | Liang et al. 2005 |
| TB6Cs1H2 | | Liang et al. 2005 |
| TB6Cs1H3 | ?662-S | Liang et al. 2005 |
| TB6Cs1H4 | ?824-L5 | Liang et al. 2005 |
| TB6Cs2H1 | ?1001-SSU | Liang et al. 2005 |
| TB8Cs2H1 | ?1113-S | Liang et al. 2005 |
| TB8Cs3H1 | ?1423-S | Liang et al. 2005 |
| TB9Cs1H1 | ?1088-S,?1272-L3 | Liang et al. 2005 |
| TB9Cs1H2 | ?1619-S | Liang et al. 2005 |
| TB9Cs1H3 | ?1250-L5 | Liang et al. 2005 |
| TB9Cs2H1 | ?617-L3 | Liang et al. 2005 |
| TB9Cs2H2 | ?1412-L5 | Liang et al. 2005 |
| TB9Cs3H1 | ?1208-L3 | Liang et al. 2005 |
| TB9Cs3H2 | ?1103-L5 | Liang et al. 2005 |
| TB9Cs4H1 | ?2123-S | Liang et al. 2005 |
| TB9Cs4H2 | ?1336-L3 | Liang et al. 2005 |
| TB9Cs4H3 | | Liang et al. 2005 |
| TB10Cs1H1 | ?659-L3 | Liang et al. 2005 |
| TB10Cs1H2 | ?901-L5 | Liang et al. 2005 |
| TB10Cs1H3 | ?40-S | Liang et al. 2005 |
| TB10Cs2H1 | ?1167-L3 | Liang et al. 2005 |
| TB10Cs2H2 | ?1173-L5 | Liang et al. 2005 |
| TB10Cs3H1 | ?263-S | Liang et al. 2005 |
| TB10Cs3H2 | ?397-L3 | Liang et al. 2005 |
| TB10Cs4H1 | ?2248-L5 | Liang et al. 2005 |
| TB10Cs4H2 | ?1186-S | Liang et al. 2005 |
| TB10Cs4H3 | ?1773-L5 | Liang et al. 2005 |
| TB10Cs4H4 | ?505-S | Liang et al. 2005 |
| TB11Cs2H1 | ?28 SL | Liang et al. 2005 |
| TB11Cs3H1 | ?1308-L3 | Liang et al. 2005 |
| TB11Cs3H2 | ?475-L3 | Liang et al. 2005 |
| TB11Cs4H1 | ?1357-L3 | Liang et al. 2005 |
| TB11Cs4H2 | ?566-L3 | Liang et al. 2005 |
| TB11Cs4H3 | ?61-S | Liang et al. 2005 |
