= Arthur R. Grossman =

American biologist (born 1950)

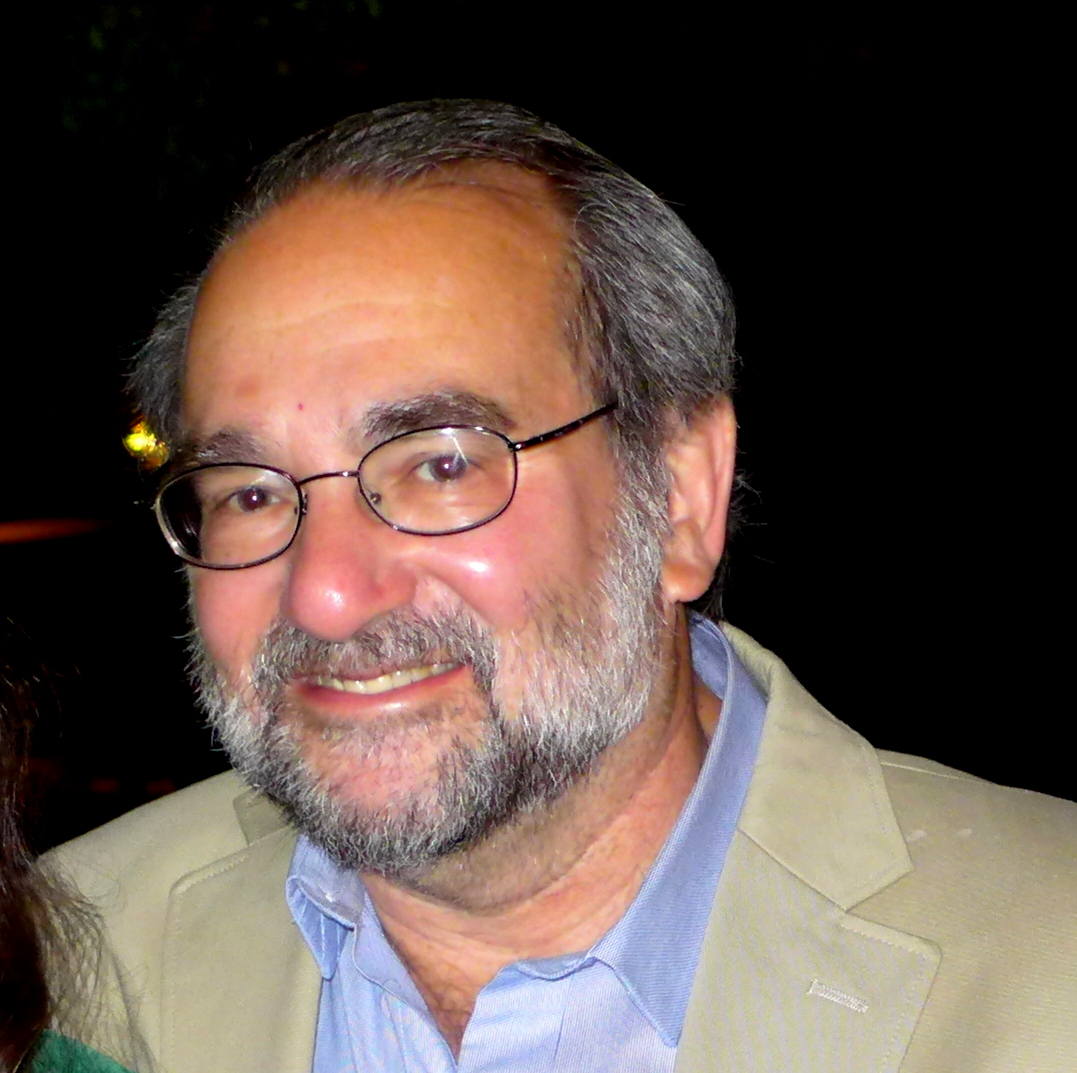
- Education: Brooklyn College; Indiana University
- Known for: Genomics of Chlamydomonas reinhardtii
- Awards: Darbaker Prize; Gilbert Morgan Smith Medal
- Scientific career
- Fields: Plant Biology; Molecular biology Microbiology; Marine biology Phytochemistry; Photosynthesis; Symbiosis
- Workplaces: Carnegie Institution for Science
- Doctoral advisor: Robert Togasaki
- Other academic advisors: Nam-Hai Chua
- Notable students: Peggy Lemaux; Krishna "Kris" Niyogi

Arthur Robert Grossman (born 1950) is an American biologist whose research ranges across the fields of plant biology, microbiology, marine biology, phytochemistry, and photosynthesis. He has been a staff scientist at Carnegie Institution for Science’s Department of Plant Biology since 1982, and holds a courtesy appointment as professor in the Department of Biology at Stanford. He has mentored more than fifteen PhD students and more than thirty post-doctoral fellows. Grossman was the recipient of the Gilbert Morgan Smith Medal (National Academy of Sciences) in 2009 and the Darbaker Prize for work on microalgae (Botanical Society of America) in 2002. He is co-editor in chief of Journal of Phycology, and has been on the editorial boards of major biological journals including the Annual Review of Genetics, Eukaryotic Cell, Journal of Biological Chemistry, and Molecular Plant among others. He has also been on many committees and panels that evaluate scientific directions for the various granting agencies, universities and government departments. He was elected the co-chair of the Gordon Research Conference on Photosynthesis in 2015, and will be chair again in 2017. He is Chief of Genetics at Solazyme Inc. which applies plant biology to create oils.

== Education ==
Grossman received his undergraduate degree in biology with honors, from Brooklyn College (1973), and his Ph.D. in 1978 from Indiana University Bloomington. From 1978 to 1982 he was a postdoctoral fellow at The Rockefeller University, Department of Cell Biology with Nam-Hai Chua. He joined the Department of Plant Biology of the Carnegie Institution for Science as a staff scientist in 1982.

== Scientific contributions ==
Throughout his career, Grossman has focused on understanding the mechanism of microbial photosynthesis, and its role in areas ranging from the ocean environment to applications in biotechnology. Although he has worked with numerous model organisms, he is best known for his work with Chlamydomonas reinhardtii (C. reinhardtii), on which genome project he was co-PI.

== Selected bibliography ==
- Aksoy, M., Pootakham, W., Grossman, A.R. (2014) Critical function of a Chlamydomonas reinhardtii putative vacuolar transporter chaperone during nutrient deprivation. Plant Cell. 26: pages 4214–29.
- Nowack, E., Grossman, A.R. (2012) The Import of the PsaE subunit of photosystem I into the recently established photosynthetic organelles of Paulinella chromatophora. Proceedings of the National Academy of Sciences of the United States of America. 109: pages 5340–5345.
- Merchant, S., Prochnik, S. and the Chlamydomonas Genome Project Team (Rokhsar and Grossman, Corresponding authors) (2007) Chlamydomonas reinhardtii genome reveals evolutionary insights into critical animal- and plant-associated functions. Science 318: pages 245–250.
- Cardol. P., Bailleul, B., Derelle, E., Béal, D., Rappaport, F., Breyton, C., Bailey, S., Wollman, F.-A., Grossman, A.R., Moreau, H., Finazzi, G. (2008) A novel adaptation of photosynthesis in the marine, picoeukaryote Ostreococcus sp. Proceedings of the National Academy of Sciences of the United States of America 105: pages 7881–6.
- Steunou, A.S., Bhaya, D., Bateson, M., Melendrez, M., Ward, D., Brecht, E., Peters, J.W., Kühl, K, Grossman, A.R. (2006) In Situ Analysis of Nitrogen Fixation and Metabolic Switching in Unicellular Thermophilic Cyanobacteria in Hot Spring Microbial Mat. Proceedings of the National Academy of Sciences of the United States of America 103: pages 2398–403.
- Niyogi, K. Björkman, O., Grossman, A.R. (1997) The role of specific xanthophylls in photoprotection. Proceedings of the National Academy of Sciences of the United States of America 94: pages 14162-14167.
- Kehoe, D., Grossman, A.R. (1996) Sensor of chromatic adaptation is similar to phytochrome and ethylene receptor. Science 273: pages 1409-1412.
- Davies, J., Yildiz F., Grossman, A.R. (1996) Sac1, a putative regulator that is critical of survival of Chlamydomonas reinhardtii during sulfur deprivation. EMBO J 15: pages 2150-2159.
- Collier, J., Grossman, A.R. (1994) A small peptide elicits the degradation of phycobilisomes during nutrient-limited growth of cyanobacteria. EMBO J 13: pages 1039-1047.
- Conley, P.B., Lemaux, P.G., Gross, A.R. (1985) Cyanobacterial light-harvesting complex subunits are encoded in two red light-induced transcripts. Science 230: pages 550–553.
- Grossman, A.R., Bartlett, S.G., Chua, N.H. (1980) Energy-dependent uptake of cytoplasmically-synthesized polypeptides by chloroplasts. Nature 285: pages 625–628.
