= Christine Maggs =

British phycologist

Christine A. Maggs
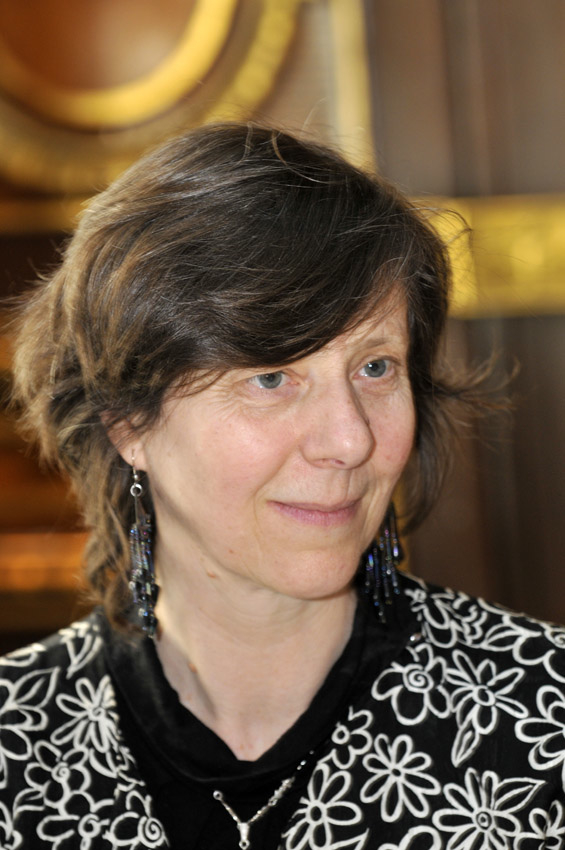
- Born: Christine Adair Maggs; 8 June 1956 (age 70)
- Education: University of Oxford (BA, MA Oxon); NUI Galway (PhD)
- Awards: Elected member Royal Irish Academy (2013); Phycological Society of America Award of Excellence (2014); Phycological Society of America Prescott Award (1995); Phycological Society of America Provasoli award (1994)
- Scientific career
- Fields: phycology; systematics
- Workplaces: University of Oxford; NUI Galway; Queen's University Belfast; Bournemouth University
- Thesis: A phenological study of two maerl beds in Galway Bay, Ireland (1983)
- Website: staffprofiles.bournemouth.ac.uk/display/cmaggs

Christine Adair Maggs (born 8 June 1956) is a British phycologist. Formerly Executive Dean of the Faculty of Science & Technology at Bournemouth University, she was the first Chief Scientist of the Joint Nature Conservation Committee, retiring in 2022. She is now an independent non-executive Director of Ocean Harvest Technology.

== Education ==
Maggs graduated with a Botany degree from St Catherine's College, Oxford in 1978 and a PhD from National University of Ireland, Galway in 1983.

== Research and career ==
Maggs worked as a postdoc at the Atlantic Research Laboratory, Nova Scotia, Canada and Queen's University Belfast (the latter on an Advanced Natural Environment Research Council Fellowship), before taking up a post as a lecturer at Queen's University Belfast in 1995. Her main research interests are molecular systematics of seaweeds with particular interests in alien marine algae and plants, biological conservation, and sustainable seaweed exploitation. The majority of her publications focus on red algae (Rhodophyta), although she has also published on brown algae and green algae, notably showing that Linnaeus was correct in his assertion that the genera Ulva and Enteromorpha were not distinct. She has described two new orders (Ahnfeltiales and Atractophorales) of alga, and three new families (Ahnfeltiaceae, Atractophoraceae, and Haemeschariaceae). She has published over a hundred peer-reviewed scientific papers.

She has written three books on seaweeds: Seasearch Guide to Seaweeds of Britain and Ireland, Green seaweeds of Britain and Ireland, and Seaweeds of the British Isles.

=== Editorial work ===
Professor Maggs has been the Editor-in-Chief of the European Journal of Phycology for 20 years (1994-2004; joint Editor-in-Chief from 2010) and is a Managing Editor of the new BPS journal Applied Phycology, with Prof. Juliet Brodie and Editor-in-Chief Prof. John Beardall. She was associate editor of Journal of Biogeography from 2007-2014, Associate Editor of Journal of Phycology (2009–10), and from 1991-1993 she was Associate Editor of Phycologia, the bi-monthly journal of the International Phycological Society.

=== Diversity work ===
Professor Maggs led the Queen's University Belfast School of Biological Sciences application for an Athena SWAN Gold Award. This successful application made Queen's University Belfast the recipient of only the third departmental Athena SWAN Gold award. In 2017, Professor Maggs was awarded the British Ecological Society Equality and Diversity Champion award.

=== Awards and honours ===
In 2013, Professor Maggs was elected as a member of the Royal Irish Academy. Professor Maggs is a two-time recipient, in 1994 and 2018, of the Phycological Society of America Provasoli award for the most outstanding paper published in the Journal of Phycology. She also received the Phycological Society of America Prescott Award in 1995, and the Phycological Society of America Award of Excellence in 2014.
