= Elisabeth Gantt =

American botanist and phycologist

- Born: 1934 (age 91–92); Yugoslavia
- Education: Blackburn College; Northwestern University
- Known for: Research on photosynthesis, algae, and phycobilisomes
- Awards: Darbaker Prize; Gilbert Morgan Smith Medal
- Scientific career
- Fields: Botany, plant physiology, phycology
- Workplaces: Dartmouth Medical School; Smithsonian Institution; University of Maryland, College Park; Roanoke College

Elisabeth Gantt (born 1934) is an American botanist and plant physiologist known for research on photosynthesis and the structure of algae. Born in Yugoslavia, she immigrated to the United States as a teenager and earned a Ph.D. from Northwestern University in 1963. Her early research included work at Dartmouth Medical School and the Smithsonian Institution on the photosynthetic apparatus of red and blue-green algae, including the identification and characterization of phycobilisomes.

Gantt became a professor at the University of Maryland, College Park, where she was later Distinguished University Professor Emerita. She was elected to the National Academy of Sciences in 1996 and received honors including the Darbaker Prize from the Botanical Society of America and the Gilbert Morgan Smith Medal of the National Academy of Sciences. In 1988, she became the first woman president of the American Society of Plant Biologists.

== Early life and education ==
Gantt was born in 1934 in Yugoslavia, in a town near what is now the Serbian-Hungarian border. She was raised in Gakovo, Serbia, where she completed her first three elementary grades before her education was interrupted by World War II. After the war, she and her family lived in refugee camps in Czechoslovakia and Germany before immigrating to the United States and settling in Chicago.

Gantt attended Blackburn College, where she studied science and later worked as a teaching assistant. She earned a Ph.D. from Northwestern University in 1963.

== Career and research ==
After completing her Ph.D., Gantt conducted research at Dartmouth Medical School, where she studied the photosynthetic apparatus of red and blue-green algae. She later worked at the Smithsonian Institution's Radiation Biology Laboratory, where she identified and characterized phycobilisomes, photosynthetic complexes found in red algae and cyanobacteria.

Gantt subsequently joined the University of Maryland, College Park, where she became a Distinguished University Professor and later Distinguished University Professor Emerita. Her research focused on photosynthesis, algae, plant physiology, and cell biology. After retiring in 2007, she continued research as an emerita professor and later at Roanoke College.

== Honors and service ==
Gantt received the Darbaker Prize from the Botanical Society of America and the Gilbert Morgan Smith Medal from the National Academy of Sciences. She was elected to the National Academy of Sciences in 1996.

In 1978, Gantt served as the president of the Phycological Society of America.

In 1988, Gantt became the first woman president of the American Society of Plant Biologists. She has also served with scientific organizations including the National Research Council, the American Association for the Advancement of Science, and the American Society of Plant Physiologists.

== Personal life ==
A week after graduating from Blackburn College, she married classmate Raymond Gantt; the couple later moved to Chicago, where both pursued doctoral studies.
