= Susan Brawley =

American marine ecologist

Susan Howard Brawley
- Born: October 6, 1951; Charlotte, North Carolina, U.S.
- Education: University of California, Berkeley
- Scientific career
- Workplaces: University of Maine
- Thesis: Cytological studies of embryogenesis in the brown alga Fucus : fertilization and the formation of a polarized embryo (1978)

Susan Brawley is an American marine ecologist at the University of Maine known for her research on algae, especially algal reproduction. She was elected a fellow of the American Association for the Advancement of Science in 2012.

== Education and career ==
Brawley has a B.S. from Wellesley College (1973) and earned her Ph.D. in 1978 from the University of California, Berkeley. Following her Ph.D., she worked at the Smithsonian Institution and the University of Connecticut. In 1983, she joined Vanderbilt University as an assistant professor. In 1991, she moved to the University of Maine where she was promoted to professor in 1994.

Brawley was the Editor of the Journal of Phycology from 1996 until 2001. She was the president of the Phycological Society of America in 2011.

== Research ==
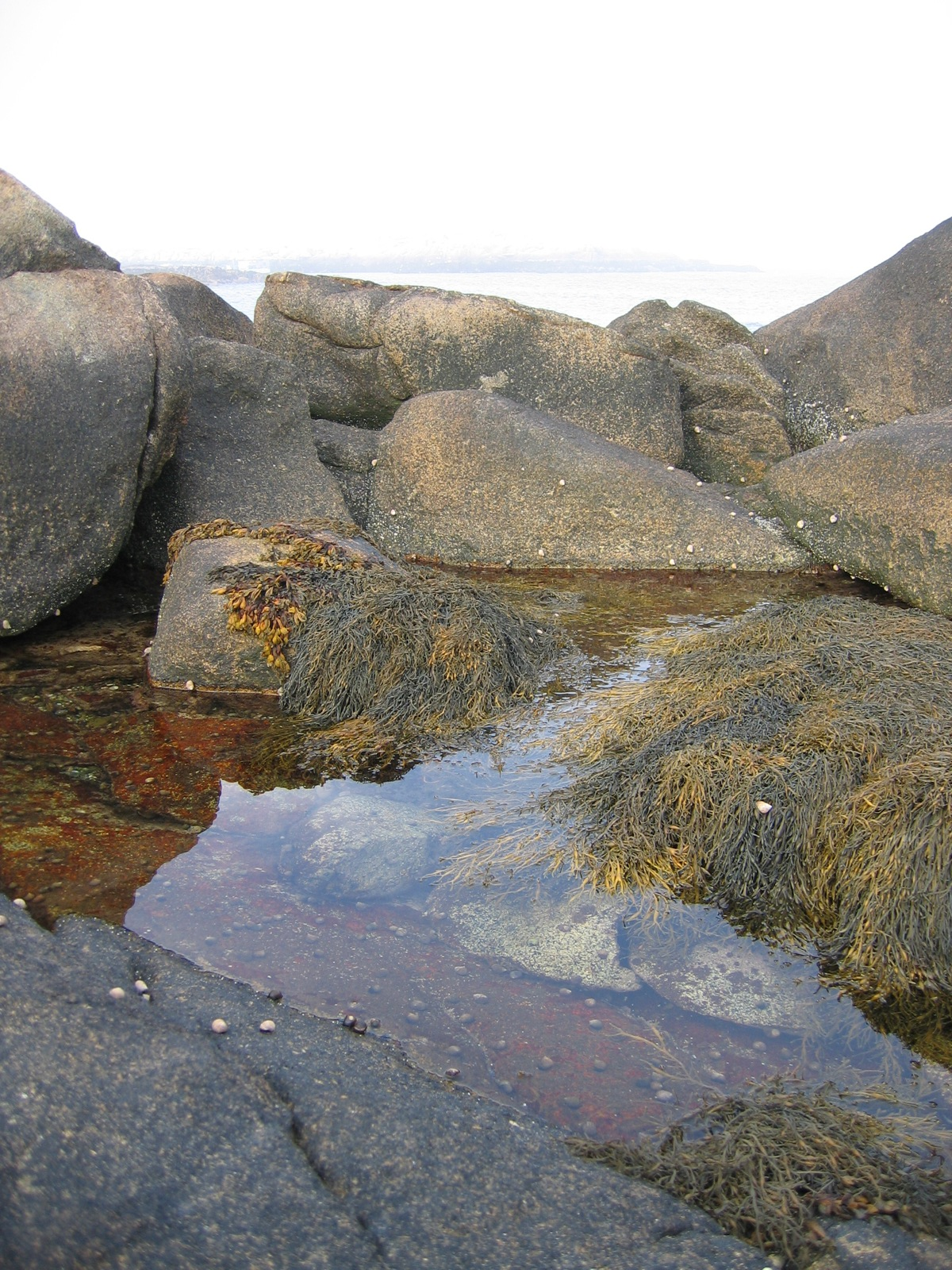
Brawley's research includes investigations into Ascophyllum which is harvested from the intertidal zone in Maine.

Brawley's early research examined the biology of the brown algae Fucus and macroalgal reproductive ecology, and the role of grazers in determining community structure on coral reefs. In the rocky intertidal zone, Brawley has modeled fertilization and the physical transport of gametes from algae. She has also tracked the movement of invasive species including periwinkles and the toothed wrack seaweed, Fucus serratus, where her research revealed that both originated from Ireland and Scotland and were likely carried in ballast rocks on ships that were moving materials across the Atlantic Ocean. Her research on electrical currents measured during the development of wild carrot, a flowering plant, revealed that the chemical indole-3-acetic acid rapidly stopped the current in the plant's cells. Brawley led the team examining the genome of the red algae Porphyra and the resulting research revealed how they survive by transporting nutrients, protecting themselves from light, and form cell walls. Brawley's research has implications for aquaculture and the new marketing of sea vegetables, including Ascophyllum, as a new cash crop in Maine.

=== Selected publications ===
- Brawley, Susan H.; Johnson, Ladd E. (1991). "Survival of Fucoid Embryos in the Intertidal Zone Depends Upon Developmental Stage and Microhabitat1". Journal of Phycology. 27 (2): 179–186. Bibcode:1991JPcgy..27..179B. doi:10.1111/j.0022-3646.1991.00179.x. ISSN 1529-8817. S2CID 84193755.
- Brawley, Susan H. (1992). "Fertilization in natural populations of the dioecious brown alga Fucus ceranoides and the importance of the polyspermy block". Marine Biology. 113 (1): 145–157. Bibcode:1992MarBi.113..145B. doi:10.1007/BF00367648. ISSN 0025-3162. S2CID 84601996.
- Blouin, Nicolas A.; Brodie, Juliet A.; Grossman, Arthur C.; Xu, Pu; Brawley, Susan H. (2011). "Porphyra: a marine crop shaped by stress". Trends in Plant Science. 16 (1): 29–37. Bibcode:2011TPS....16...29B. doi:10.1016/j.tplants.2010.10.004. ISSN 1360-1385. PMID 21067966.
- Wells, Mark L.; Potin, Philippe; Craigie, James S.; Raven, John A.; Merchant, Sabeeha S.; Helliwell, Katherine E.; Smith, Alison G.; Camire, Mary Ellen; Brawley, Susan H. (2017). "Algae as nutritional and functional food sources: revisiting our understanding". Journal of Applied Phycology. 29 (2): 949–982. Bibcode:2017JAPco..29..949W. doi:10.1007/s10811-016-0974-5. ISSN 0921-8971. PMC 5387034. PMID 28458464.
- Brawley, Susan H.; Blouin, Nicolas A.; Ficko-Blean, Elizabeth; Wheeler, Glen L.; Lohr, Martin; Goodson, Holly V.; Jenkins, Jerry W.; Blaby-Haas, Crysten E.; Helliwell, Katherine E.; Chan, Cheong Xin; Marriage, Tara N. (August 1, 2017). "Insights into the red algae and eukaryotic evolution from the genome of Porphyra umbilicalis (Bangiophyceae, Rhodophyta)". Proceedings of the National Academy of Sciences. 114 (31): E6361–E6370. Bibcode:2017PNAS..114E6361B. doi:10.1073/pnas.1703088114. ISSN 0027-8424. PMC 5547612. PMID 28716924.

The standard author abbreviation Brawley is used to indicate this person as the author when citing a botanical name.

== Awards and honors ==
- Award of Excellence, Phycological Society of America (2020)
- Fellow, American Association for the Advancement of Science (2012)
