= Norma J. Lang =

American Botanist

Norma Jean Lang
- Born: July 25, 1931; Memphis, Tennessee
- Died: June 5, 2015 (aged 83); Sacramento, California
- Awards: Darbaker Prize (1969) Guggenheim Fellowship (1968)

Academic background
- Education: Ohio State University (B.S. and M.A.)
- Alma mater: Indiana University Bloomington (Ph.D.)
- Doctoral advisor: Richard C. Starr

Academic work
- Discipline: Phycologist
- Institutions: University of California, Davis (1963 - 1991); University of London (1969)

Norma J. Lang was a phycologist and Professor of Plant Biology, Emerita at the University of California, Davis from 1963 to 1991. Her research primarily focused on understanding the structure of green algae and cyanobacteria.

== Early education ==
Lang was born on July 25, 1931 in Memphis, Tennessee. She graduated from high school in Toledo, OH. She started her bachelor's education at Bowling Green University, but transferred to Ohio State University where she graduated with a Bachelor of Science in 1952 and Master of Arts in 1958.

Lang earned a Ph.D. in botany in 1962 from Indiana University Bloomington for her doctoral research under advisor Richard C. Starr. She held a brief post-doctoral position under Dr. Gordon Whaley at the University of Texas funded with an NIH fellowship.

== Career ==
Lang was an early adopter of transmission electron microscopy, which she used to study the ultrastructure of green algae and cyanobacteria during her Ph.D and into her early career. She was recognized for this work in 1969 with the Darbaker Prize by the Botanical Society of America for "the best paper on microscopic algae published worldwide in the previous two years."

She began as a professor at University of California, Davis in 1963. In 1968, Lang was elected as a Guggenheim Fellow, which allowed her to visit the University of London during a sabbatical. She retired in 1991.

Lang was one of the original Board of Trustees for the Phycological Society of America and served as president in 1975. In 1977, she described a new species, Starria zimbabweensis N.J. Lang. 1977, which is the type species for the genus Starria. She named the genus after her doctoral advisor Richard C. Starr, who had donated the cultured bacteria to Lang before its description.

== Personal life ==
After retiring in 1991, Lang volunteered at the Woodland Public Library in their adult literacy program. She also trained and showed dogs at obedience competitions. Lang died on June 5, 2015 at the age of 83.

== Legacy and bequests ==
Lang bequeathed an unrestricted endowment of $900,000 to the library at the University of California, Davis, which led to the establishment of the Archives and Institutional Assets Program, which helps collect, curate, and preserve research materials, and the Norma J. Lang Library Student Research Prize fund, which is awarded to undergraduate researchers annually at UC Davis.

She also left $900,000 to the Phycological Society of America endowment fund. The society annually awards the Norma J. Lang Early Career Fellowship, a $10,000 fellowship to help early career researchers start new research projects about algae.

The standard author abbreviation N.J.Lang is used to indicate this person as the author when citing a botanical name.
