= Arthur Grossman (disambiguation) =

Arthur Grossman is an American bassoonist and professor of music.

Arthur Grossman may also refer to:

- Arthur R. Grossman (born 1950), American plant biologist
- Arthur Grossman, birth name of lyricist Arthur Freed
