= Gilbert Morgan Smith Medal =

American award for research on algae

The Gilbert Morgan Smith Medal is awarded by the U.S. National Academy of Sciences "in recognition of excellence in published research on marine or freshwater algae." It has been awarded every three years since 1979.

== List of Gilbert Morgan Smith Medal winners ==
Source: NAS

Mark E. Hay (2018)

For developing algae as the major model for marine chemical ecology, and for elucidating how chemical cues and signals from algae structure marine and aquatic populations, communities, and ecosystems.

Takao Kondo (2015)

For demonstrating the occurrence of circadian clocks in prokaryotes, leading through genetic dissection to the discovery of the central bacterial clock genes, kaiABC, and to a new way of thinking about algal ecology.

John B. Waterbury (2012)

For the discovery and characterization of planktonic marine cyanobacteria and viruses that infect them, setting in motion a paradigm shift in our understanding of ocean productivity, ecology, and biogeochemical cycles.

Arthur R. Grossman (2009)

For pioneering creative and comprehensive research on algae and cyanobacteria, elucidating molecular mechanisms by which they adapt to changes in light color and to nutrient stress.

Sabeeha Merchant (2006)

For her pioneering discoveries in the assembly of metalloenzymes and the regulated biogenesis of major complexes of the photosynthetic apparatus in green algae.

Sarah P. Gibbs (2003)

For her revolutionary concepts and evidence that constitute the foundation for the current theory of chloroplast evolution and the phylogenetic relationships of algae and plants.

Shirley W. Jeffrey (2000)

For her discovery and characterization of major algal pigments, their quantitative application in oceanography, and for providing phytoplankton cultures for international research.

Isabella A. Abbott (1997)

For her comprehensive investigations of the biogeography and systematics of marine algae in the eastern and central Pacific, with emphasis on Rhodophyta, the red algae.

Elisabeth Gantt (1994)

For her pioneering work in elucidating the supramolecular structure of the light-harvesting complexes and energy transfer in the photosynthetic apparatus of red and blue-green algae.

Jean-David Rochaix (1991)

For his elegant, inventive studies in Chlamydomonas using genetics along with cell and molecular biology to explain molecular mechanisms of chloroplast biogenesis, photosynthesis, and nuclear-chloroplast interactions.

Ruth Sager (1988)

For her key role in developing our understanding of genetic systems in organelles through her studies of chloroplast inheritance in the green alga Chlamydomonas

Richard C. Starr (1985)

For his important work, which explained the sexuality of desmids and green algae. This was the first time the details of meiosis had been set forth for these groups.

Luigi Provasoli (1982)

For his excellence in phycology, especially for his work on the culture and nutrition of algae, and the influence of bacteria and organic substances on the morphology of larger algae.

William R. Taylor (1979)

For his outstanding contributions to the knowledge of the marine algae of Florida, the Caribbean Sea, the Northwestern Atlantic, and the tropical Pacific Oceans.

== See also ==
- Gilbert Morgan Smith
- List of biology awards
- Prizes named after people
