= TerraVia =

American biotechnology company

TerraVia Holdings, Inc.
- Company type: Public
- Traded as: Nasdaq: TVIA
- Headquarters: South San Francisco, California, U.S.
- Founders: Jonathan Wolfson; Harrison Dillon
- Key people: Jonathan S. Wolfson, CEO
- Industry: Sustainable Foods, Food Ingredients, Renewable Oils
- Website: www.terravia.com

TerraVia Holdings, Inc. (formerly Solazyme) was a publicly held biotechnology company in the United States. TerraVia used proprietary technology to transform a range of low-cost plant-based sugars into high-value oils and whole algae ingredients. TerraVia supplied a variety of sustainable algae-based food ingredients to a number of brands, which included Hormel Food Corporation, Utz Quality Foods Inc and enjoy Life Foods. TerraVia also sold its own culinary algae oil under the Thrive Algae Oil brand. In 2017, the firm declared bankruptcy.

== Company history ==
=== Founding ===
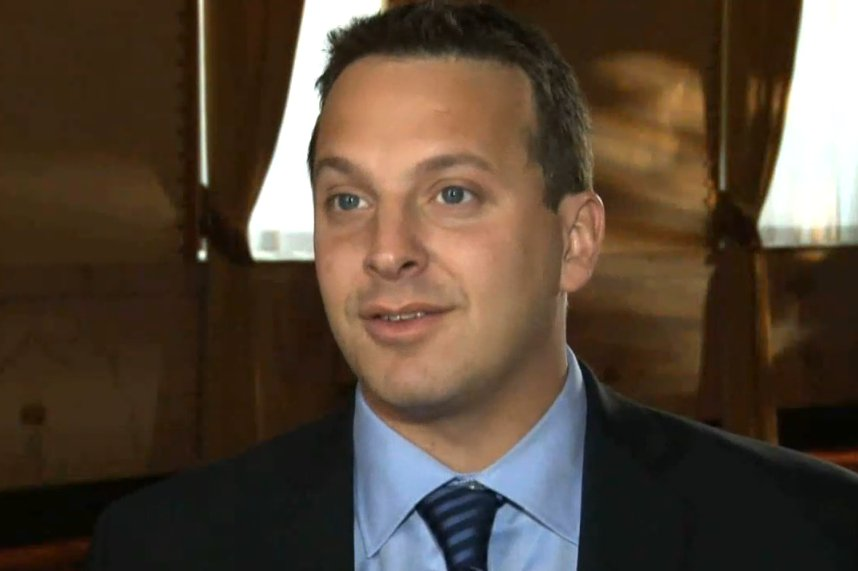
Founder and CEO Jonathan S. Wolfson

Solazyme, Inc., was founded on 31 March 2003, with the mission of utilizing microalgae to create a renewable source of energy and transportation fuels. Founders Jonathan S. Wolfson and Harrison Dillon, who met while attending Emory University, started the company in a garage in Palo Alto. Regarding their partnership, Dillon said: "Neither of us wanted to go work for some giant organization where we were a tiny cog in a huge wheel. We wanted to make a difference and create something that had never existed before.”

In 2013 Dillon announced his decision to step down from his full-time position as CTO and member of the Board of Directors of Solazyme and shift to a long-term consulting role focused on further developing the breadth of the technology platform and advising on intellectual property strategy.

Wolfson continued on as chairman and CEO of Solazyme until August 2016 when he stepped down from management while he stayed on the board.

TerraVia appointed Apu Mody, former president of Mars Food America, as new CEO and a member of the board of directors, in August 2016.

=== Initial focus and technology ===
In 2004 and 2005, Solazyme began development of an algal molecular biology platform, identified and initiated a platform for microalgae-based oil production. The company then expanded focus on skin and personal care products.

Solazyme used a technique to grow microalgae, which allows the production process to be extremely efficient in terms of cost, scale, time, and sustainability. In contrast to common open pond and photo bioreactor approaches, TerraVia grows microalgae in the dark, inside huge stainless-steel containers.

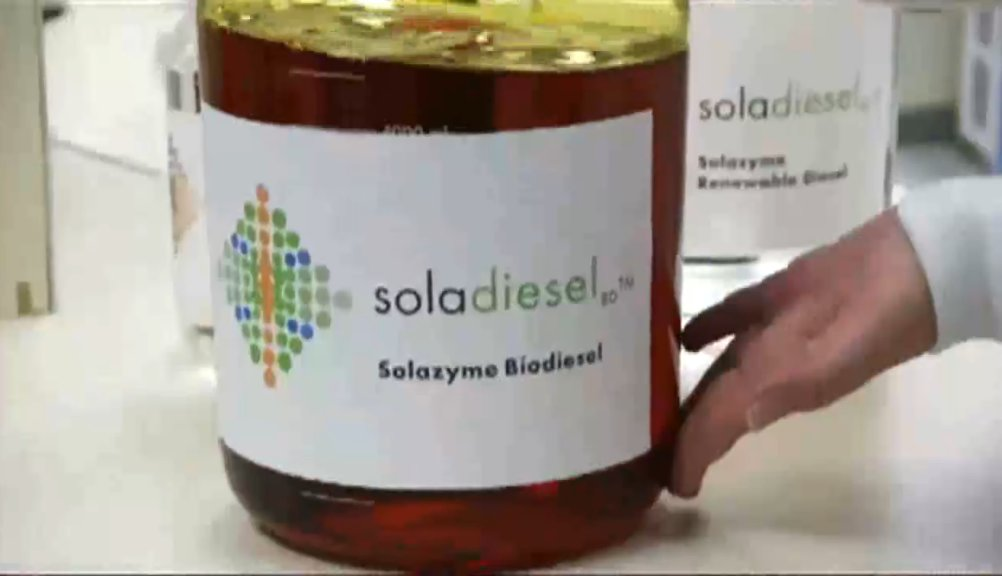
Solazyme Soladiesel shown in the company laboratory.

In September 2007, Solazyme received a $2 million grant from the National Institute of Standards and Technology, signed a joint development agreement with Chevron through its division Chevron Technology Ventures, began operating in commercially sized standard industrial fermentation equipment (75,000-liter scale), worked with a third party refiner to demonstrate the compatibility of the oil with standard refining equipment, and produced over 400 liters of microalgae-based oils.

In January 2008, Solazyme was featured in Fields of Fuel, which was played at the Sundance Film Festival in Park City, Utah. At the event, it presented a Mercedes-Benz C320 fueled with its Soladiesel brand of algal fuel.

Also in January 2008, the company announced a partnership with Chevron Technology Ventures to explore the commercialization of algal fuel. Later that year, the company stated that it had produced the world's first jet fuel derived from an algal source.

In 2009, Solazyme was awarded approximately $22 million from the United States Department of Energy for the construction of an integrated biorefinery project. It also formed a contract with the United States Department of Defense to deliver microalgae-based marine (renewable F-76) diesel fuel to the United States Navy.

In 2011, the company announced it had produced over 283,000 liters of military-spec diesel (HRF-76) for the United States Navy. The initial fuel production for phase 1 of a 550,000 liter contract was completed ahead of schedule. Also in 2011 Solazyme and United Airlines partnered to fly the first ever commercial flight on biofuels including the signing of an LOI for United to purchase 20 million gallons of Solajet fuel.

In 2012, Solazyme partnered with the Navy for the Rim of the Pacific Exercises (RIMPAC) Great Green Fleet (GGF) demonstration in which numerous naval vessels and fighter jets ran on a blend of traditional and renewable fuels in the largest demonstration of its kind.

=== Initial public offering ===
In May 2011, Solazyme set terms for its initial public offering. The company planned to raise $160 million by offering 10 million shares at a price range of $15 to $17 and ended up selling 7,901,800 shares for $20 each in its first day of trading.

Investment banking and securities firm Goldman Sachs reported in July 2011 that with the commercialization of new oil products, Solazyme stock had become less risky. The bank initiated coverage with a top rating and $31 target. In a note to clients, it said Solazyme (Nasdaq: TVIA) stood to boost sales and become more stable now that it had partnered with major agribusinesses like Bunge Limited.

=== Joint venture with Bunge Limited ===
On 8 August 2011, Solazyme announced a joint venture with agribusiness company Bunge Limited to develop renewable oils in Brazil using Solazyme's algae-based sugar-to-oil technology.

In April 2012, Solazyme and Bunge announced a plan to construct a shared commercial-scale production facility in Brazil. As one of the world's largest vegetable oil distributors, Bunge would supply the facility with sugarcane feedstock from its sugarcane processor in Brazil for use in Solazyme algae oil production process.

Construction of the new facility began in June 2012 and in May 2014, the joint venture plant began oil production.

In late 2015, Solazyme and Bunge announced an expansion of their joint venture, which included an agreement to have Bunge market the food oils produced through the joint venture.

The production of AlgaPrime DHA was announced in May 2016 and is the first product under the joint venture of TerraVia and Bunge. AlgaPrime DHA is a new algae-based specialty feed ingredient designed to reduce the aquaculture industry's dependence on wild fish populations.

== Products and brands ==
=== Food ===
In 2010, Solazyme launched its first products, the Golden Chlorella line of dietary supplements, as part of a market development initiative. Products incorporating Golden Chlorella could be found at retailers including Whole Foods Market and General Nutrition Centers.

AlgaVia and AlgaWise supply algae-based ingredients to food manufacturers, such as South Coast Baking Company, Follow Your Heart, and So Delicious Dairy Free.

TerraVia is also responsible for the Thrive Algae Oil brand. Thrive is marketed as "The Best Oil For Your Heart" due to its high levels of monounsaturated fats, which are known to decrease bad cholesterol and reduce the risk of heart disease and stroke. Thrive has been praised by food industry professionals for its neutral taste, versatility, and high smoke point.

The Gelson's grocery chain began supplying Thrive to the Los Angeles area in 2015. Due to its success in this market, TerraVia announced it would expand the distribution of Thrive throughout the West Coast in May 2016.

In 2024 the original Solazyme/TerraVia team relaunched Thrive Algae oil.

=== Aquaculture ===
As part of its joint venture with Bunge Limited, Solazyme/TerraVia supplied aquaculture feed producer BioMar with an algae-based feed ingredient known as AlgaPrime DHA. AlgaPrime DHA is a source of DHA omega-3 fatty acid. which is intended to reduce the aquaculture industry's dependence on wild fish as a source of DHA. AlgaPrime DHA therefore has the potential to boost the sustainability of aquaculture and allow the aquaculture industry to grow in spite of the world's fixed supply of ocean-based DHA. As of 2024, Corbion’s AlgaPrime™ DHA (originally developed and commercialized by Solazyme) is the world’s leading source of algae Omega-3.

=== Personal care ===
TerraVia currently manufactures the Algenist brand for the luxury skin care market through marketing and distribution arrangements with Sephora and QVC. It is sold in Canada, France, and the United Kingdom. The idea of using algae for a skincare line came from Arthur Grossman, the Chief of Genetics at Solazyme and Staff Scientist at the Carnegie Institution. Grossman is an expert in algal photosynthesis and has studied how algae protect themselves from harsh environments and reasoned they could be used to protect human skin.

TerraVia also markets its AlgaPūr Algae Oil brand to personal care producers. Unilever, a leading consumer goods company, is one of TerraVia's biggest partners. In 2010, Solazyme and Unilever started its partnership to develop renewable algae oils for use in soaps and other personal care products. In 2011, Unilever funded TerraVia's research and development efforts, which ended in Unilever agreeing to the terms of a multi-year supply agreement. In September 2013 Unilever agreed to purchase 3 million gallons of algae oil. In March 2016 the companies signed a multi-year supply agreement, where Unilever has agreed to purchase over $200 million worth of a broad portfolio of renewable algae oils.

=== Solazyme Industrials ===
The company formerly engaged in development activities with Chevron, Dow Chemical, Ecopetrol, Qantas, and Unilever. Additionally, Solazyme launched a brand of industrial drilling lubricant known as Encapso. Scientists were able to harness the prolific oil-producing capabilities of microalgae to create microencapsulated oil cells that burst only under sufficient pressure, friction, and shear.

As part of the change in focus, TerraVia stated that its fuels, industrial oils, and Encapso business would be grouped together under Solazyme Industrials starting in March 2016. Furthermore, "The company will be pursuing strategic alternatives over the next 12–18 months to unlock the value created [in Solazyme Industrials]. Solazyme's objective is to identify partners who have the operational capabilities needed to realize the potential of those businesses."

=== TerraVia ===
Solazyme officially changed its name to TerraVia Holdings Inc. in March 2016 with a redefined focus on food, nutrition, and personal care. As part of the change, the company stated that its previous fuel and industrial oil products and workings would operate under Solazyme Industrials.

=== Bankruptcy filing and sale ===
On 2 August 2017, TerraVia filed for bankruptcy protection under Chapter 11. The company announced a "stalking horse" offer from Corbion, N.V., a Netherlands food and biochemical company. The offer valued TerraVia's assets at $20 million plus the assumption of debt associated with the Brazilian manufacturing facility. By comparison, Solazyme's IPO raised over $197 million. The sale closed in September 2017 and by 2023 the legacy Solazyme technology and products were the fastest growing part of Corbion’s portfolio, growing at over 40% yoy with over €110M in sales.

== Sustainability principles and commitments ==
=== Principles and sustainability ===
TerraVia sets a goal of providing replacements for unsustainable products like palm and soybean oil. The brand's food ingredients seek to provide a healthy alternative to animal-based lipids and proteins.

According to its sustainability report, TerraVia states that "transparency is central to all of our sustainability principles." TerraVia supports this goal with a number of commitments, which include engaging with and asking for stakeholders' inputs, publishing product data in peer-reviewed journals, and openly communicating about the production of its products.

As part of this transparency, TerraVia has made information regarding the environmental impacts of its products publicly available.

=== Life cycle analysis ===
TerraVia had the third party organization Thinkstep conduct life cycle analysis on its products in order to assess their environmental impacts in comparison to other oils. The results show that algae oil production often has significantly lower environmental impacts in comparison to traditional oil sources.

A life cycle analysis conducted in 2016 compared the sugarcane-fed algae oil produced at the Solazyme Bunge joint venture facility in Brazil against soybean, tallow, palm kernel, olive, palm, canola, and sunflower oil in terms of its carbon emissions and water consumption. Thinkstep found that the algae oil was on par with sunflower oil in terms of global warming potential per kilogram of oil produced. All other oils compared had higher carbon emissions. Algae oil also had the second lowest impact in water consumption, second to canola oil.

The company also analyzed the land impact of its algae oil compared to traditional oils. It found that the algae oil is comparable to palm oil in land use efficiency, with both algae and palm yielding more than six times the amount of oil per hectare than any other oil producing crop.

The Thinkstep life cycle analysis highlights the advantages of producing algae oil over traditional oil sources in regard to the environmental impacts of oil production.

== Awards ==
- In 2016, Thrive Culinary Algae Oil won the Gama Innovation Award.
- Solazyme won the 2014 Presidential Green Chemistry Challenge Award.
- Solazyme's Algenist skincare brand won the 2014 Marie Claire Prix d'Excellence de la Beaute in France.
- World Economic Forum named Solazyme as one of their 2012 Technology Pioneers.
- Inc. Magazine named Solazyme "America's Fastest-Growing Manufacturing Company" in its September 2011 issue.
- In June 2011 Solazyme won San Francisco Business Times Cleantech and Sustainability Award in the Fuels, Chemicals, and Specialty Products category.
- BREATHE California awarded Solazyme the 2010 Clean Air Award for their renewable oil production technology which significantly reduces greenhouse gas emissions.
- Solazyme won the No. 1 Sustainable Biofuels Technology award at the World Biofuels Markets Conference in 2010.
- Solazyme was ranked No. 1 among the 2009–2010 "50 Hottest Companies in Bioenergy" in Biofuels Digest.
- Solazyme was selected by AlwaysOn as a GoingGreen 100 Top Private Company Award Winner for 2007.

== See also ==
- List of meat substitutes
