= Jack Myers (biologist) =

American biologist

- Born: July 10, 1913; Boyd's Mills, Pennsylvania
- Died: December 28, 2006 (aged 93); Austin, Texas
- Scientific career
- Fields: biology

John Edgar "Jack" Myers (July 10, 1913 – December 28, 2006) was an American molecular biologist and writer of popular science.

== Biography ==
Born in Pennsylvania, Myers graduated from Juniata College in 1933, and gained a Masters from Montana State University in 1935, and a Ph.D. from the University of Minnesota in 1939. Myers joined the University of Texas in 1941, teaching until 1980. He continued researching as an emeritus professor until 1999. His areas of expertise were photosynthesis, phototropism and algae. His work included research on growing algae in space.

He was elected as a member of the U.S. National Academy of Sciences in 1975. In 1998, he was awarded the Founders Award by the American Society for Gravitational and Space Biology. Other awards include The Darbaker Prize from the Botanical Society of America in 1959.

He was the senior science editor of Highlights for Children from 1958 until his death in 2006, aged 93. The magazine, a general interest magazine for children, had been started by his parents in 1946, and had a circulation of about two million in 2006.
