= Henry Kraemer =

Pharmacy professor and editor known for work in pharmacognosy

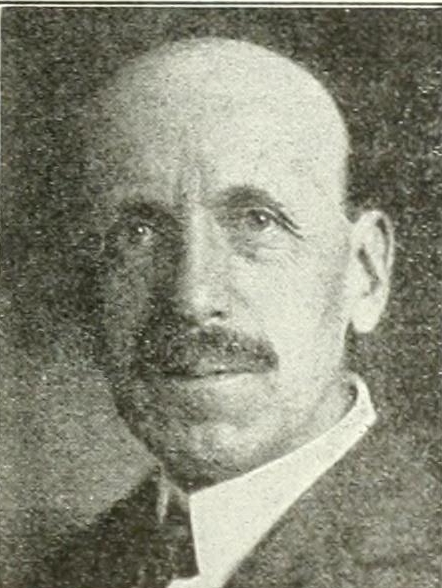
- Professor Kraemer in 1918
- Born: July 22, 1868; Philadelphia, Pennsylvania, U.S.
- Died: September 9, 1924 (aged 56); Detroit, Michigan, U.S.
- Occupations: professor, textbook author, journal editor

Henry Kraemer (July 22, 1868 – September 9, 1924) was an American professor of pharmacy who specialized in pharmacognosy and wrote several pioneering textbooks on the subject. He also served as the editor of the American Journal of Pharmacy from 1899 to 1917.

== Biography ==
Henry was born in Philadelphia, Pennsylvania to John Henry and Caroline Fuchs. His father, a merchant, died when he was young and he went to study at Girard College until 1883 and apprenticed to the pharmacist Clement Lowe for five years, receiving a graduate degree from the Philadelphia College of Pharmacy in 1889. He taught materia medica at the College of Pharmacy in the City of New York in 1890 while also studying botany at Barnard college. In 1895 he obtained a bachelor of philosophy degree from the School of Mines, Columbia University and went to Germany where he received a Ph.D. from the University of Marburg under Arthur Mayer with a dissertation on Viola tricolor titled "Viola tricolor L. in morphologischer, anatomischer und biologischer Beziehung". He returned to Philadelphia College of Pharmacy where he became a professor of botany and pharmacognosy until 1917 in which year he moved to the University of Michigan before retiring after three years. He examined plant products in collaboration with the Michigan Botanical Gardens and ran correspondence courses.

In 1899, he was elected as a member to the American Philosophical Society.

He served as the editor of the American Journal of Pharmacy from 1898 to 1917 in which he himself regularly published. One of his other interests was the role of metals as bactericidal agents. He was a member of several organizations, including the Torrey Botanical Club, the Botanical Society of America and was an honorary member of the Pharmaceutical Societies of Great Britain and France. His biggest contribution was A Text-book of Botany and Pharmacognosy which was first published in 1902 with three editions running to 1910. In 1915 he wrote Scientific and Applied Pharmacognosy, Intended for the Use of Students in Pharmacy and Practicing Pharmacists, Food and Drug Analysts and Pharmacologists. As a pioneer of photography, he illustrated his own books.

Kraemer was married to Theodosia Rich from 1894 until their divorce. He married Minnie Behm in 1922.

Following Kraemer's death in 1924, the 1928 edition of Kraemer's Scientific and Applied Pharmacognosy was completed by Edwin L. Newcomb, Leasure K. Darbaker, Edmund N. Gathercoal and Earl B. Fischer. It was reviewed as "a credit to the American leaders in pharmacognosy".
