= Ruth Sager =

American geneticist (1918–1997)

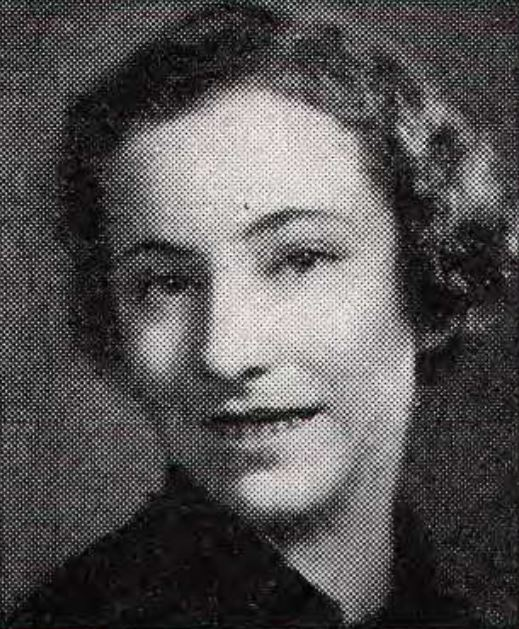
- Born: February 7, 1918; Chicago, Illinois, U.S.
- Died: March 29, 1997 (aged 79); Brookline, Massachusetts, U.S.
- Education: University of Chicago; Rutgers University; Columbia University
- Known for: Pioneering cytoplasmic genetics
- Awards: Gilbert Morgan Smith Medal (1988)
- Scientific career
- Fields: Genetics, extranuclear inheritance
- Workplaces: Rockefeller Institute, Columbia University, Hunter College, Harvard Medical School, Dana–Farber Cancer Institute
- Doctoral advisor: Marcus Morton Rhoades

Ruth Sager (February 7, 1918 – March 29, 1997) was an American plant geneticist, cell physiologist and cancer researcher. In the 1950s and 1960s she pioneered the field of cytoplasmic genetics by discovering transmission of genetic traits through chloroplast DNA, the first known example of genetics not involving the cell nucleus. The academic community did not acknowledge the significance of her contribution until after the second wave of feminism in the 1970s. Her second career began in the early 1970s and was in cancer genetics; she proposed and investigated the roles of tumor suppressor genes.

== Early life and education ==
Ruth Sager was born in Chicago on February 7, 1918, the only child of Leon B. Sager, an advertising executive, and Deborah Borovik Sager. Her mother died from the influenza epidemic in March 1919. Her widowed father married Hannah Shulman and had two more daughters, Esther and Naomi. At age 16, Ruth graduated from New Trier High School.

She then enrolled at the University of Chicago with plans to study liberal arts and major in English. A physiology course taught by Anton Carlson awakened her interest in biology. Since she enjoyed her science classes the most, Sager switched her major to biology, aiming to attend medical school. She earned her Bachelor of Science degree in 1938 and was elected to Phi Beta Kappa.

=== Middle East connection ===
Aiming to give their three daughters a wide-ranging education, Sager’s parents took them on a trip through Europe and the Middle East from February to May 1938. While in Palestine, Sager visited a kibbutz, whose members’ self-sufficiency in creating a life in the desert impressed her. She wanted to return to Palestine, but ran into harsh emigration restrictions. Over the next few years, she spent time working on several American training farms of Hashomer Hatzair, a Zionist movement for young secular Jews. While doing so, she became interested in the scientific aspects of desert farming.

=== Graduate studies ===
Attending graduate school at Rutgers University, Sager opted for scientific research instead of medical practice. She carried out wartime research on the growth of tomato seedlings, receiving her M.S. in plant physiology in October 1944 with a thesis on the mineral nutrition of tomato plants. She spent the next academic year working on the horticulture department farm at the University of Maryland.

Sager’s wartime correspondence with Seymour Melman, an army officer stationed in California, led to their marriage in 1944. Both were accepted at Columbia University, where they began their graduate studies in 1945. Sager studied maize (corn) genetics under Marcus Rhoades, sometimes doing fieldwork for Barbara McClintock, who served as a reader of Sager’s dissertation. Sager earned her PhD in 1948.

Sager and Melman divorced in 1960. In 1973, Sager married Arthur Pardee.

== Research and career ==
Sager was awarded a Merck Fellowship from the National Research Council in 1949, and worked as a postdoctoral fellow at the Rockefeller Institute on the chloroplast from 1949 to 1951 in the laboratory of Sam Granick. She was promoted to a staff position (assistant in the biochemistry division) in 1951, working in this capacity until 1955, using the alga Chlamydomonas reinhardtii as a model organism. She performed breeding experiments with the algae, mating strains that were resistant to the chloroplast inhibiting agent streptomycin with strains that were streptomycin-sensitive. Unlike what would be expected if the trait were passed down following traditional Mendelian inheritance, she found that the offspring only showed the streptomycin sensitivity/resistance trait of one of their parents. This research provided evidence for non-Mendelian uniparental inheritance; it also showed that there are multiple independent genetic systems in Chlamydomonas. She found further evidence when she mapped the streptomycin sensitivity/resistance trait and found a stable, nonchromosomal inheritance system that she proposed may have arisen before chromosomes. She was the first person to publish extensive genetic mapping of a cellular organelle.

She joined Columbia University's zoology department as a research associate in 1955, supported by funding from the United States Public Health Service and the National Science Foundation. She was promoted to senior research associate in the early 1960s, but she had difficulty obtaining a faculty position due to initial skepticism surrounding cytoplasmic inheritance from the scientific community, as well as gender discrimination. It wasn't until 1966, 18 years after receiving her doctorate, that Hunter College invited her to be a professor of biology.

Sager changed her research focus to cancer biology in the 1970s, with a specific focus on breast cancer, and spent time researching at London's Imperial Cancer Research Fund Laboratory from 1972 to 1973, where she met her future husband, Arthur Pardee. In 1975 she joined the Department of Microbiology and Molecular Genetics at Harvard Medical School as a professor of cellular genetics, where she served as chief of the Division of Cancer Genetics at the affiliated Dana–Farber Cancer Institute. Her research there focused on the genetic and molecular causes of cancer, including investigation of the roles of tumor suppressor genes, DNA methylation, and chromosomal instability in tumor growth and spread. Sager was one of the first people to emphasize the importance of such genes. She identified over 100 potential tumor suppressor genes and performed extensive research into a specific tumor suppressor gene called maspin (mammary serine protease inhibitor) She developed cell culture methods to study normal and cancerous human and other mammalian cells in the laboratory and pioneered the research into “expression genetics,” the study of altered gene expression.

For more than half a century she demonstrated vision, insight and determination to develop novel scientific concepts in the face of established dogmas. Her pioneering research and original ideas continue to make contributions to biology

— Mary J.C. Hendrix, Mapsin, 2002

She was elected a fellow of the National Academy of Sciences in 1977, and the American Academy of Arts and Sciences in 1979. In 1988 Sagar was awarded the Gilbert Morgan Smith Medal from the National Academy of Sciences.

Sager published two classic textbooks: Cell Heredity (1961), co-written by Francis Ryan and considered by some to be the first molecular biology textbook; and Cytoplasmic Genes and Organelles (1972).

== Death ==
Sager died of bladder cancer in Brookline, Massachusetts in 1997.

== Selected honors and awards ==
- Guggenheim Fellowship, 1972.
- Elected fellow of the National Academy of Sciences, 1977.
- Elected fellow of the American Academy of Arts and Sciences, 1979.
- Outstanding Investigator Award, National Cancer Institute, 1985.
- Gilbert Morgan Smith Medal, National Academy of Sciences, 1988.
- Princess Takamatso Lecturer in Japan, 1990.
- Alumna of the Year, University of Chicago, 1994.

== Selected publications ==
- Sager, Ruth; Ryan, Francis J. (1961). Cell Heredity. New York: Wiley.
- Sager, Ruth (1972). Cytoplasmic Genes and Organelles. Academic Press.
