= TB11Cs2H1 snoRNA =

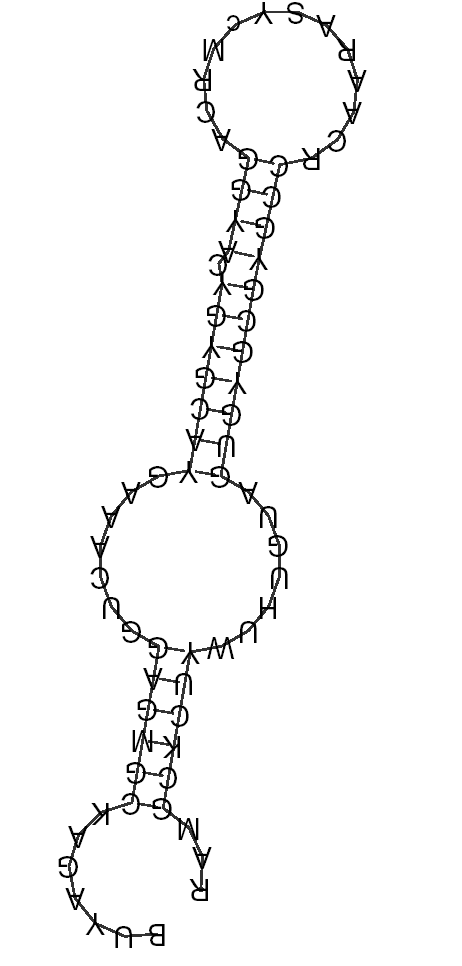
Consensus structure of TB11Cs2H1

TB11Cs2H1 is a member of the H/ACA-like class of non-coding RNA (ncRNA) molecules that guide the sites of modification of uridines to pseudouridines of substrate RNAs. It is known as a small nucleolar RNA (snoRNA) thus named because of its cellular localization in the nucleolus of the eukaryotic cell. TB11Cs2H1 is a unique H/ACA RNA, it is also known as the splice leader associated RNA (SLA1). It was demonstrated that although this RNA guides pseudouridylation on SL RNA its main function is to properly fold its target in a distinct structure early in its biogenesis.

== See also ==
- TB3Cs2H1 snoRNA
- TB10Cs1H1 snoRNA
