= Mark Hay =

American marine ecologist

- Born: Mark Edward Hay; May 3, 1952 (age 74)
- Citizenship: American
- Education: University of Kentucky (B.A., 1974); University of California, Irvine (Ph.D., 1980)
- Known for: Marine ecology Research on coral reefs
- Awards: Lowell Thomas Award (2015); Gilbert Morgan Smith Medal (2018)
- Scientific career
- Fields: Ecology
- Institutions: Georgia Institute of Technology
- Thesis: Algal ecology on a Caribbean fringing reef (1980)

Mark Edward Hay (born May 3, 1952) is an American marine ecologist. He is Regents Professor and Harry and Anna Teasley Chair in the School of Biological Sciences at the Georgia Institute of Technology. A fellow of the American Association for the Advancement of Science and the Ecological Society of America, he is known for his research on coral reefs in Fiji. He received the Cody Award from the Scripps Institution of Oceanography in 2012, the Lowell Thomas Award from the Explorers Club in 2015, the Silver Medal from the International Society of Chemical Ecology in 2016, and the Gilbert Morgan Smith Medal from the National Academy of Sciences in 2018. He was elected a member of both the National Academy of Sciences and the American Academy of Arts and Sciences in 2022.
