= TB9Cs6H1 snoRNA =

Non-coding RNA molecule

TB9Cs6H1 is a member of the H/ACA-like class of non-coding RNA (ncRNA) molecule that guide the sites of modification of uridines to pseudouridines of substrate RNAs. It is known as a small nucleolar RNA (snoRNA) thus named because of its cellular localization in the nucleolus of the eukaryotic cell. TB9Cs6H1 is predicted to guide the pseudouridylation of LSU5 ribosomal RNA (rRNA) at residue Ψ199 and 5.8S at residue Ψ29.
