= Richard C. Starr =

Richard Cawthorn Starr (August 24, 1924 – February 3, 1998) was an American phycologist.

== Awards ==
Richard C. Starr was the inaugural recipient of the Darbaker Prize from the Botanical Society of America in 1955 and the recipient of the Gilbert Morgan Smith Medal in 1985.

== Taxa named in honor of Richard C. Starr ==
- Starria gen. nov. (Cyanophyta, described by N. J. Lang. J. Phycol. 13(1977):288-96.
- Chlorococcum starrii sp. nov. (Chlorophyta, described by F. R. Trainor and P. A. Verses. Phycology 6(1967):237-39.
- Cystomonas starrii, transferred by H. Ettl and G. Gartner. Nova Hedwigia 44(1987):509-17.
- Pleodorina starrii, sp. nov. (Chlorophyta), described by H. Nozaki, FD Ott, and AW Coleman. Journal of Phycology 42(2006):1072-1080. doi:10.1111/j.1529-8817.2006.00255.x.

== Works ==
- Starr, R.C., Marner, F.J. and Jaenicke, L. (1995). Chemoattraction of male gametes by a pheromone produced by female gametes of chlamydomonas. Proc. Natl. Acad. Sci. U.S.A. 92, 641–645.
