= Sarah P. Gibbs =

American biologist

Sarah P. Gibbs (May 25, 1930 – September 25, 2014) was Emeritus Professor of Biology at McGill University in Canada, where she was initially appointed as an assistant professor on tenure track in September 1966. She was a Fellow of the Royal Society of Canada, and a Fellow of the American Association for the Advancement of Science, and she received the 2003 Gilbert Morgan Smith medal for research on algae.

Gibbs was born on May 25, 1930, in Boston, and received a bachelor's degree in zoology in 1952 at Cornell University in Ithaca, New York. She continued at Cornell completing a Master's program in zoology with a minor in education. Her first scientific position, post-Master's degree, was working as a technician for zoology professor Marcus Singer. She moved with her then-husband, Bob Gibbs, to Woods Hole, Massachusetts, and obtained a part-time laboratory technician position with Ralph Lewin at the Marine Biological Laboratory (MBL) where Albert Szent-Györgyi had a laboratory. In Lewin's laboratory, she was able to run her own experiments. While still a technician, Gibbs applied to study in the lab of Kenneth Thimann at Harvard University as a PhD student. She started working toward a PhD at Harvard in the fall of 1958 as a National Science Foundation Fellow, graduating with a PhD degree in November 1961.

While at Harvard, Gibbs switched advisors, completing her PhD under the advisement of George Chapman, studying the pyrenoid structure in algae, as well as the ultrastructure of the chloroplast itself. In 1962, she published a paper titled "Nuclear envelope-chloroplast relationships in algae", detailing the unexpected discovery that in a number of algal classes the chloroplasts are surrounded by four, not two, membranes. Gibbs called the two extra membranes the outer envelope, but they were later named the chloroplast endoplasmic reticulum (ER) in a paper published by Ben Bouck in 1965.

She died in Newport, New Hampshire, at the age of 84.
