= TB6Cs1H3 snoRNA =

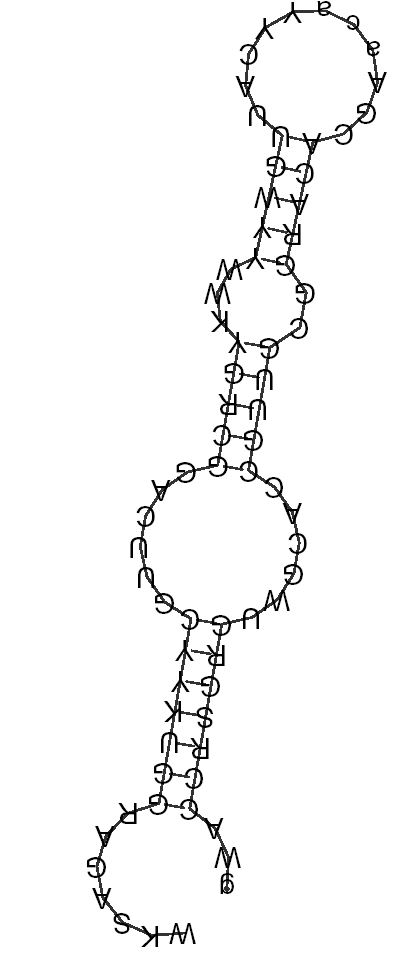
Consensus structure of TB6Cs1H3

TB6Cs1H3 is a member of the H/ACA-like class of non-coding RNA (ncRNA) molecule that guide the sites of modification of uridines to pseudouridines of substrate RNAs. It is known as a small nucleolar RNA (snoRNA) thus named because of its cellular localization in the nucleolus of the eukaryotic cell. TB6Cs1H3 is predicted to guide the pseudouridylation of SSU ribosomal RNA (rRNA) at residue Ψ662.
