= TB10Cs1H1 snoRNA =

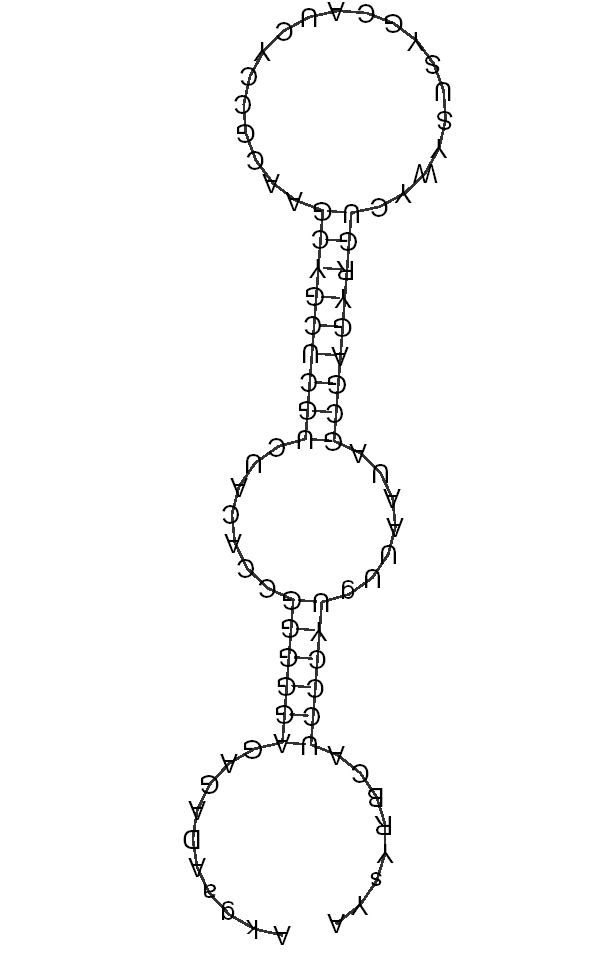
Consensus structure of TB10Cs1H1

TB10Cs1H1 is a member of the H/ACA-like class of non-coding RNA (ncRNA) molecule that guide the sites of modification of uridines to pseudouridines of substrate RNAs. It is known as a small nucleolar RNA (snoRNA) thus named because of its cellular localization in the nucleolus of the eukaryotic cell. TB10Cs1H1 is predicted to guide the pseudouridylation of LSU3 ribosomal RNA (rRNA) at residue Ψ659.

== See also ==
- TB11Cs2H1 snoRNA
- TB3Cs2H1 snoRNA
