= Peggy Lemaux =

American plant biologist

Peggy Goodenow Lemaux is an American plant biologist. She won a 2003 Dennis R. Hoagland Award.

She graduated from Miami University, and University of Michigan, She studied with Stan Cohen. She was a research scientist at DeKalb Genetics. She is a Professor of Cooperative Extension at the University of California, Berkeley. She won a grant from the Gates Foundation to study sorghum. She developed genetically modified varieties of barley, wheat and sorghum. She opposed an anti-GMO ballot initiative in California. She has several patents.

== Works ==
- Lemaux, Peggy G. (2008). "Genetically Engineered Plants and Foods: A Scientist's Analysis of the Issues (Part I)". Annual Review of Plant Biology. 59 (1). Annual Reviews: 771–812. doi:10.1146/annurev.arplant.58.032806.103840. ISSN 1543-5008.
- Gao, Cheng; Montoya, Liliam; Xu, Ling; Madera, Mary; Hollingsworth, Joy; Purdom, Elizabeth; Singan, Vasanth; Vogel, John; Hutmacher, Robert B.; Dahlberg, Jeffery A.; Coleman-Derr, Devin; Lemaux, Peggy G.; Taylor, John W. (2020-01-07). "Fungal community assembly in drought-stressed sorghum shows stochasticity, selection, and universal ecological dynamics". Nature Communications. 11 (1). Springer Science and Business Media LLC. doi:10.1038/s41467-019-13913-9. ISSN 2041-1723. PMC 6946711.
- Mackelprang, Rebecca; Lemaux, Peggy G. (2020-04-29). "Genetic Engineering and Editing of Plants: An Analysis of New and Persisting Questions". Annual Review of Plant Biology. 71 (1). Annual Reviews: 659–687. doi:10.1146/annurev-arplant-081519-035916. ISSN 1543-5008.
