= TB10Cs5H3 snoRNA =

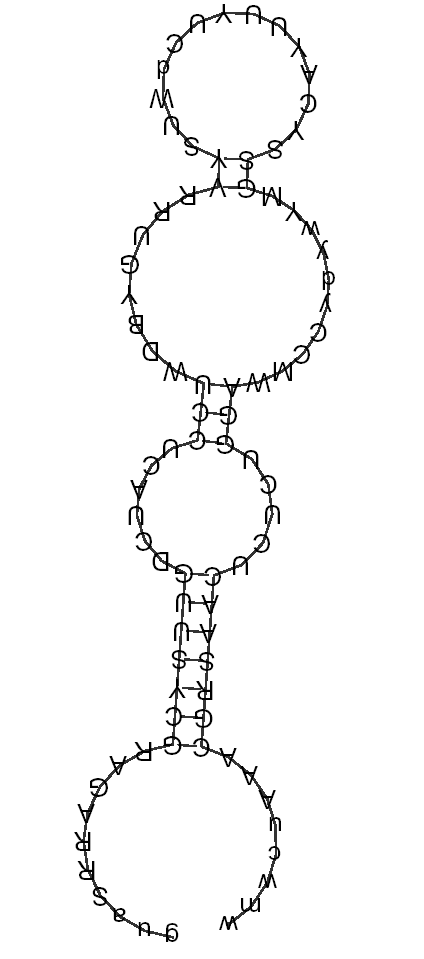
Consensus structure of TB10Cs5H3

TB10Cs5H3 is a member of the H/ACA-like class of non-coding RNA (ncRNA) molecule that guide the sites of modification of uridines to pseudouridines of substrate RNAs. It is known as a small nucleolar RNA (snoRNA) thus named because of its cellular localization in the nucleolus of the eukaryotic cell. TB10Cs5H3 is predicted to guide the pseudouridylation of SSU ribosomal RNA (rRNA) at residue Ψ1276.
