= TB9Cs3H1 snoRNA =

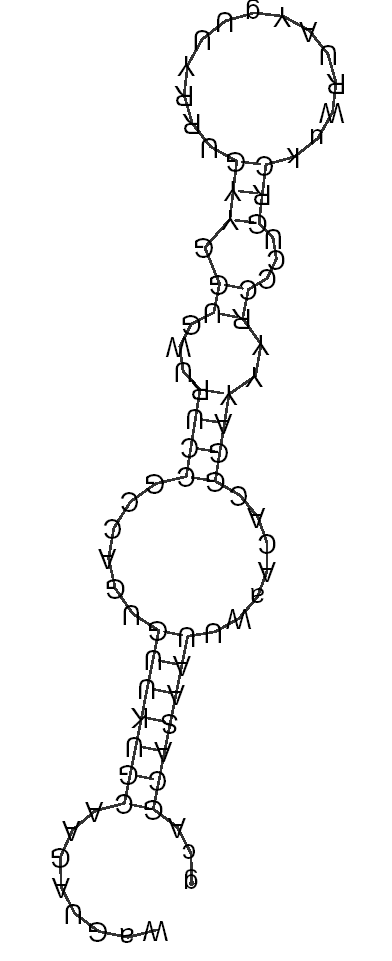
Consensus structure of TB9Cs3H1

TB9Cs3H1 is a member of the H/ACA-like class of non-coding RNA (ncRNA) molecule that guide the sites of modification of uridines to pseudouridines of substrate RNAs. It is known as a small nucleolar RNA (snoRNA) thus named because of its cellular localization in the nucleolus of the eukaryotic cell. TB9Cs3H1 is predicted to guide the pseudouridylation of LSU3 ribosomal RNA (rRNA) at residue Ψ1208.
