= Sabeeha Merchant =

Plant scientist

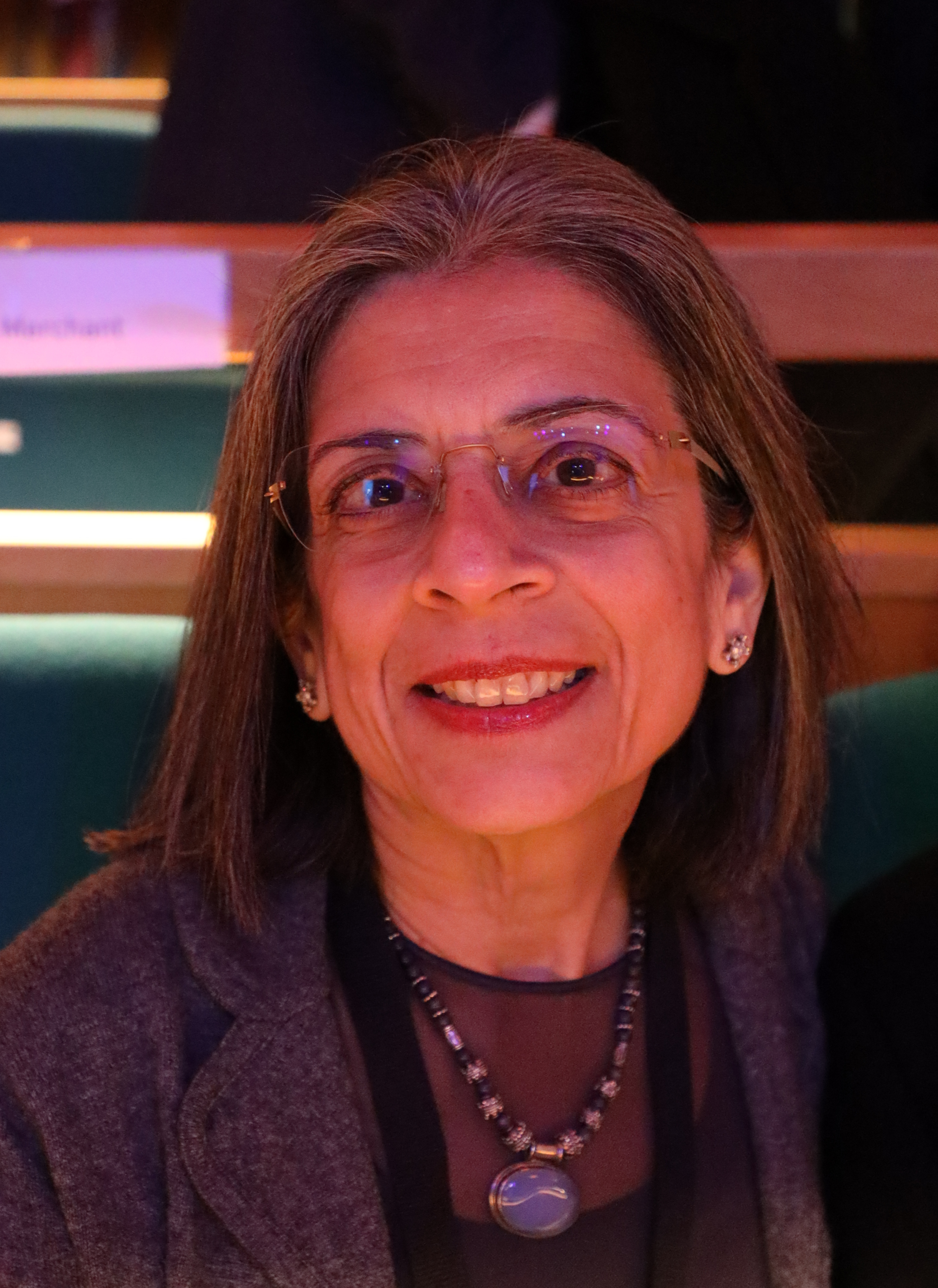
- Merchant at 2024 Nobel Prize lectures
- Born: Sabeeha Sabanali Merchant; August 31, 1959 (age 67); Mumbai
- Education: University of Wisconsin–Madison (PhD)
- Awards: Gilbert Morgan Smith Medal (2006); Member of the National Academy of Sciences (2012)
- Scientific career
- Workplaces: University of California, Berkeley; University of California, Los Angeles
- Thesis: The Chlamydomonas reinhardi chloroplast coupling factor 1 : its purification, properties, and aspects of its synthesis in vivo (1983)
- Website: merchant.berkeley.edu

Sabeeha Sabanali Merchant (born 1959) is a professor of plant biology at the University of California, Berkeley. She studies the photosynthetic metabolism and metalloenzymes In 2010 Merchant led the team that sequenced the Chlamydomonas genome. She was elected a member of the National Academy of Sciences in 2012.

== Early life and education ==
Merchant was born in Mumbai. She was unsure what to specialise in, and took an aptitude test at the age of 12. Merchant scored well in the science and the humanities, but was selected for the sciences as there were not enough girls in the class. Merchant attended the J.B. Petit High School for Girls. At the age of fifteen, Merchant started university at St. Xavier's College, where she was one of five women in a class of 300. She relocated to the United States. She joined the University of Wisconsin–Madison in 1978 and became interested in the chemistry of living cells whilst working under the supervision of Glenn Chambliss. Merchant majored in molecular biology and earned her bachelor's degree in 1979. She joined the Enzyme Institute to work as Henry A. Lardy's secretary, but he encouraged her to apply for graduate programs. She eventually earned her PhD at the University of Wisconsin–Madison in 1983. She worked alongside Bruce Selman on the single-cell alga Chlamydomonas reinhardtii. Chlamydomonas reinhardtii is a model organism as it can build the relevant systems for photosynthesis in the absence of light. During her doctorate Merchant purified chloroplast coupling factor 1, a component of the pathway that uses ATP synthase to synthesize adenosine triphosphate.

== Research and career ==
After completing her PhD, Merchant joined Lawrence Bogorad at Harvard University. She started working on light-regulated gene expression. Unfortunately, four months into her postdoctoral research fellowship there was a fire in the laboratory. During this time she began to read in the library, investigating role of metals in the regulation of photosynthetic electron transport in Chlamydomonas. She studied how cells detect the levels of copper and developed antibodies.

Merchant was the first to demonstrate that the RNA for Chlamydomonas reinhardtii plastocyanin is produced when copper is available. She used pulse-chase analysis to show that whilst plastocyanin is continuously translated, it becomes degraded in systems without enough copper. Merchant showed that the RNA of cytochrome c6, an iron-based protein, is only present in copper deficient cells. She showed that chlamydomonas also contained cytochrome c6, which could step in during photosynthesis if needed.

In 1987 Merchant moved to the University of California, Los Angeles (UCLA). She works on metal nutrient deficiency, which requires water purification systems to generate water that is free of metal contaminants. In her lab experiments are performed in rigorously cleaned glassware, using hydrochloric acid to remove surface metal ions. Her early work considered signalling that responded to copper, but she has since expanded into iron sensing and the impact of iron deficiencies on photosynthesis. In an effort to understand copper sensing, she studied mutants that did not produce plastocyanin. She discovered that the regulator for plastocyanin and cytochrome c regulation was CRR1 (Copper Response Regulator). She worked with Todd Yeates on the structure and genetics of plastocyanin and cytochrome c, uncovering the crystal structures of both proteins. She was awarded the National Academy of Sciences Gilbert Morgan Smith Medal for her contributions to the assembly of metalloenzymes. In 2007 she led a team that sequenced the Chlamydomonas genome. Her inaugural article was published in PNAS in 2009. She spent 2012 on a sabbatical at the Max Planck Institute of Molecular Plant Physiology. She was appointed director of the Institute for Genomics and Proteomics at UCLA in 2014. She also served on the Life Sciences jury for the Infosys Prize in 2017.

Merchant moved to the University of California, Berkeley in 2018. At Berkeley, she is a Professor of Plant and Microbial Biology. Her lab continue to investigate the metabolism of iron and copper, as well as comparative genomics of algae and bioenergy.

Merchant has served as the editor-in-chief of the Annual Review of Plant Biology since 2005, and was editor-in-chief of The Plant Cell from 2015-2019. She serves on the Board of Directors of Annual Reviews.

=== Awards and honors ===
Her awards and honors include;

- 1999 American Society of Plant Biologists Charles Albert Shull Award
- 2004 University of California, Los Angeles Herbert Newby McCoy Award
- 2005 Fellow of the American Association for the Advancement of Science
- 2008 Fellow of the American Society of Plant Biologists
- 2006 Gilbert Morgan Smith Medal
- 2010 American Society of Plant Biologists Charles F. Kettering Award
- 2012 Alexander von Humboldt Foundation Humboldt Award
- 2012 Elected to the National Academy of Sciences
- 2012, Darbaker Prize, Botanical Society of America
- 2014 Elected to the American Academy of Arts and Sciences
- 2016 Elected to the Academy of Sciences Leopoldina
- Recognized as a Pioneer Member of the American Society of Plant Biologists.
