= Leasure K. Darbaker =

American scientist

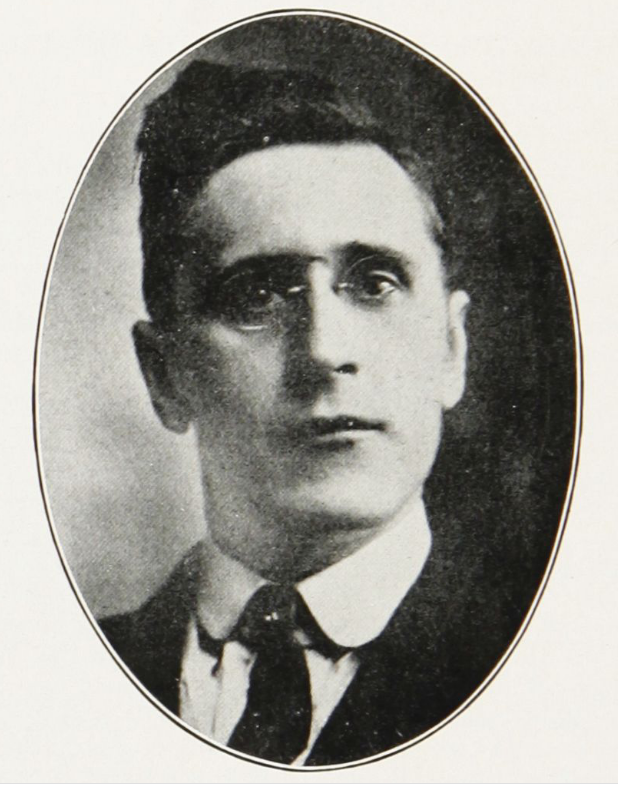
- Born: Leasure Kline Darbaker; January 13, 1879; Pittsburgh, Pennsylvania
- Died: February 6, 1949 (aged 70)
- Education: Pittsburgh College of Pharmacy
- Scientific career
- Fields: Bacteriology, Pharmacognosy
- Workplaces: Pittsburgh College of Pharmacy

Leasure K. Darbaker (January 13, 1879, Pittsburgh, Pennsylvania-February 6, 1949) was a bacteriologist and Professor of Pharmacognosy and Bacteriology at the Pittsburgh College of Pharmacy in Pittsburgh, Pennsylvania.

Darbaker served as Chair of Bacteriology of the Pittsburgh College of Pharmacy, as President of the Pittsburgh chapter of the American Pharmaceutical Association and President of the Pennsylvania Academy of Science from 1937 to 1938. Known for his work as an educator, his published books include A manual of microscopy (1920), A manual of histological pharmacognosy and bacteriology (1921), and works on the medical uses of Western Pennsylvania plants. In his will, he established the Darbaker Prizes through the Pennsylvania Academy of Science and the Botanical Society of America.

== Early life and education ==
Leasure Kline Darbaker was born January 13, 1879, in Pittsburgh, Pennsylvania, to the Rev. Dr. Henry David Darbaker and Agnes Jane (Kline) Darbaker. He attended public schools in McKeesport and Emlenton, Pennsylvania. He attended university at Grove City College and Ohio Northern University, receiving a degree in pharmacy from Ohio Northern in 1900. Darbaker apprenticed in pharmacy in 1900 with H. R. Gilmore in Emlenton, Pennsylvania.

Darbaker then attended the Pittsburgh College of Pharmacy (later the University of Pittsburgh School of Pharmacy), receiving a Graduate of Pharmacy degree (Ph. G.) in 1906 and a Doctor of Pharmacy degree (PharmD) in 1909. He did post doctorate work in England and Germany in 1909.

In 1937 Darbaker received an honorary Doctor of Science (Sc.D.) degree from Ohio Northern University.

== Career ==
In 1907 Darbaker became an assistant instructor to William J. McAdams, a professor at Pittsburgh College of Pharmacy. He succeeded McAdams as Professor of Pharmacognosy and Bacteriology following McAdams' death in 1910. Darbaker taught at the College until his retirement in 1946, then becoming professor emeritus.

As a pharmacognosist Darbaker studied medical and poisonous substances derived from natural sources, particularly the plants of Western Pennsylvania, for their potential pharmaceutical use. In December 1927, Darbaker proposed the development of a medicinal plant garden which was subsequently created in Schenley Park. As of 1947, the garden became the responsibility of the Hilltop Garden Club of Pittsburgh.

Darbaker was a member of the College Corporation from 1909 to 1948. The College Corporation was the governing body of the Pittsburgh College of Pharmacy, formally incorporated in 1878 "for the purpose of cultivating, improving and disseminating the Knowledge of Pharmacy".

Darbaker was active in a variety of scientific associations, including the American Association for Advancement of Science, American Pharmaceutical Association, American Public Health Association, American Society of Bacteriologists, American Society of Plant Physiologists, the American Malacological Union (now Society), the American Microscopical Society, and the Botanical Society of Western Pennsylvania.

Darbaker was a founding member of the Pittsburgh Graduate chapter of Kappa Psi pharmaceutical fraternity, which was organized on June 19, 1935, and as Grand Historian of the fraternity from 1924 to 1937. He served as Chairman of the Plant Science Seminar (later the American Society of Pharmacognosy) in 1937; President of the Pennsylvania Academy of Science from 1937 to 1938; and President of the Pittsburgh chapter of the American Pharmaceutical Association (1919-1920). As President, Barbaker encouraged the expansion of the association and the recognition of pharmacy as a profession. In 1920, the Pittsburgh chapter formally stated that it was "opposed to any regulation or legislation which does not give the same full recognition to Pharmacy that is accorded to any other necessary profession or technical branch or division of the United States army."

== Contributions to education ==
In addition to early 40 years of teaching, Darbaker served as Chair of Bacteriology of the Pittsburgh College of Pharmacy. His ideas about the education of university students are described by Edward P. Claus as embodying the teaching plan of the College. Classes were organized so that they built upon each other, with students performing practical laboratory work. In both botany and zoology, students began by studying familiar specimens, to build upon existing knowledge and develop confidence, rather than following a taxonomical organization from lower forms to higher ones. Microscopy was introduced in the second year, and bacteriology only in the senior year.

Laboratory and field work were supplemented with a variety of lectures and demonstrations, including the use of technologies such as lantern slides and motion pictures, to make instruction "interesting, instructive and enjoyable". Described as an "inveterate collector", Darbaker used displays of plant and animal specimens from his own collections for classes and presentations. Darbaker was an avid photographer, developing his own slides and using his slides and movies in classes and in presentations to scholarly societies.

Darbaker wrote several texts and other books including A manual of microscopy (1920) and A manual of histological pharmacognosy and bacteriology (1921). Following the death of Henry Kraemer in 1924, Darbaker became a co-editor of the 1928 edition of Kraemer's Scientific and Applied Pharmacognosy, reviewed as "a credit to the American leaders in pharmacognosy".

== Bibliography ==
- Darbaker, Leasure Kline (1920). A manual of microscopy. Pittsburgh College of Pharmacy.
- Darbaker, Leasure Kline (1921). A manual of histological pharmacognosy and bacteriology. Pittsburgh College of Pharmacy.
- Darbaker, Leasure Kline (1940). Poisonous Plants of Western Pennsylvania. Pharmacognosy Laboratory, School of Pharmacy, University of Pittsburgh.
- Darbaker, Leasure Kline (1940). Some medicinal plants of western Pennsylvania. Pharmacognosy Laboratory, School of Pharmacy, University of Pittsburgh.
- Kraemer, Henry (1928). Newcomb, Edwin L.; Darbaker, Leasure K.; Gathercoal, Edmund N.; Fischer, Earl B. (eds.). Kraemer's scientific and applied pharmacognosy. New York: John Wiley & Sons.

== Darbaker bequests ==
Leasure Kline Darbaker died on February 6, 1949. He was predeceased by his wife, Susan B. King, and left no children. He used his will to create a number of bequests, two of which have the same name, the Darbaker Prize.

=== University of Pittsburgh School of Pharmacy ===
The University of Pittsburgh School of Pharmacy offers Darbaker Scholarships for tuition to full-time students.

=== Pennsylvania Academy of Science ===
The Pennsylvania Academy of Science received a bequest which it used to establish a Darbaker Prize in 1952, to provide grants for work in microscopical biology. The PAS' Darbaker prize funds microscopic research to be published in the Journal of the Pennsylvania Academy of Science.

=== Botanical Society of America ===
The Botanical Society of America also received a bequest, enabling it to award its first Darbaker Prize in 1955 "for meritorious work in the study of microscopic algae". It is currently awarded by the Botanical Society of America and the Phycological Society of America for the best paper on algae in the previous two years. Recipients of the Botanical Society's Darbaker Prize include Isabella Abbott, Sabeeha Merchant, Jack Myers, Mary Belle Allen and Richard C. Starr.

=== American Microscopical Society ===
The American Microscopical Society received a bequest which it used to establish a Darbaker Prize in 1952, to be used for the encouragement and support of publications involving microscopical technique.
