= Eukaryotic Cell (journal) =

Academic purpose microbiology

- Discipline: Eukaryotic microorganisms
- Language: English
- Edited by: Aaron P. Mitchell

Publication details
- History: print: 2002 - 2008 online: 2008 - 2015
- Publisher: American Society for Microbiology (USA)
- Frequency: 12
- Open access: 6 months after final version published
- Impact factor: 2.992 (2016)

Standard abbreviations
- ISO 4: Eukaryot. Cell

Indexing
- ISSN: 1535-9778 (print); 1535-9786 (web)

Links
- Journal homepage

Eukaryotic Cell was an academic journal published by the American Society for Microbiology (ASM). The journal published findings from basic research studies of simple eukaryotic microorganisms. In January 2016, EC was merged into the cross-disciplinary ASM journal mSphere. It is indexed/abstracted in: Agricola, Biological Abstracts, BIOSIS Previews, CAB Abstracts, Cambridge Scientific Abstracts, Current Contents Life Sciences Illustrata, MEDLINE, Science Citation Index Expanded, Summon, and more.
