= Journal of Phycology =

- Discipline: Phycology
- Language: English
- Edited by: Kirsten Müller, Andrew Allen, Melinda Coleman, Sonya Dyhrman, Christopher Lane, Thomas Mock

Publication details
- History: 1965-present
- Publisher: John Wiley & Sons, Inc. on behalf of the Phycological Society of America (United States)
- Frequency: Bimonthly
- Impact factor: 2.923 (2020)

Standard abbreviations
- ISO 4: J. Phycol.

Indexing
- CODEN: JPYLAJ
- ISSN: 0022-3646 (print); 1529-8817 (web)
- LCCN: 70007256
- OCLC no.: 746955569

Links
- Journal homepage; Online access; Online archive

The Journal of Phycology is a bimonthly peer-reviewed scientific journal of phycology (the study of algae), published by John Wiley & Sons, Inc. on behalf of the Phycological Society of America. The journal was established in 1965 and published quarterly until 1992, when it changed to a bimonthly format.

== Abstracting and indexing ==
The journal is abstracted and indexed in:

- AGRICOLA
- Aquatic Sciences & Fisheries Abstracts
- Biological Abstracts
- BIOSIS Previews
- CABI databases
- CAB HEALTH
- Chemical Abstracts Service
- Current Contents/Agriculture, Biology & Environmental Sciences
- EBSCO databases
- Global Health
- InfoTrac
- ProQuest databases
- Science Citation Index
- The Zoological Record

According to the Journal Citation Reports, the journal has a 2020 impact factor of 2.923, ranking it 22nd out of 111 journals in the category "Marine & Freshwater Biology" and 76th out of 235 journals in the category "Plant Sciences".
