= Phycological Society of America =

Professional society for the advancement the study of algae

- Abbreviation: PSA
- Formation: 1946
- Type: Professional Society
- Purpose: to promote research and teaching in phycology
- Fields: Phycology
- President: Juliet Brodie
- Website: https://www.psaalgae.org/

The Phycological Society of America (PSA) is a professional society, founded in 1946, that is dedicated to the advancement of phycology, the study of algae. PSA is responsible for the publication of Journal of Phycology and organizes annual conferences among other events that aid in the advancement of related algal sciences. PSA also helps fund the scientific database, AlgaeBase.

Membership in the Phycological Society of America is open to anyone from any nation who is concerned with the physiology, taxonomy, molecular biology, experimental biology, cell biology, and developmental biology of related algae. As of 2012, membership was approximately 2,000 from 63 countries.

== Awards and fellowships ==
The PSA offers multiple grants, fellowships, and awards to researchers across different stages of their career. Winners are typically announced at the annual conference:

- The Harold C. Bold Award, established in 1973, is given for the outstanding graduate student paper(s) presented at the Annual Meeting as determined by the Bold Award Committee.
- The Gerald W. Prescott Award, established in 1983, is given to recognize scholarly work in English in the form of a published book or monograph devoted to phycology published in the last 2 years.
- The Luigi Provasoli Award, established in 1984, is presented annually to the author(s) of the three, or fewer, outstanding papers published in the Journal of Phycology during the previous fiscal year.
- The Ralph A. Lewin Poster Award, established in 2009, is presented to graduate student members of the PSA for the creation and presentation of an original research poster.
- The L. H. Tiffany Award, established in 2015, is awarded to an individual or team who enhances the awareness or importance of algae through an original work within the previous 3 years.
- The Norma J. Lang Fellowship is awarded to an early career researcher for the following three years to provide starting funds for an algae-related research project.
- The Award of Excellence, This award has been established to recognize phycologists who have demonstrated sustained scholarly contributions in and impact on the field of phycology over their careers. These individuals have also provided service to PSA as well as other phycological societies.

== Meetings ==
The PSA organizes annual meetings, often held with other organizations or societies supporting algal research, including American Society of Plant Biologists and Botanical Society of America The most recent PSA meeting (in 2024) was held in Seattle, WA in coordination with the International Phycological Congress and the International Society of Protistologists.
