= Small nucleolar RNA SNORA40 =

Member of the H/ACA class of small nucleolar RNA

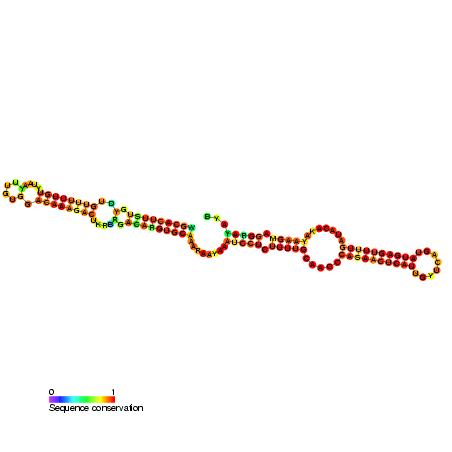
- Predicted secondary structure and sequence conservation of SNORA40

Identifiers
- Symbol: SNORA40
- Alt. Symbols: snoACA40
- Rfam: RF00561

Other data
- RNA type: Gene; snRNA; snoRNA; HACA-box
- Domain: Eukaryota
- GO: GO:0006396 GO:0005730
- SO: SO:0000594
- PDB structures: PDBe

In molecular biology, the small nucleolar RNA ACA40 belongs to the H/ACA family of snoRNAs and guides the pseudouridylation of 28S rRNA subunit at position U4565. snoRNA ACA40 was discovered using large-scale cloning by Kiss et al. (2004) from a HeLa cell extract immunoprecipitated with an anti-GAR1 antibody. It is predicted to guide the pseudouridylation of residues 28S rRNA U4546 and 18S rRNA 1174. The pseudouridylation of these residues was reported by Ofengand and Bakin (1997) and Maden (1990). ACA1, ACA8, ACA18, ACA25, ACA32 and ACA40 and the C/D box snoRNAs mgh28S-2409 and mgh28S-2411 share the same host gene (MGC5306).
