= PUS1 =

Available structures
PDB	Ortholog search: PDBe RCSB
PDB	List of PDB id codes 4IQM, 4ITS, 4J37, 4NZ6, 4NZ7

Identifiers
- Aliases: PUS1, MLASA1, pseudouridylate synthase 1, pseudouridine synthase 1
- External IDs: OMIM: 608109; MGI: 1929237; HomoloGene: 5931; GeneCards: PUS1; OMA:PUS1 - orthologs

Gene location (Human)
Chr.	Chromosome 12 (human)
Band	12q24.33	Start	131,929,200 bp
Band	12q24.33	End	131,945,896 bp

Gene location (Mouse)
Chr.	Chromosome 5 (mouse)
Band	5|5 F	Start	110,921,533 bp
Band	5|5 F	End	110,928,525 bp
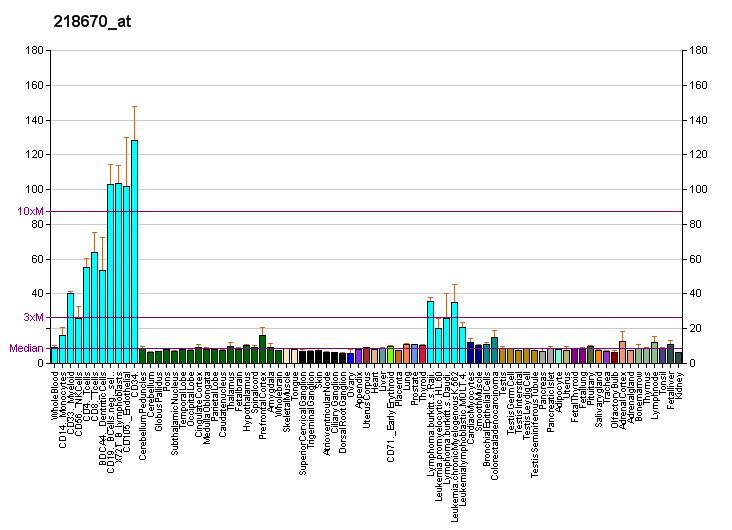
RNA expression pattern
Bgee	Human / Mouse (ortholog); Top expressed in: granulocyte; mucosa of transverse colon; right lobe of liver; gonad; spleen; right adrenal gland; left adrenal gland; body of pancreas; left adrenal cortex; right adrenal cortex / Top expressed in: yolk sac; primitive streak; right kidney; proximal tubule; endothelial cell of lymphatic vessel; seminal vesicula; epiblast; embryo; ventricular zone; lip; More reference expression data
BioGPS	More reference expression data
Gene ontology
Molecular function	pseudouridylate synthase activity; isomerase activity; RNA binding; pseudouridine synthase activity; tRNA binding; steroid receptor RNA activator RNA binding; tRNA pseudouridine synthase activity
Cellular component	mitochondrial matrix; mitochondrion; nucleus
Biological process	RNA modification; pseudouridine synthesis; tRNA processing; mitochondrial tRNA pseudouridine synthesis; tRNA pseudouridine synthesis; mRNA pseudouridine synthesis
Sources:Amigo / QuickGO
Orthologs
Species	Human	Mouse
Entrez	80324	56361
Ensembl	ENSG00000177192	ENSMUSG00000029507
UniProt	Q9Y606	Q9WU56
RefSeq (mRNA)	NM_001002019; NM_001002020; NM_025215	NM_001025561; NM_001025562; NM_019700; NM_001347390; NM_001359218 NM_001359219
RefSeq (protein)	NP_001002019; NP_001002020; NP_079491	NP_001020732; NP_001020733; NP_001334319; NP_062674; NP_001346147 NP_001346148
Location (UCSC)	Chr 12: 131.93 – 131.95 Mb	Chr 5: 110.92 – 110.93 Mb
PubMed search
- Wikidata
View/Edit Human	View/Edit Mouse

tRNA pseudouridine synthase A is an enzyme that in humans is encoded by the PUS1 gene.

PUS1 converts uridine into pseudouridine after the nucleotide has been incorporated into RNA. Pseudouridine may have a functional role in tRNAs and may assist in the peptidyl transfer reaction of rRNAs.[supplied by OMIM]. The mutations in PUS1 gene has been linked to mitochondrial myopathy and sideroblastic anemia.

== See also ==
- Pseudouridine kinase
- Mitochondrial tRNA pseudouridine27/28 synthase
- TRNA pseudouridine38/39 synthase
- TRNA pseudouridine32 synthase
