= Small nucleolar RNA SNORA33 =

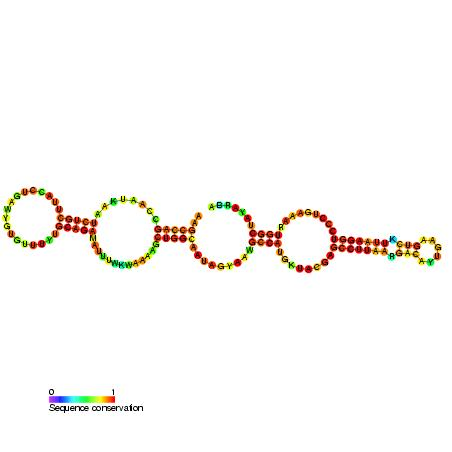
- Predicted secondary structure and sequence conservation of SNORA33

Identifiers
- Symbol: SNORA33
- Alt. Symbols: snoACA33
- Rfam: RF00438

Other data
- RNA type: Gene; snRNA; snoRNA; HACA-box
- Domain: Eukaryota
- GO: GO:0006396 GO:0005730
- SO: SO:0000594
- PDB structures: PDBe

In molecular biology, SNORA33 (also known as ACA33) is a member of the H/ACA class of small nucleolar RNA that guide the sites of modification of uridines to pseudouridines.
