= Small nucleolar RNA psi18S-841/snoR66 =

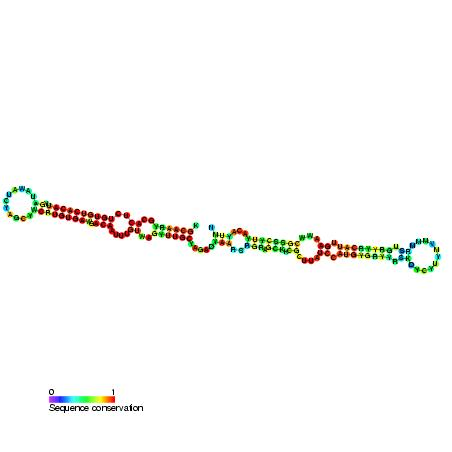
- Predicted secondary structure and sequence conservation of snopsi18S-841

Identifiers
- Symbol: snopsi18S-841
- Rfam: RF00545

Other data
- RNA type: Gene; snRNA; snoRNA; HACA-box
- Domain: Eukaryota
- GO: GO:0006396 GO:0005730
- SO: SO:0000594
- PDB structures: PDBe

In molecular biology, the psi18S-841 is a member of the H/ACA class of snoRNA. This family is responsible for guiding the modification of uridine 841 in Drosophila 18S rRNA to pseudouridine.
