= Small nucleolar RNA psi28S-2876 =

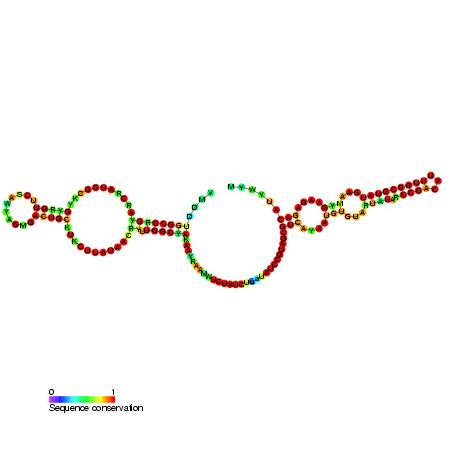
- Predicted secondary structure and sequence conservation of snopsi28S-2876

Identifiers
- Symbol: snopsi28S-2876
- Rfam: RF00541

Other data
- RNA type: Gene; snRNA; snoRNA; HACA-box
- Domain: Eukaryota
- GO: GO:0006396 GO:0005730
- SO: SO:0000594
- PDB structures: PDBe

In molecular biology, Small nucleolar RNA psi28S-2876 (also known as snoRNA psi28S-2876) is a non-coding RNA (ncRNA) molecule which functions in the biogenesis (modification) of other small nuclear RNAs (snRNAs). This type of modifying RNA is located in the nucleolus of the eukaryotic cell which is a major site of snRNA biogenesis. It is known as a small nucleolar RNA (snoRNA) and also often referred to as a 'guide RNA'.

This Drosophila-specific snoRNA is a member of the H/ACA box class of snoRNA and is predicted to be responsible for guiding the modification of uridines 2876 and 2956 to pseudouridine in Drosophila 28S rRNA.
