= Small nucleolar RNA SNORA7 =

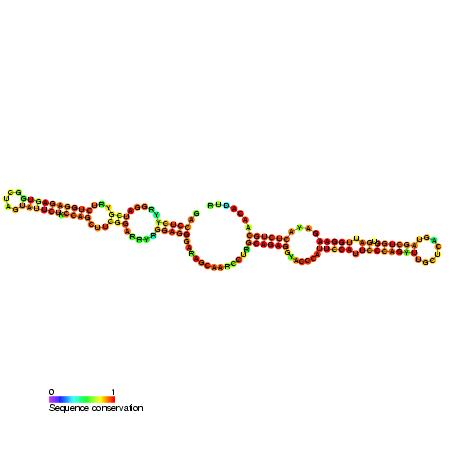
- Predicted secondary structure and sequence conservation of SNORA7

Identifiers
- Symbol: SNORA7
- Alt. Symbols: snoACA7
- Rfam: RF00409

Other data
- RNA type: Gene; snRNA; snoRNA; H/ACA-box
- Domain: Eukaryota
- GO: GO:0006396 GO:0005730
- SO: SO:0000594
- PDB structures: PDBe

In molecular biology, SNORA7 (also known as ACA7) is a member of the H/ACA class of small nucleolar RNA that guide the sites of modification of uridines to pseudouridines.

The family also contains the mouse sequence MBI-141.
