= Small nucleolar RNA SNORA28 =

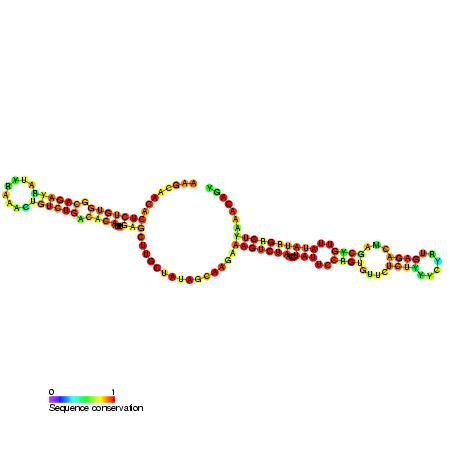
- Predicted secondary structure and sequence conservation of SNORA28

Identifiers
- Symbol: SNORA28
- Alt. Symbols: snoACA28
- Rfam: RF00400

Other data
- RNA type: Gene; snRNA; snoRNA; H/ACA-box
- Domain: Eukaryota
- GO: GO:0006396 GO:0005730
- SO: SO:0001263
- PDB structures: PDBe

In molecular biology, SNORA28 (also known as ACA28) is a member of the H/ACA class of small nucleolar RNA that guide the sites of modification of uridines to pseudouridines.
