= Small nucleolar RNA SNORA58 =

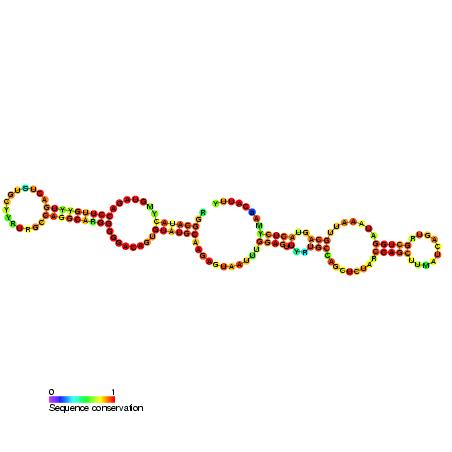
- Predicted secondary structure and sequence conservation of SNORA58

Identifiers
- Symbol: SNORA58
- Alt. Symbols: snoACA58
- Rfam: RF00418

Other data
- RNA type: Gene; snRNA; snoRNA; H/ACA-box
- Domain: Eukaryota
- GO: GO:0006396 GO:0005730
- SO: SO:0000594
- PDB structures: PDBe

In molecular biology, Small nucleolar RNA SNORA58 (also known as ACA58) is a non-coding RNA (ncRNA) molecule which functions in the biogenesis (modification) of other small nuclear RNAs (snRNAs). This type of modifying RNA is located in the nucleolus of the eukaryotic cell which is a major site of snRNA biogenesis. It is known as a small nucleolar RNA (snoRNA) and also often referred to as a "guide RNA".

ACA58 was originally cloned from HeLa cells and belongs to the H/ACA box class of snoRNAs as it has the predicted hairpin-hinge-hairpin-tail structure, has the conserved H/ACA-box motifs and is found associated with GAR1 protein. snoRNA ACA58 is predicted to guide the pseudouridylation of U3823 of 28S ribosomal RNA (rRNA). Pseudouridylation is the (isomerisation of the nucleoside uridine) to the different isomeric form pseudouridine.

snoRNA ACA58 is homologous to the mouse snoRNA sequence MBI-12 described in.
