= Small nucleolar RNA SNORD17 =

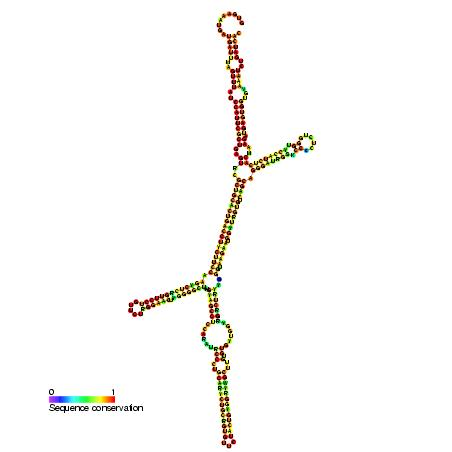
- Predicted secondary structure and sequence conservation of SNORD17

Identifiers
- Symbol: SNORD17
- Alt. Symbols: snoHBI-43
- Rfam: RF00567

Other data
- RNA type: Gene; snRNA; snoRNA; C/D-box
- Domain: Eukaryota
- GO: GO:0006396 GO:0005730
- SO: SO:0000593
- PDB structures: PDBe

In molecular biology, SNORD17 (also known as HBI-43) is a non-coding RNA (ncRNA) molecule which functions in the biogenesis (modification) of other small nuclear RNAs (snRNAs). This type of modifying RNA is located in the nucleolus of the eukaryotic cell which is a major site of snRNA biogenesis. It is known as a small nucleolar RNA (snoRNA) and also often referred to as a guide RNA.

HBI-43 belongs to the C/D box class of snoRNAs which contain the conserved sequence motifs known as the C box (UGAUGA) and the D box (CUGA). Most of the members of the box C/D family function in directing site-specific 2'-O-methylation of substrate RNAs.

This snoRNA is the human orthologue of mouse HBI-43. HBII-43 is predicted to guide 2'O-ribose methylation of 28s ribosomal RNA (rRNA) at position U3797. This residue (U3797) is also predicted to be pseudouridylated (the uridine residue is converted to pseudouridine) by the H/ACA box snoRNA ACA48.
