= Small nucleolar RNA snoR98 =

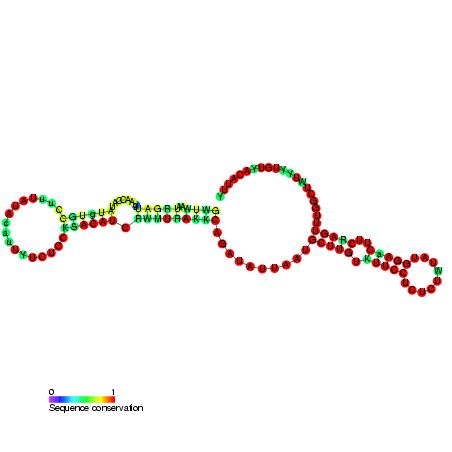
- Predicted secondary structure and sequence conservation of snoR98

Identifiers
- Symbol: snoR98
- Rfam: RF00307

Other data
- RNA type: Gene; snRNA; snoRNA; HACA-box
- Domain: Eukaryota
- GO: GO:0006396 GO:0005730
- SO: SO:0000594
- PDB structures: PDBe

In molecular biology, Small nucleolar RNA snoR98 (also known as snoR98) is a non-coding RNA (ncRNA) which modifies other small nuclear RNAs (snRNAs). It is a member of the H/ACA class of small nucleolar RNA that guide the sites of modification of uridines to pseudouridines. Plant snoR98 was identified in a screen of Arabidopsis thaliana.
