= Ribosylpyrimidine nucleosidase =

Identifiers
- EC no.: 3.2.2.8
- CAS no.: 37288-60-1

Databases
- BRENDA: enzyme data
- ExPASy: NiceZyme view
- KEGG: enzyme entry
- MetaCyc: metabolic pathway
- Rhea: reactions
- PDB structures: RCSB PDB PDBe PDBsum
- Gene Ontology: AmiGO / QuickGO
Search
- PMC: articles
- PubMed: articles
- NCBI: proteins

Ribosylpyrimidine nucleosidase (EC 3.2.2.8) is an enzyme that catalyzes the general chemical reaction

a pyrimidine nucleoside + H_{2}O $\rightleftharpoons$ a pyrimidine base + D-ribose

For example, the enzyme characterised from Pseudomonas fluorescens and Escherichia coli hydrolyses the pyrimidine nucleoside, uridine, to uracil and D-ribose:

uridine
H_{2}O
uracil
+
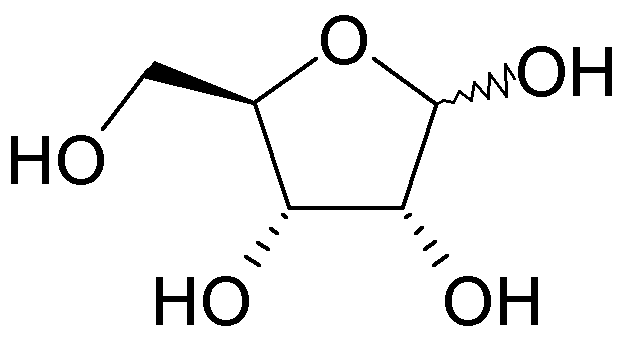
D-ribose

Cytidine is also converted to cytosine by this enzyme.

This enzyme is a hydrolase, specifically a glycosylase that hydrolysea N-glycosyl compounds. The systematic name of this enzyme class is pyrimidine-nucleoside ribohydrolase. Other names in use include N-ribosylpyrimidine nucleosidase, pyrimidine nucleosidase, N-ribosylpyrimidine ribohydrolase, pyrimidine nucleoside hydrolase, RihB, YeiK, and nucleoside ribohydrolase.

== Structural studies ==
As of late 2007, two structures have been solved for this class of enzymes, with PDB accession codes PDB: 1Q8F and PDB: 1YOE.

== See also ==
- Uridine nucleosidase which catalyses the same hydrolysis of uridine
