= Small nucleolar RNA SNORA26 =

Member of the H/ACA class of small nucleolar RNA

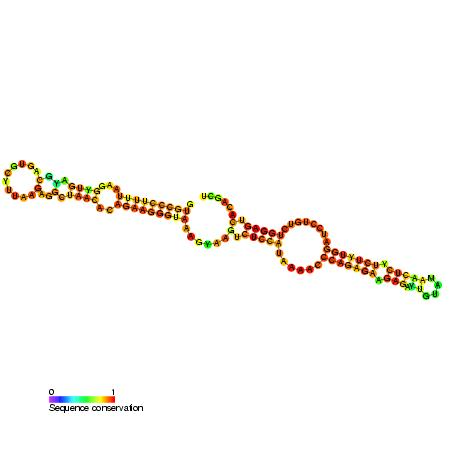
- Predicted secondary structure and sequence conservation of SNORA26

Identifiers
- Symbol: SNORA26
- Alt. Symbols: snoHBI-6
- Rfam: RF00568

Other data
- RNA type: Gene; snRNA; snoRNA; H/ACA-box
- Domain: Eukaryota
- GO: GO:0006396 GO:0005730
- SO: SO:0000594
- PDB structures: PDBe

In molecular biology, SNORA26 is a member of the H/ACA class of small nucleolar RNA that guide the sites of modification of uridines to pseudouridines.

The snoRNA HBI-6 belong to the H/ACA family of snoRNAs, guiding the pseudouridylation of position U4522 of the 28S rRNA. HBI-6 is the human orthologue of mouse MBI-6 snoRNA.
