= Small nucleolar RNA SNORA30 =

Non-coding RNA molecule which functions in the biogenesis of other small nuclear RNAs

Small nucleolar RNA SNORA30/SNORA37 family
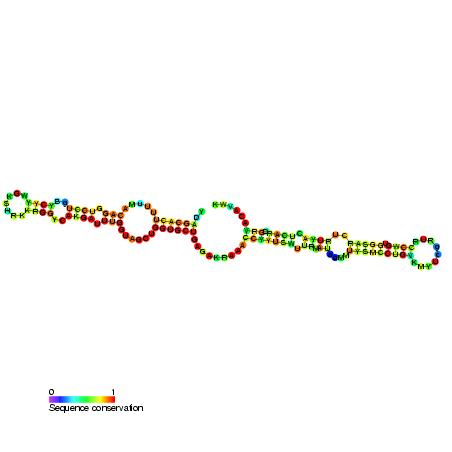
- Predicted secondary structure and sequence conservation of SNORA30

Identifiers
- Symbol: SNORA30
- Alt. Symbols: snoACA30
- Rfam: RF00415

Other data
- RNA type: Gene; snRNA; snoRNA; H/ACA-box
- Domain: Eukaryota
- GO: GO:0006396 GO:0005730
- SO: SO:0000594
- PDB structures: PDBe

In molecular biology, SNORA30 (also known as ACA30) is a non-coding RNA (ncRNA) molecule which functions in the biogenesis (modification) of other small nuclear RNAs (snRNAs). This type of modifying RNA is located in the nucleolus of eukaryotic cells. It is known as a small nucleolar RNA (snoRNA) and also often referred to as a 'guide RNA' as it 'guides' the modification process.

ACA30 was originally cloned from HeLa cells and belongs to the H/ACA box class of snoRNAs based on its structure and the proteins it is associated with. snoRNA ACA30 is predicted to guide the pseudouridylation of U4643 of 28S ribosomal RNA (rRNA). Pseudouridylation is the (isomerisation of the nucleoside uridine) to the different isomeric form pseudouridine(Ψ).

This snoRNA is related to other snoRNAs identified in human (ACA37) and mouse (MBI-26).
