= Small nucleolar RNA SNORA19 =

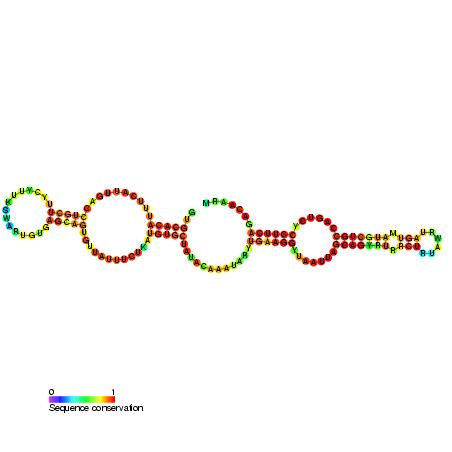
- Predicted secondary structure and sequence conservation of SNORA19

Identifiers
- Symbol: SNORA19
- Alt. Symbols: snoACA19
- Rfam: RF00413

Other data
- RNA type: Gene; snRNA; snoRNA; H/ACA-box
- Domain: Eukaryota
- GO: GO:0006396 GO:0005730
- SO: SO:0000594
- PDB structures: PDBe

In molecular biology, SNORA19 (also known as ACA19) is a member of the H/ACA class of small nucleolar RNA that guide the sites of modification of uridines to pseudouridines.

The family also includes the mouse sequence MBI-51.
