= Small nucleolar RNA SNORA29 =

Member of the H/ACA class of small nucleolar RNA

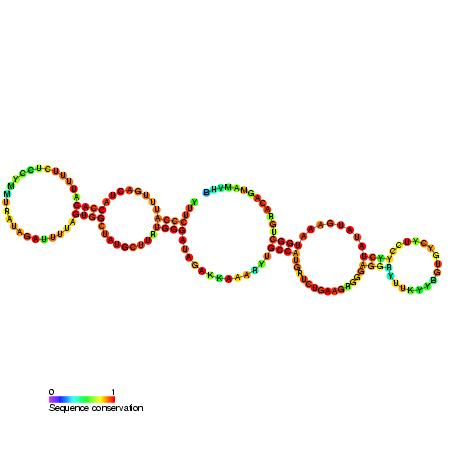
- Predicted secondary structure and sequence conservation of SNORA29

Identifiers
- Symbol: SNORA29
- Alt. Symbols: snoACA29
- Rfam: RF00429

Other data
- RNA type: Gene; snRNA; snoRNA; H/ACA-box
- Domain: Eukaryota
- GO: GO:0006396 GO:0005730
- SO: SO:0000594
- PDB structures: PDBe

In molecular biology, SNORA29 (also known as ACA29) is a member of the H/ACA class of small nucleolar RNA that guide the sites of modification of uridines to pseudouridines.

The family also contains the mouse sequence MBI-39.
