= Small nucleolar RNA SNORA15 =

Member of the H/ACA class of small nucleolar RNA

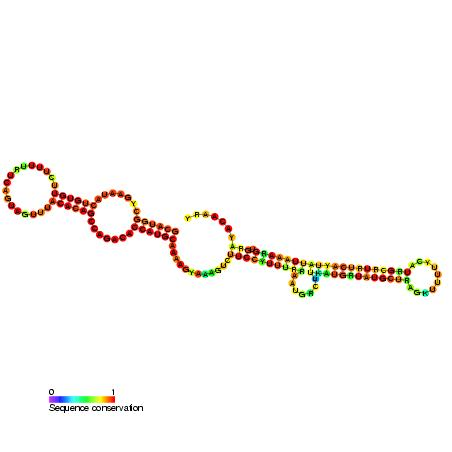
- Predicted secondary structure and sequence conservation of SNORA15

Identifiers
- Symbol: SNORA15
- Alt. Symbols: snoACA15
- Rfam: RF00398

Other data
- RNA type: Gene; snRNA; snoRNA; H/ACA-box
- Domain: Eukaryota
- GO: GO:0006396 GO:0005730
- SO: SO:0000594
- PDB structures: PDBe

In molecular biology, SNORA15 (also known as ACA15) is a member of the H/ACA class of small nucleolar RNA that guide the sites of modification of uridines to pseudouridines.

This family also includes the mouse MBI-79 sequence.
