= Small nucleolar RNA SNORA54 =

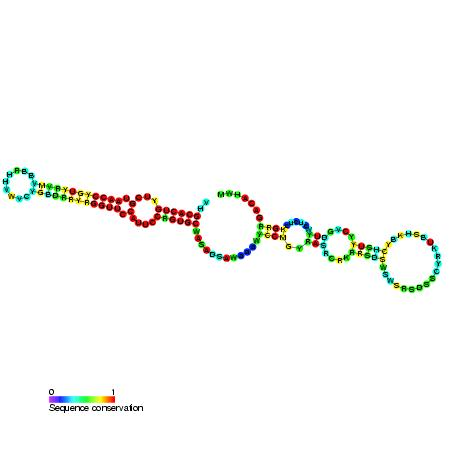
- Predicted secondary structure and sequence conservation of SNORA54

Identifiers
- Symbol: SNORA54
- Alt. Symbols: snoACA54
- Rfam: RF00430

Other data
- RNA type: Gene; snRNA; snoRNA; HACA-box
- Domain: Eukaryota
- GO: GO:0006396 GO:0005730
- SO: SO:0000594
- PDB structures: PDBe

In molecular biology, Small nucleolar RNA SNORA54 (also known as ACA54) is a non-coding RNA (ncRNA) molecule which functions in the biogenesis (modification) of other small nuclear RNAs (snRNAs). This type of modifying RNA is located in the nucleolus of the eukaryotic cell which is a major site of snRNA biogenesis. It is known as a small nucleolar RNA (snoRNA) and also often referred to as a 'guide RNA'. ACA54 was originally cloned from HeLa cells and belongs to the H/ACA box class of snoRNAs as it has the predicted hairpin-hinge-hairpin-tail structure, has the conserved H/ACA-box motifs and is found associated with GAR1 protein. snoRNA ACA54 is predicted to guide the pseudouridylation of U3801 of 28S ribosomal RNA (rRNA). Pseudouridylation is the isomerisation (of the nucleoside uridine) to the different isomeric form pseudouridine.
