= Small nucleolar RNA SNORA4 =

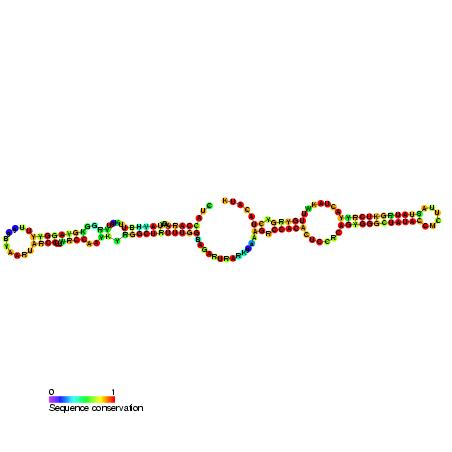
- Predicted secondary structure and sequence conservation of SNORA4

Identifiers
- Symbol: SNORA4
- Alt. Symbols: snoACA4
- Rfam: RF00394

Other data
- RNA type: Gene; snRNA; snoRNA; HACA-box
- Domain: Eukaryota
- GO: GO:0006396 GO:0005730
- SO: SO:0000594
- PDB structures: PDBe

In molecular biology, SNORA4 (also known as ACA4) is a member of the H/ACA class of small nucleolar RNA that guide the sites of modification of uridines to pseudouridines.
