= Small nucleolar RNA SNORA77 =

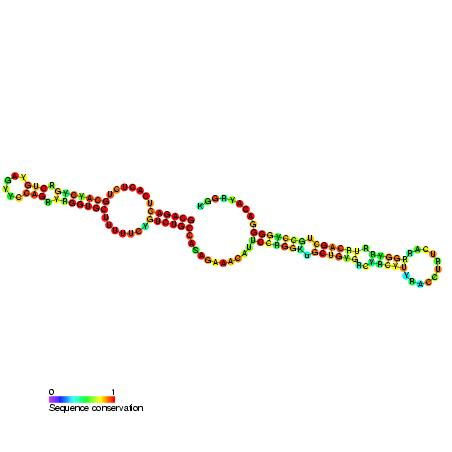
- Predicted secondary structure and sequence conservation of SNORA77

Identifiers
- Symbol: SNORA77
- Rfam: RF00599

Other data
- RNA type: Gene; snRNA; snoRNA; H/ACA-box
- Domain: Eukaryota
- GO: GO:0006396 GO:0005730
- SO: SO:0000594
- PDB structures: PDBe

In molecular biology, Small nucleolar RNA SNORA77 (also known as ACA63) is a non-coding RNA (ncRNA) molecule which functions in the biogenesis (modification) of other small nuclear RNAs (snRNAs). This type of modifying RNA is located in the nucleolus of the eukaryotic cell which is a major site of snRNA biogenesis. It is known as a small nucleolar RNA (snoRNA).

SNORA77 was identified by computational screening and its expression in mouse experimentally verified by Northern blot and primer extension analysis. It belongs to the H/ACA box class of snoRNAs as it has the predicted hairpin-hinge-hairpin-tail structure and conserved H/ACA-box motifs.

SNORA77 is proposed to guide the pseudouridylation of 18S ribosomal RNA (rRNA) residue U814. Pseudouridylation is the isomerisation of the nucleoside uridine to the different isomeric form pseudouridine.
