= Small nucleolar RNA SNORA21 =

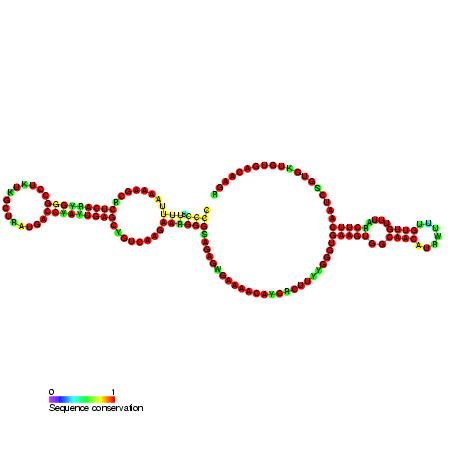
- Predicted secondary structure and sequence conservation of SNORA21

Identifiers
- Symbol: SNORA21
- Alt. Symbols: snoACA21
- Rfam: RF00412

Other data
- RNA type: Gene; snRNA; snoRNA; H/ACA-box
- Domain: Eukaryota
- GO: GO:0006396 GO:0005730
- SO: SO:0000594
- PDB structures: PDBe

In molecular biology, SNORA21 (also known as ACA21) is a member of the H/ACA class of small nucleolar RNA that guide the sites of modification of uridines to pseudouridines.

This family also contains the mouse sequence MBI-3.
