= Small nucleolar RNA SNORA42 =

Small nucleolar RNA SNORA42/SNORA80 family
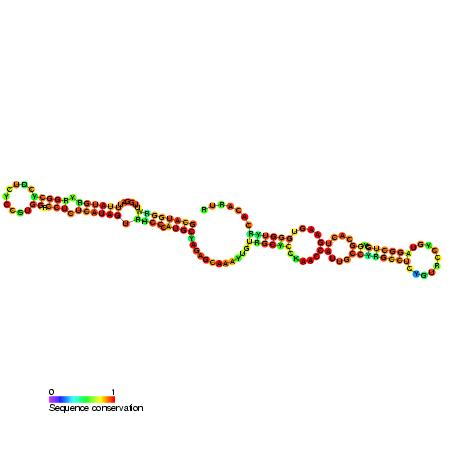
- Predicted secondary structure and sequence conservation of SNORA42

Identifiers
- Symbol: SNORA42
- Alt. Symbols: snoACA42
- Rfam: RF00406
- NCBI Gene: 677823

Other data
- RNA type: Gene; snRNA; snoRNA; H/ACA-box
- Domain: Eukaryota
- GO: GO:0006396 GO:0005730
- SO: SO:0000594
- PDB structures: PDBe

In molecular biology, SNORA42 (also known as ACA42) is a member of the H/ACA class of small nucleolar RNA that guide the sites of modification of uridines to pseudouridines.
