= C9H12N2O6 =

The molecular formula C_{9}H_{12}N_{2}O_{6} (molar mass: 244.20 g/mol, exact mass: 244.0695 u) may refer to:

- Uridine
- Pseudouridine
