= Small nucleolar RNA SNORA76 =

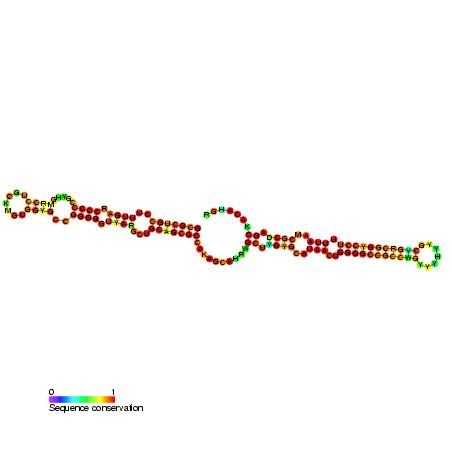
- Predicted secondary structure and sequence conservation of SNORA76

Identifiers
- Symbol: SNORA76
- Rfam: RF00598

Other data
- RNA type: Gene; snRNA; snoRNA; HACA-box
- Domain: Eukaryota
- GO: GO:0006396 GO:0005730
- SO: SO:0000594
- PDB structures: PDBe

In molecular biology, SNORA76 (also known as ACA62) is a non-coding RNA (ncRNA) which modifies other small nuclear RNAs (snRNAs). It is a member of the H/ACA class of small nucleolar RNA that guide the sites of modification of uridines to pseudouridines.

This snoRNA was identified by computational screening and its expression in mouse experimentally verified by Northern blot and primer extension analysis. ACA62 is proposed to guide the pseudouridylation of 18S rRNA U34 and U105.
