= Small nucleolar RNA F1/F2/snoR5a =

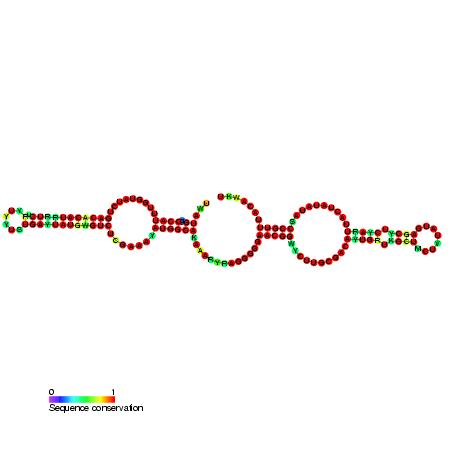
- Predicted secondary structure and sequence conservation of snoF1_F2

Identifiers
- Symbol: snoF1_F2
- Rfam: RF00482

Other data
- RNA type: Gene; snRNA; snoRNA; HACA-box
- Domain: Eukaryota
- GO: GO:0006396 GO:0005730
- SO: SO:0000594
- PDB structures: PDBe

In molecular biology, Small nucleolar RNA F1/F2/snoR5a refers to a group of related non-coding RNA (ncRNA) molecules which function in the biogenesis of other small nuclear RNAs (snRNAs). These small nucleolar RNAs (snoRNAs) are modifying RNAs and usually located in the nucleolus of the eukaryotic cell which is a major site of snRNA biogenesis.

These three snoRNas identified in rice (Oryza sativa), called F1, F2 and snoR5a, belong to the H/ACA box class of snoRNAs as they have the predicted hairpin-hinge-hairpin-tail structure and has the conserved H/ACA-box motifs. The majority of H/ACA box class of snoRNAs are involved in guiding the modification of uridine) to pseudouridine in other RNAs
