= RLUA =

RLUA may refer to:

- TRNA pseudouridine32 synthase, an enzyme
- 23S rRNA pseudouridine746 synthase, an enzyme
