= Small nucleolar RNA psi28S-3316 =

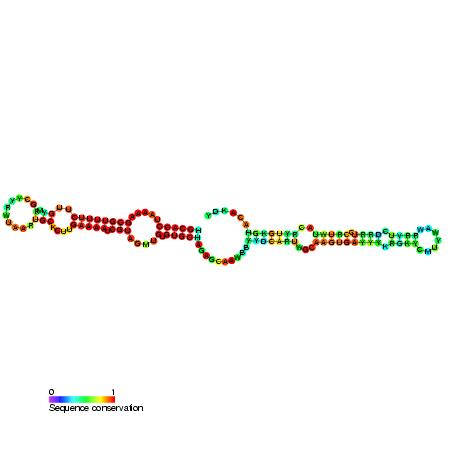
- Predicted secondary structure and sequence conservation of snopsi28S-3316

Identifiers
- Symbol: snopsi28S-3316
- Rfam: RF00546

Other data
- RNA type: Gene; snRNA; snoRNA; HACA-box
- Domain: Eukaryota
- GO: GO:0006396 GO:0005730
- SO: SO:0000594
- PDB structures: PDBe

In molecular biology, Small nucleolar RNA psi28S-3316 is a member of the H/ACA class of snoRNA. This family is responsible for guiding the modification of uridine 3316 in Drosophila 28S rRNA to pseudouridine
