= Small nucleolar RNA SNORA50 =

Non-coding RNA molecule which functions in the biogenesis of other small nuclear RNAs

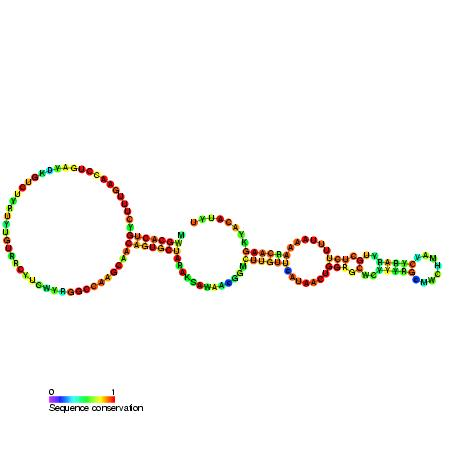
- Predicted secondary structure and sequence conservation of SNORA50

Identifiers
- Symbol: SNORA50
- Alt. Symbols: snoACA50
- Rfam: RF00407

Other data
- RNA type: Gene; snRNA; snoRNA; HACA-box
- Domain: Eukaryota
- GO: GO:0006396 GO:0005730
- SO: SO:0001263
- PDB structures: PDBe

In molecular biology, Small nucleolar RNA SNORA50 (also known as ACA50) is a non-coding RNA (ncRNA) molecule which functions in the biogenesis (modification) of other small nuclear RNAs (snRNAs). This type of modifying RNA is located in the nucleolus of the eukaryotic cell which is a major site of snRNA biogenesis. It is known as a small nucleolar RNA (snoRNA) and also often referred to as a 'guide RNA'. ACA50 was originally cloned from HeLa cells and belongs to the H/ACA box class of snoRNAs as it has the predicted hairpin-hinge-hairpin-tail structure, has the conserved H/ACA-box motifs and is found associated with GAR1 protein. snoRNA ACA50 is predicted to guide the pseudouridylation of U34 and U105 of 18S ribosomal RNA (rRNA). Pseudouridylation is the (isomerisation of the nucleoside uridine) to the different isomeric form pseudouridine.
