= Small nucleolar RNA SNORA55 =

Non-coding guide RNA associated with GAR1 protein

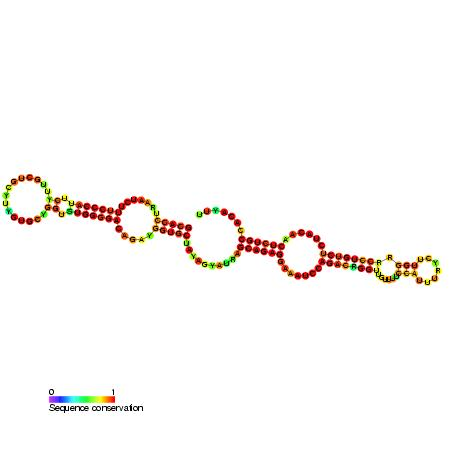
- Predicted secondary structure and sequence conservation of SNORA55

Identifiers
- Symbol: SNORA55
- Alt. Symbols: snoACA55
- Rfam: RF00431

Other data
- RNA type: Gene; snRNA; snoRNA; HACA-box
- Domain: Eukaryota
- GO: GO:0006396 GO:0005730
- SO: SO:0000594
- PDB structures: PDBe

In molecular biology, Small nucleolar RNA SNORA55 (also known as ACA55) is a non-coding RNA (ncRNA) molecule which functions in the biogenesis (modification) of other small nuclear RNAs (snRNAs). This type of modifying RNA is located in the nucleolus of the eukaryotic cell which is a major site of snRNA biogenesis. It is known as a small nucleolar RNA (snoRNA) and also often referred to as a 'guide RNA'. ACA55 was originally cloned from HeLa cells and belongs to the H/ACA box class of snoRNAs as it has the predicted hairpin-hinge-hairpin-tail structure, has the conserved H/ACA-box motifs and is found associated with GAR1 protein. snoRNA ACA55 is predicted to guide the pseudouridylation of U36 of 18S ribosomal RNA (rRNA). Pseudouridylation is the (isomerisation of the nucleoside uridine) to the different isomeric form pseudouridine.
