= 23S rRNA (pseudouridine1915-N3)-methyltransferase =

Class of enzymes

23S rRNA (pseudouridine^{1915}-N^{3})-methyltransferase

Identifiers
- EC no.: 2.1.1.177

Databases
- IntEnz: IntEnz view
- BRENDA: BRENDA entry
- ExPASy: NiceZyme view
- KEGG: KEGG entry
- MetaCyc: metabolic pathway
- PRIAM: profile
- PDB structures: RCSB PDB PDBe PDBsum
Search
- PMC: articles
- PubMed: articles
- NCBI: proteins

23S rRNA (pseudouridine^{1915}-N^{3})-methyltransferase (EC 2.1.1.177, YbeA, RlmH, pseudouridine methyltransferase, m3Psi methyltransferase, Psi1915-specific methyltransferase, rRNA large subunit methyltransferase H) is an enzyme with systematic name S-adenosyl-L-methionine:23S rRNA (pseudouridine^{1915}-N^{3})-methyltransferase. This enzyme catalyses the following chemical reaction

S-adenosyl-L-methionine + pseudouridine^{1915} in 23S rRNA $\rightleftharpoons$ S-adenosyl-L-homocysteine + N^{3}-methylpseudouridine^{1915} in 23S rRNA

YbeA does not methylate uridine at position 1915.
