= T arm =

Region on a tRNA molecule

Transfer RNA

The T-arm or T-loop is a specialized region on the tRNA molecule which acts as a special recognition site for the ribosome to form a tRNA-ribosome complex during protein biosynthesis or translation (biology).

The T-arm has two components to it; the T-stem and the T-loop.

- The T-stem consists of a series of paired nucleotides, typically 5 pairs, but sometimes as few as 1 or as many as 6.
- The T-loop is also often known as the TΨC arm due to the presence of ribothymidine (T/m5U), pseudouridine and cytidine residues. It folds into a unique structural element consisting of stacked bases in a U-turn, now termed the "T-loop motif".
  - In archaea, the m5U is replaced with N1-methylpseudouridine (m1Ψ). The m5U/m1Ψ modification at position 54 is thought to increase structural stability.

Organisms with T-loop lacking tRNA exhibit a much lower level of aminoacylation and EF-Tu-binding than in organisms which have the native tRNA.

The T-loop motif has been identified as a ubiquitous structural element in a number of noncoding RNAs. At least one other instance of the T-loop, found in rRNA, also carries the m5U modification.
