= Small nucleolar RNA SNORA12 =

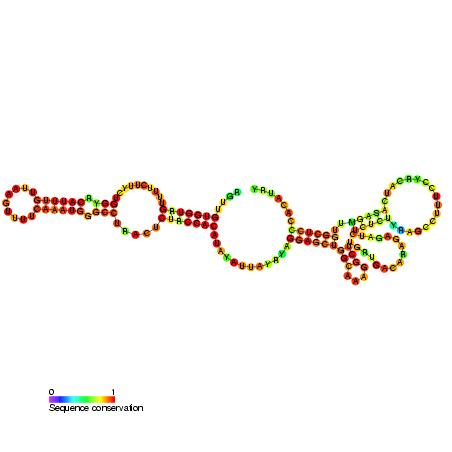
- Predicted secondary structure and sequence conservation of SNORA12

Identifiers
- Symbol: SNORA12
- Alt. Symbols: snoU108
- Rfam: RF00586

Other data
- RNA type: Gene; snRNA; snoRNA; H/ACA-box
- Domain: Eukaryota
- GO: GO:0006396 GO:0005730
- SO: SO:0000594
- PDB structures: PDBe

In molecular biology, U108 belongs to the H/ACA family of snoRNAs. The sequence is predicted to guide the pseudouridylation of the U372 residue in the 28S rRNA subunit. However it has not been reported as a pseudouridylation site.
