= Small nucleolar RNA SNORA1 =

Member of the H/ACA class of small nucleolar RNA

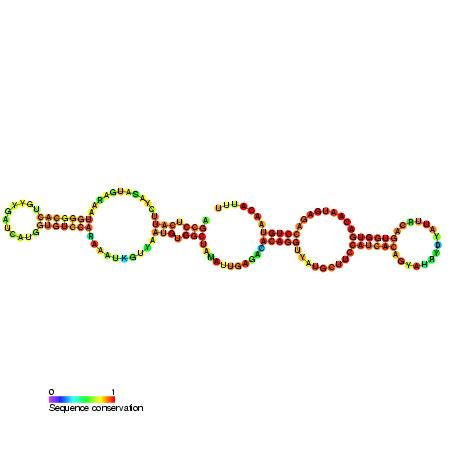
- Predicted secondary structure and sequence conservation of SNORA1

Identifiers
- Symbol: SNORA1
- Alt. Symbols: snoACA1
- Rfam: RF00408

Other data
- RNA type: Gene; snRNA; snoRNA; HACA-box
- Domain: Eukaryota
- SO: SO:0000594
- PDB structures: PDBe

In molecular biology, SNORA1 (also known as ACA1) is a member of the H/ACA class of small nucleolar RNA that guide the sites of modification of uridines to pseudouridines.
