= Small nucleolar RNA SNORA57 =

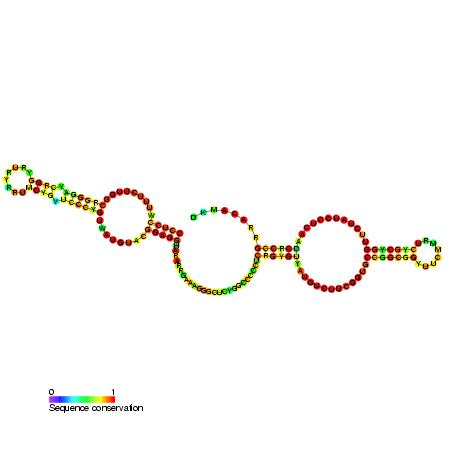
- Predicted secondary structure and sequence conservation of SNORA57

Identifiers
- Symbol: SNORA57
- Alt. Symbols: U99
- Rfam: RF00191

Other data
- RNA type: Gene; snRNA; snoRNA; H/ACA-box
- Domain: Eukaryota
- GO: GO:0006396 GO:0005730
- SO: SO:0000594
- PDB structures: PDBe

In molecular biology, Small nucleolar RNA SNORA57 (also known as U99 and MBI-64) is a non-coding RNA (ncRNA) molecule which functions in the biogenesis (modification) of other small nuclear RNAs (snRNAs). This type of modifying RNA is located in the nucleolus of the eukaryotic cell which is a major site of snRNA biogenesis. It is known as a small nucleolar RNA (snoRNA) and also often referred to as a "guide RNA".

ACA57 was originally cloned from a mouse brain library and belongs to the H/ACA box class of snoRNAs as it has the predicted hairpin-hinge-hairpin-tail structure, has the conserved H/ACA-box motifs and is found associated with GAR1 protein. snoRNA ACA57 is predicted to guide the pseudouridylation of U1004 of 18S ribosomal RNA (rRNA). Pseudouridylation is the isomerisation of the nucleoside uridine to the different isomeric form pseudouridine.
