= U99 =

U99 may refer to:

- German submarine U-99, various vessels
- HMS Ibis (U99), a sloop of the Royal Navy
- Small nucleolar RNA SNORA57
