= Small nucleolar RNA SNORA32 =

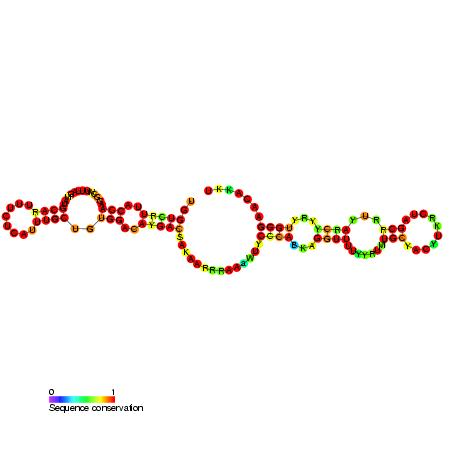
- Predicted secondary structure and sequence conservation of SNORA32

Identifiers
- Symbol: SNORA32
- Alt. Symbols: snoACA32
- Rfam: RF00421

Other data
- RNA type: Gene; snRNA; snoRNA; HACA-box
- Domain: Eukaryota
- GO: GO:0006396 GO:0005730
- SO: SO:0000594
- PDB structures: PDBe

In molecular biology, SNORA32 (also known as ACA32) is a member of the H/ACA class of small nucleolar RNA that guide the sites of modification of uridines to pseudouridines.
