= TRNA (pseudouridine54-N1)-methyltransferase =

TRNA (pseudouridine^{54}-N^{1})-methyltransferase

Identifiers
- EC no.: 2.1.1.257

Databases
- IntEnz: IntEnz view
- BRENDA: BRENDA entry
- ExPASy: NiceZyme view
- KEGG: KEGG entry
- MetaCyc: metabolic pathway
- PRIAM: profile
- PDB structures: RCSB PDB PDBe PDBsum
Search
- PMC: articles
- PubMed: articles
- NCBI: proteins

TRNA (pseudouridine^{54}-N^{1})-methyltransferase (EC 2.1.1.257, TrmY, m1Psi methyltransferase) is an enzyme with systematic name S-adenosyl-L-methionine:tRNA (pseudouridine54-N1)-methyltransferase. This enzyme catalyses the following chemical reaction

S-adenosyl-L-methionine + pseudouridine^{54} in tRNA $\rightleftharpoons$ S-adenosyl-L-homocysteine + N^{1}-methylpseudouridine^{54} in tRNA

This archaeal enzyme is specific for the 54 position.
