= Small nucleolar RNA SNORA44 =

Non-coding RNA molecule which functions in the biogenesis of other small nuclear RNAs

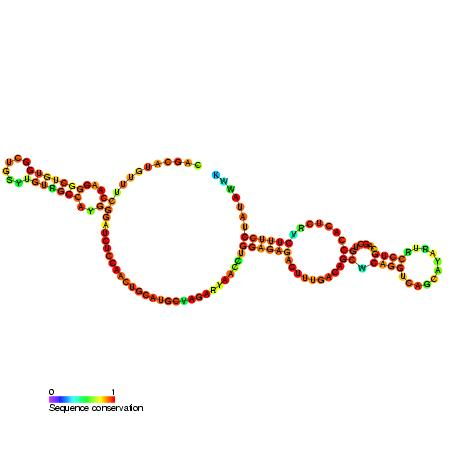
- Predicted secondary structure and sequence conservation of SNORA44

Identifiers
- Symbol: SNORA44
- Alt. Symbols: snoACA44
- Rfam: RF00405

Other data
- RNA type: Gene; snRNA; snoRNA; H/ACA-box
- Domain: Eukaryota
- GO: GO:0006396 GO:0005730
- SO: SO:0000594
- PDB structures: PDBe

In molecular biology, Small nucleolar RNA SNORA44 (also known as ACA44) is a non-coding RNA (ncRNA) molecule which functions in the biogenesis (modification) of other small nuclear RNAs (snRNAs). This type of modifying RNA is located in the nucleolus of the eukaryotic cell which is a major site of snRNA biogenesis. It is known as a small nucleolar RNA (snoRNA) and also often referred to as a 'guide RNA'.

ACA44 was originally cloned from HeLa cells and belongs to the H/ACA box class of snoRNAs as it has the predicted hairpin-hinge-hairpin-tail structure, has the conserved H/ACA-box motifs and is found associated with GAR1 protein. snoRNA ACA44 is predicted to guide the pseudouridylation of U822 and U686 of 18S ribosomal RNA (rRNA). Pseudouridylation is the (isomerisation of the nucleoside uridine) to the different isomeric form pseudouridine.

snoRNA ACA44 is homologous to the mouse snoRNA sequence MBI-64 described by Hüttenhofer et al in 2001.
