= Small nucleolar RNA SNORA18 =

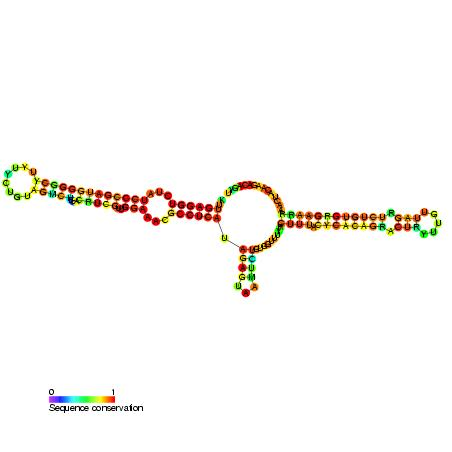
- Predicted secondary structure and sequence conservation of SNORA18

Identifiers
- Symbol: SNORA18
- Alt. Symbols: snoACA18
- Rfam: RF00425

Other data
- RNA type: Gene; snRNA; snoRNA; HACA-box
- Domain: Eukaryota
- GO: GO:0006396 GO:0005730
- SO: SO:0000594
- PDB structures: PDBe

In molecular biology, SNORA18 (also known as ACA18) is a member of the H/ACA class of small nucleolar RNA that guide the sites of modification of uridines to pseudouridines.
