= TRNA pseudouridine31 synthase =

tRNA pseudouridine^{31} synthase

Identifiers
- EC no.: 5.4.99.42

Databases
- IntEnz: IntEnz view
- BRENDA: BRENDA entry
- ExPASy: NiceZyme view
- KEGG: KEGG entry
- MetaCyc: metabolic pathway
- PRIAM: profile
- PDB structures: RCSB PDB PDBe PDBsum
Search
- PMC: articles
- PubMed: articles
- NCBI: proteins

tRNA pseudouridine^{31} synthase (EC 5.4.99.42, Pus6p) is an enzyme with systematic name tRNA-uridine^{31} uracil mutase. This enzyme catalyses the following chemical reaction

tRNA uridine^{31} $\rightleftharpoons$ tRNA pseudouridine^{31}

The enzyme specifically acts on uridine^{31} in tRNA.
