= Uridine nucleosidase =

Class of enzymes

Identifiers
- EC no.: 3.2.2.3
- CAS no.: 9025-47-2

Databases
- BRENDA: enzyme data
- ExPASy: NiceZyme view
- KEGG: enzyme entry
- MetaCyc: metabolic pathway
- Rhea: reactions
- PDB structures: RCSB PDB PDBe PDBsum
- Gene Ontology: AmiGO / QuickGO
Search
- PMC: articles
- PubMed: articles
- NCBI: proteins

Uridine nucleosidase (EC 3.2.2.3) is an enzyme that catalyzes the chemical reaction

uridine
H_{2}O
uracil
+
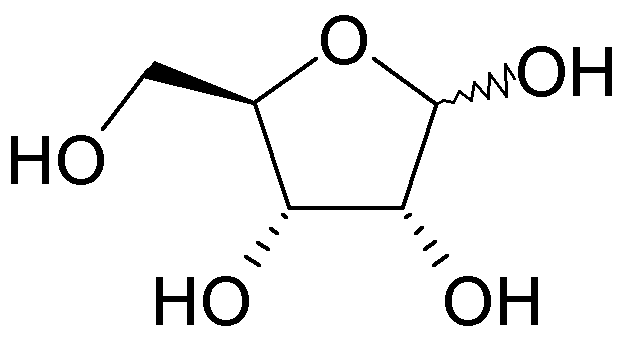
D-ribose

The enzyme characterised from yeast hydrolyses the pyrimidine nucleoside, uridine, to uracil and D-ribose. The enzyme is also found in plants.

This enzyme is a hydrolase, specifically a glycosylase that hydrolyses N-glycosyl compounds. The systematic name of this enzyme class is uridine ribohydrolase. This enzyme is also called uridine hydrolase.

== Structural studies ==
As of late 2007, 23 structures have been solved for this class of enzymes, with PDB accession codes PDB: 1EMH, PDB: 1EMJ, PDB: 1EUG, PDB: 1FLZ, PDB: 1OKB, PDB: 1SSP, PDB: 1UDG, PDB: 1UDH, PDB: 1UDI, PDB: 1UGH, PDB: 1UUG, PDB: 1YUO, PDB: 2BOO, PDB: 2C53, PDB: 2C56, PDB: 2EUG, PDB: 2J8X, PDB: 2SSP, PDB: 2UUG, PDB: 3EUG, PDB: 4EUG, PDB: 4SKN, and PDB: 5EUG.
