= N1-Methylpseudouridine =

Names
- IUPAC name 5-[(2S,3R,4S,5R)-3,4-Dihydroxy-5-(hydroxymethyl)oxolan-2-yl]-1-methylpyrimidine-2,4-dione
- Other names 1-Methylpseudouridine; m1Ψ

Identifiers
CAS Number	13860-38-3
3D model (JSmol)	Interactive image
ChEBI	CHEBI:19068
ChemSpider	89930
PubChem CID	99543
UNII	09RAD4M6WF
CompTox Dashboard (EPA)	DTXSID50160724
- InChI: InChI=1S/C10H14N2O6/c1-12-2-4(9(16)11-10(12)17)8-7(15)6(14)5(3-13)18-8/h2,5-8,13-15H,3H2,1H3,(H,11,16,17)/t5-,6-,7-,8+/m1/s1 Key: UVBYMVOUBXYSFV-XUTVFYLZSA-N
- SMILES: O[C@H]1[C@@](O[C@H](CO)[C@H]1O)(C=2C(=O)NC(=O)N(C)C2)[H]

Properties
Chemical formula	C_{10}H_{14}N_{2}O_{6}
Molar mass	258.23 g/mol
- Except where otherwise noted, data are given for materials in their standard state (at 25 °C [77 °F], 100 kPa). Infobox references

N1-Methylpseudouridine (abbreviated m1Ψ) is a natural archaeal tRNA component, and "hypermodified" pyrimidine nucleoside used in biochemistry and molecular biology for in vitro transcription and is found in the SARS-CoV-2 mRNA vaccines tozinameran (Pfizer–BioNTech) and elasomeran (Moderna).

== Properties ==
N1-Methylpseudouridine is the methylated derivative of pseudouridine. It is used in in vitro transcription and for the production of RNA vaccines. In vertebrates, it stimulates significantly less activation of the innate immune response compared to uridine, while the translation is stronger. In protein biosynthesis, it is read like uridine and enables comparatively high protein yields. The nucleoside itself can be made by chemical methylation of pseudouridine.

While pseudouridine can wobble-pair with bases other than A, work examining COVID-19 modRNA vaccines that replace all their uridines with N1-methylpseudouridine show faithful protein production.

More recent work from Mulroney and colleagues has identified that N1-methylpseudouridine can give rise to slippery sequences that promote ribosomal frameshifting. This issue is readily correctable through the replacement of slippery sequences with synonymous codons. The frameshifting is not known to contribute to any safety issues with regard to current mRNA vaccines, nor has it been shown to limit their effectiveness. In work from Mulroney and colleagues, mice immunized with the Bnt162b2 vaccine (Pfizer–BioNTech) demonstrate a greater T cell response against in-frame spike protein than those receiving Vaxzevria (Oxford–AstraZeneca), despite the latter not demonstrating meaningful production of frameshifted sequences. In human donors, the degree of recognition of frameshifted peptides by T cells varies greatly, suggesting that the extent to which frameshifting occurs may vary greatly as well. Importantly, frameshifted products are rare but well-defined events in protein production, including in viral infections, and can give rise to sequences that can be targeted by the immune system. Furthermore, despite significant disparity at the level of nucleotide sequences between COVID-19 vaccines from Pfizer/BioNTech and Moderna, the safety profile of both vaccines is comparable, arguing against any meaningful effect of frameshifting on the safety profile of the vaccines.

== History ==
In 2016, a protocol for large-scale synthesis of the nucleoside triphosphate from the ribonucleoside was published.

In 2017–2018 it was tested in vaccines against Zika, HIV-1, influenza, and Ebola.
