= TRNA pseudouridine38/39 synthase =

Class of enzymes

tRNA pseudouridine^{38/39} synthase

Identifiers
- EC no.: 5.4.99.45

Databases
- BRENDA: enzyme data
- ExPASy: NiceZyme view
- KEGG: enzyme entry
- MetaCyc: metabolic pathway
- Rhea: reactions
- PDB structures: RCSB PDB PDBe PDBsum
Search
- PMC: articles
- PubMed: articles
- NCBI: proteins

tRNA pseudouridine^{38/39} synthase (EC 5.4.99.45, Deg1, Pus3p, pseudouridine synthase 3) is an enzyme with systematic name tRNA-uridine^{38/39} uracil mutase. This enzyme catalyses the following chemical reaction

tRNA uridine^{38/39} $\rightleftharpoons$ tRNA pseudouridine^{38/39}

The enzyme from Saccharomyces cerevisiae is active only towards uridine^{38} and uridine^{39}.

== See also ==
- PUS1
- Mitochondrial tRNA pseudouridine27/28 synthase
