= Mitochondrial tRNA pseudouridine27/28 synthase =

Class of enzymes

Mitochondrial tRNA pseudouridine^{27/28} synthase

Identifiers
- EC no.: 5.4.99.44

Databases
- BRENDA: enzyme data
- ExPASy: NiceZyme view
- KEGG: enzyme entry
- MetaCyc: metabolic pathway
- Rhea: reactions
- PDB structures: RCSB PDB PDBe PDBsum
Search
- PMC: articles
- PubMed: articles
- NCBI: proteins

Mitochondrial tRNA pseudouridine^{27/28} synthase (EC 5.4.99.44, Pus2, Pus2p, RNA:pseudouridine synthases 2) is an enzyme with systematic name mitochondrial tRNA-uridine^{27/28} uracil mutase. This enzyme catalyses the following chemical reaction

mitochondrial tRNA uridine^{27/28} $\rightleftharpoons$ mitochondrial tRNA pseudouridine^{27/28}

The mitochondrial enzyme Pus2p is specific for position 27 or 28 in mitochondrial tRNA.

== See also ==
- PUS1
- TRNA pseudouridine38/39 synthase
