= U98 small nucleolar RNA =

Small nucleolar RNA SNORA16B/SNORA16A family
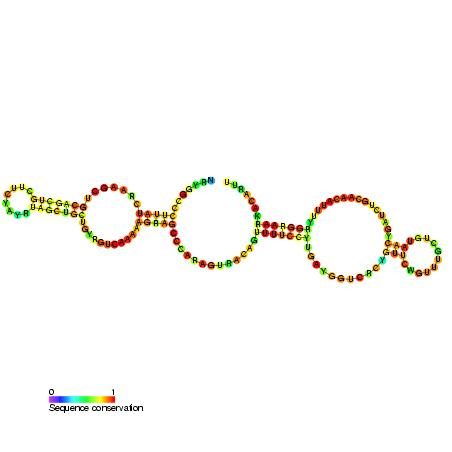
- Predicted secondary structure and sequence conservation of SNORA16

Identifiers
- Symbol: SNORA16
- Alt. Symbols: U98
- Rfam: RF00190

Other data
- RNA type: Gene; snRNA; snoRNA; H/ACA-box
- Domain: Eukaryota
- GO: GO:0006396 GO:0005730
- SO: SO:0000594
- PDB structures: PDBe

U98 small nucleolar RNA also is a non-coding RNA (ncRNA) molecule which functions in the biogenesis (modification) of other small nuclear RNAs (snRNAs). This type of modifying RNA is located in the nucleolus of the eukaryotic cell which is a major site of snRNA biogenesis. It is known as a small nucleolar RNA (snoRNA) and also often referred to as a "guide" RNA.

U98 belongs to the H/ACA box class of snoRNAs which are thought to guide the sites of modification of uridines to pseudouridines, the target for this family is unknown. The mouse homologue was cloned and is called MBII-367.
