= 23S rRNA pseudouridine746 synthase =

Enzyme

23S rRNA pseudouridine^{746} synthase

Identifiers
- EC no.: 5.4.99.29

Databases
- IntEnz: IntEnz view
- BRENDA: BRENDA entry
- ExPASy: NiceZyme view
- KEGG: KEGG entry
- MetaCyc: metabolic pathway
- PRIAM: profile
- PDB structures: RCSB PDB PDBe PDBsum
Search
- PMC: articles
- PubMed: articles
- NCBI: proteins

23S rRNA pseudouridine^{746} synthase (EC 5.4.99.29, RluA, 23S RNA PSI^{746} synthase, 23S rRNA pseudouridine synthase, pseudouridine synthase RluA) is an enzyme with systematic name 23S rRNA-uridine^{746} uracil mutase. This enzyme catalyses the following chemical reaction

23S rRNA uridine^{746} $\rightleftharpoons$ 23S rRNA pseudouridine^{746}

RluA is the only protein responsible for the in vivo formation of 23S RNA pseudouridine^{746}.

== See also ==
- 23S rRNA
