= TRNA pseudouridine32 synthase =

tRNA pseudouridine^{32} synthase

Identifiers
- EC no.: 5.4.99.28
- CAS no.: 430429-15-5

Databases
- IntEnz: IntEnz view
- BRENDA: BRENDA entry
- ExPASy: NiceZyme view
- KEGG: KEGG entry
- MetaCyc: metabolic pathway
- PRIAM: profile
- PDB structures: RCSB PDB PDBe PDBsum
Search
- PMC: articles
- PubMed: articles
- NCBI: proteins

tRNA pseudouridine^{32} synthase (EC 5.4.99.28, RluA, pseudouridine synthase RluA, Pus9p, Rib2/Pus8p) is an enzyme with systematic name tRNA-uridine^{32} uracil mutase. This enzyme catalyses the following chemical reaction

tRNA uridine^{32} $\rightleftharpoons$ tRNA pseudouridine^{32}

The dual enzyme from Escherichia coli also catalyses the formation of pseudouridine^{746} in 23S rRNA.
