= Uridine =

One of the five major nucleosides in nucleic acids

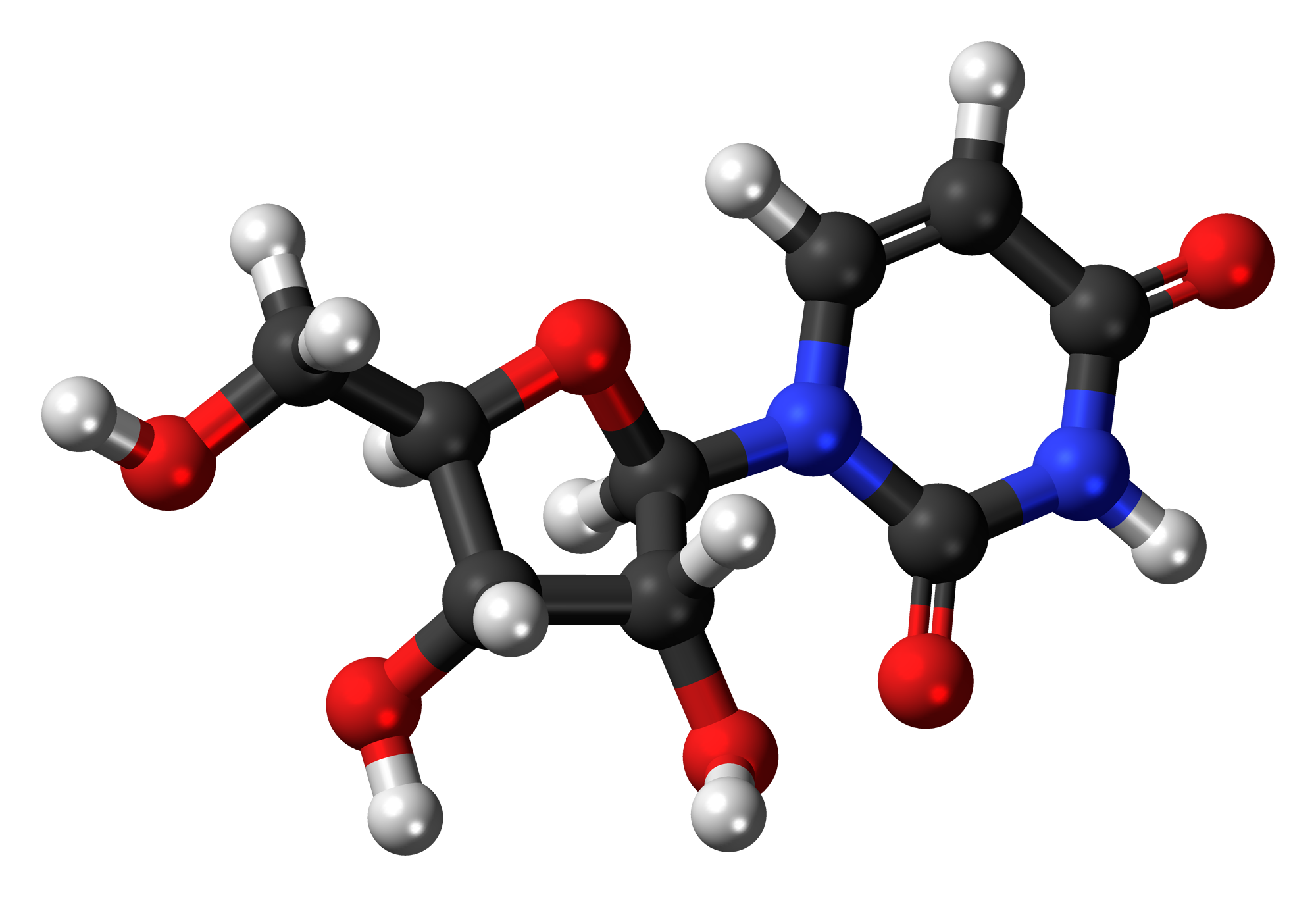

Names
- IUPAC name Uridine
- Systematic IUPAC name 1-[(2R,3R,4S,5R)-3,4-Dihydroxy-5-(hydroxymethyl)oxolan-2-yl]pyrimidine-2,4(1H,3H)-dione

Identifiers
CAS Number	58-96-8
3D model (JSmol)	Interactive image
ChEMBL	ChEMBL100259
ChemSpider	5807
DrugBank	DB02745
ECHA InfoCard	100.000.370
IUPHAR/BPS	4566
MeSH	Uridine
PubChem CID	6029
UNII	WHI7HQ7H85
CompTox Dashboard (EPA)	DTXSID40891555
- InChI: InChI=1S/C9H12N2O6/c12-3-4-6(14)7(15)8(17-4)11-2-1-5(13)10-9(11)16/h1-2,4,6-8,12,14-15H,3H2,(H,10,13,16)/t4-,6-,7-,8-/m1/s1 Key: DRTQHJPVMGBUCF-XVFCMESISA-N; InChI=1/C9H12N2O6/c12-3-4-6(14)7(15)8(17-4)11-2-1-5(13)10-9(11)16/h1-2,4,6-8,12,14-15H,3H2,(H,10,13,16)/t4-,6-,7-,8-/m1/s1 Key: DRTQHJPVMGBUCF-XVFCMESIBG
- SMILES: O=C1NC(=O)N(C=C1)[C@@H]2O[C@H](CO)[C@@H](O)[C@H]2O

Properties
Chemical formula	C_{9}H_{12}N_{2}O_{6}
Molar mass	244.20
Appearance	solid
Density	0.99308g/cm^{3}
Melting point	167.2 °C (333.0 °F; 440.3 K)
log P	−1.98
- Except where otherwise noted, data are given for materials in their standard state (at 25 °C [77 °F], 100 kPa). verify (what is ?) Infobox references

Uridine (symbol U or Urd) is a glycosylated pyrimidine analog containing uracil attached to a ribose ring (or more specifically, a ribofuranose) via a β-N_{1}-glycosidic bond. The analog is one of the five standard nucleosides which make up nucleic acids, the others being adenosine, thymidine, cytidine and guanosine. The five nucleosides are commonly abbreviated to their symbols, U, A, dT, C, and G, respectively. However, thymidine is more commonly written as 'dT' ('d' represents 'deoxy') as it contains a 2'-deoxyribofuranose moiety rather than the ribofuranose ring found in uridine. This is because thymidine is found in deoxyribonucleic acid (DNA) and usually not in ribonucleic acid (RNA). Conversely, uridine is found in RNA and not DNA. The remaining three nucleosides may be found in both RNA and DNA. In RNA, they would be represented as A, C and G whereas in DNA they would be represented as dA, dC and dG.

== Biosynthesis ==
Uridine is widely produced in nature as uridine monophosphate (uridylate) by de novo synthesis by the decarboxylation of orotidylate, which is catalyzed by orotidylate decarboxylase. The orotidylate is produced from orotate, which is combined with 5-phosphoribosyl-1-pyrophosphate (PRPP) to form orotidylate by pyrimidine phosphoribosyltransferase. PRPP is created from ribose-5-phosphate by a further phosphorylation, serving as an energetic molecule to drive the reaction forward, while orotate is generated in several steps from carbamoyl phosphate and aspartate.

== Dietary sources ==
Uridine is regarded as a non-essential nutrient, as it is produced by the human body as needed and supplementation is not generally recommended, though it has been explored for specific applications.

Some foods that contain uridine in the form of RNA are listed below. Although claimed that virtually none of the uridine in this form is bioavailable "since – as shown by Handschumacher's Laboratory at Yale School of Medicine in 1981 – it is destroyed in the liver and gastrointestinal tract, and no food, when consumed, has ever been reliably shown to elevate blood uridine levels'. This is contradicted by Yamamoto et al., plasma uridine levels rose 1.8-fold 30 minutes after beer ingestion, suggesting, at the very least, conflicting data. On the other hand, ethanol on its own (which is present in beer) increases uridine levels, which may explain the raise of uridine levels in the study by Yamamoto et al. In infants consuming mother's milk or commercial infant formulas, uridine is present as its monophosphate, UMP, which is both bioavailable and able to enter the circulation from the digestive tract.

- goat's and sheep's milk and milk products
- Sugarcane extract
- Tomatoes (0.5 to 1.0 g uridine per kilogram dry weight)
- Brewer's yeast (1.7% uridine by dry weight)
- Beer
- Broccoli
- Organ meats (liver, pancreas, etc.)

Consumption of RNA-rich foods may lead to high levels of purines (adenine and guanosine) in blood. High levels of purines are known to increase uric acid production and may aggravate or lead to conditions such as gout.

Harvard researchers report that omega-3 fatty acids and uridine, two substances in foods such as fish, walnuts, molasses, and sugar beets, prevented depression in rats as effectively as antidepressant drugs. "Giving rats a combination of uridine and omega-3 fatty acids produced immediate effects that were indistinguishable from those caused by giving the rats standard antidepressant medications," said lead author of the study William Carlezon, director of McLean's Behavioral Genetics Laboratory.

== Galactose glycolysis ==
Uridine plays a role in the glycolysis pathway of galactose. There is no catabolic process to metabolize galactose. Therefore, galactose is converted to glucose and metabolized in the common glucose pathway. Once the incoming galactose has been converted into galactose 1-phosphate (Gal-1-P), it is involved in a reaction with UDP-glucose, a glucose molecule bonded to uridine diphosphate (UDP). This process is catalyzed by the enzyme galactose-1-phosphate uridylyltransferase and transfers the UDP to the galactose molecule. The end result is UDP-galactose and glucose-1-phosphate. This process is continued to allow the proper glycolysis of galactose.

== See also ==
- Deoxyuridine monophosphate
- Pseudouridine
- Uridine monophosphate
