= Eligminae =

Scientific classification
- Kingdom: Animalia
- Phylum: Arthropoda
- Clade: Pancrustacea
- Class: Insecta
- Order: Lepidoptera
- Superfamily: Noctuoidea
- Family: Nolidae
- Subfamily: Eligminae

Genera
- See text

Subfamily of moths

Eligminae is a subfamily of the moth family Nolidae.

== Genus and species ==
- Eligma Hübner, 1819
  - Eligma allaudi Pinhey, 1968
  - Eligma bettiana Prout, 1923
  - Eligma duplicata Aurivillius, 1892
  - Eligma hypsoides Walker, 1869
  - Eligma laetipicta Oberthür, 1893
  - Eligma malgassica Rothschild, 1896
  - Eligma narcissus Cramer, 1775
  - Eligma neumanni Rothschild, 1925
  - Eligma orthoxantha Lower, 1903
- Gadirtha Walker, [1858]
  - Gadirtha fusca Pogue, 2014
  - Gadirtha impingens Walker, [1858]
  - Gadirtha inexacta Walker, [1858]
  - Gadirtha pulchra Butler, 1886
