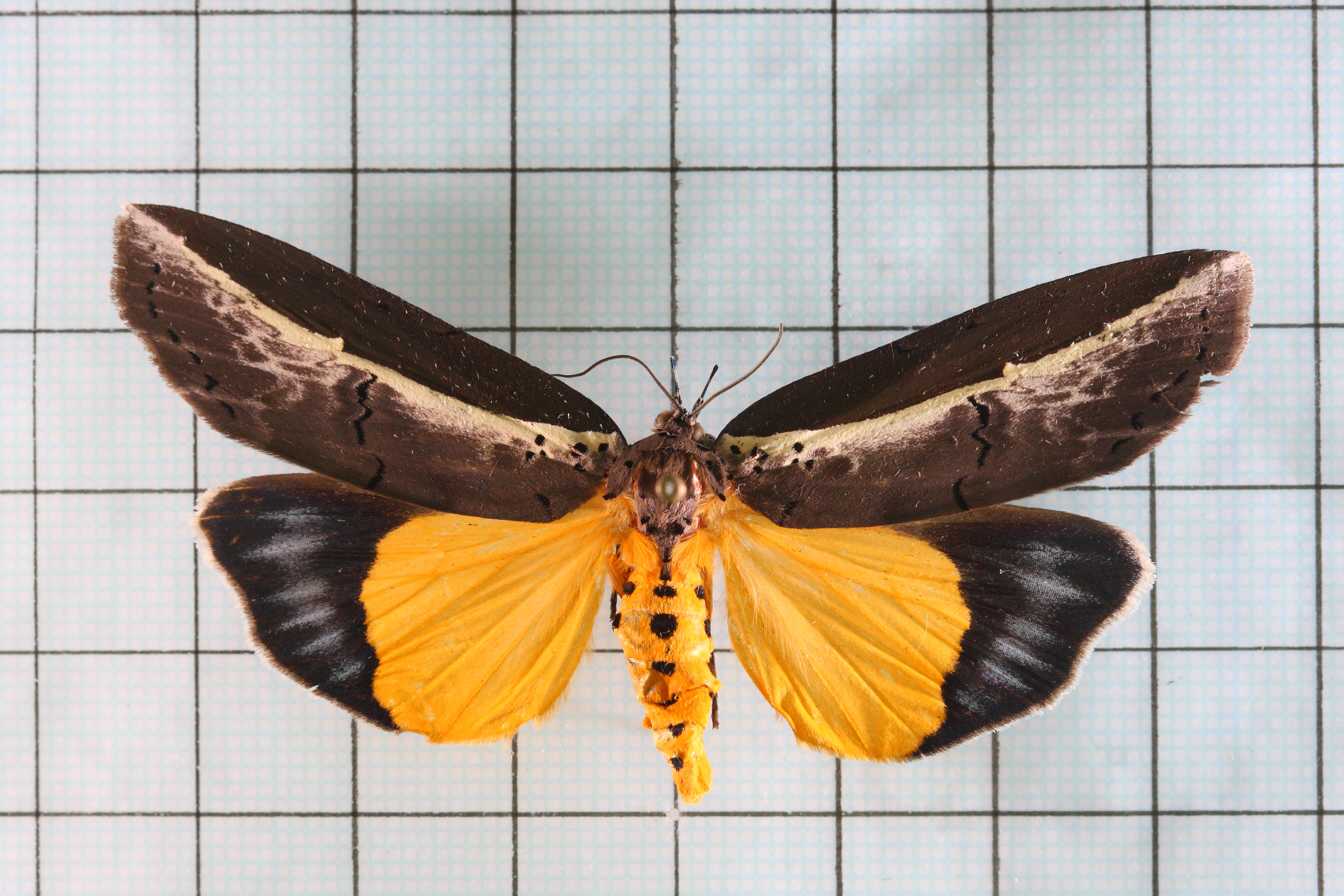

Scientific classification
- Kingdom: Animalia
- Phylum: Arthropoda
- Clade: Pancrustacea
- Class: Insecta
- Order: Lepidoptera
- Superfamily: Noctuoidea
- Family: Nolidae
- Genus: Eligma
- Species: E. narcissus

Binomial name
- Eligma narcissus (Cramer, 1775)

Synonyms
- Phalaena narcissus Cramer, [1775]; Eligma narcissus indica Rothschild, 1896; Eligma narcissus javanica Rothschild, 1896; Eligma narcissus philippinensis Rothschild, 1896; Eligma narcissus celebensis Tams, 1935

= Eligma narcissus =

Ailanthus defoliator

Species of moth

Eligma narcissus, the ailanthus defoliator, is a moth in the family Nolidae. The species was first described by Pieter Cramer in 1775. It is found in tropical Asia and the subtropics of China, India, Sri Lanka, Java and Southeast Islands.

== Description ==
Head and thorax greyish brown and spotted in black. Abdomen bright yellow with dorsal and lateral series of black spots. Forelegs are grey brown and spotted with black. Midlegs and hindlegs are yellowish with black spots on tibia. Tarsi grey brown. Forewings are greyish brown where costal area is with an olive tinge. There is an irregular and diffused curved white fascia from base to apex. Some basal and sub-basal black spots. A waved black line runs from lower angle of cell to inner margin. A submarginal series of black spots, those towards outer angle conjoined into streaks. Hindwings are bright yellow. Apical area is black, suffused or streaked with dark blue, and terminating at vein 1b. Cilia whitish at tips.

== Ecology ==
The larvae feed on Canarium and Ailanthus species, including A. fordii. They are also found to feed on Ailanthus altissima, Amygdalus persica, and Toona sinensis from China.

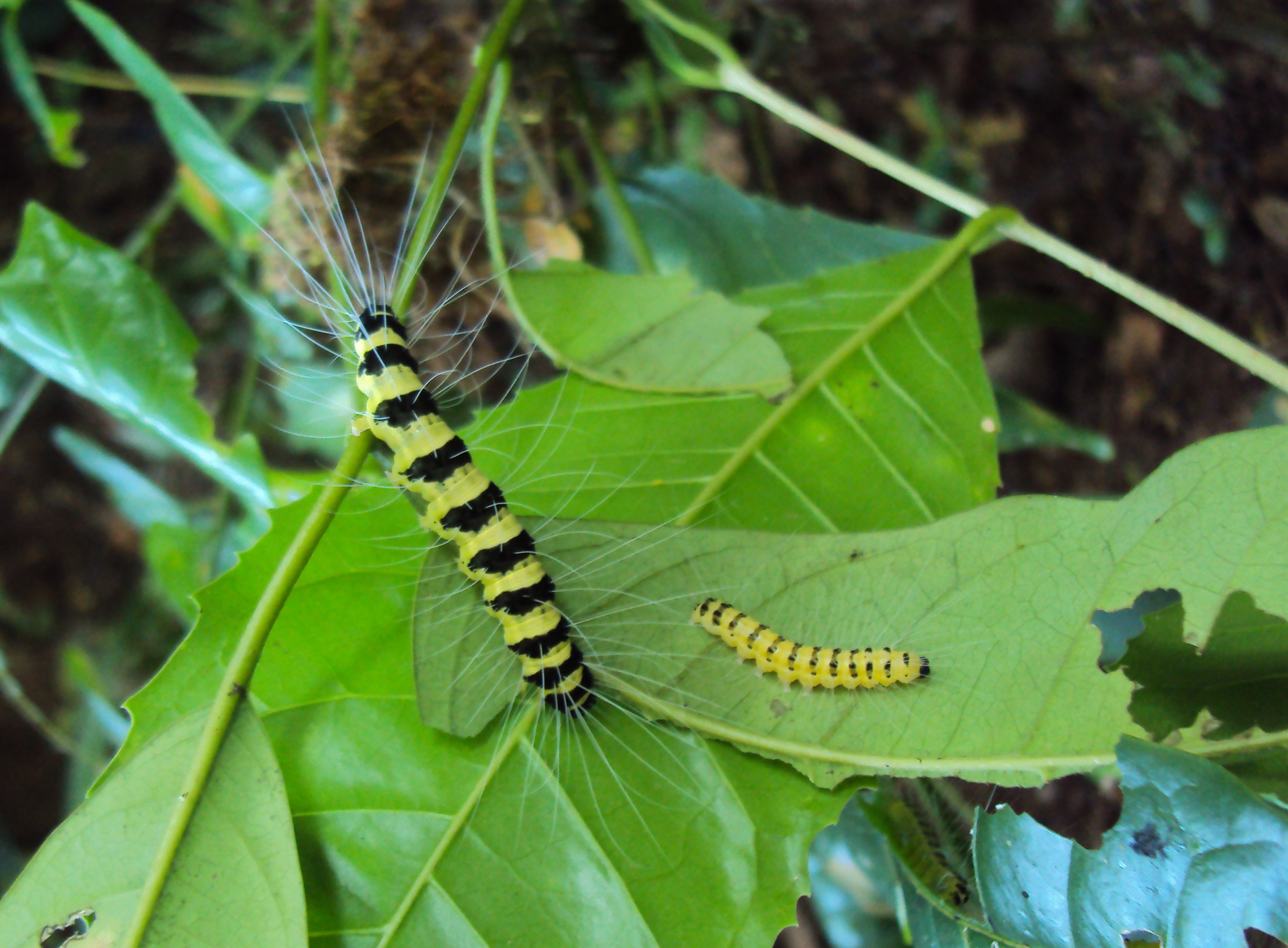
Ailanthus triphysa leaves with larva of Eligma narcissus

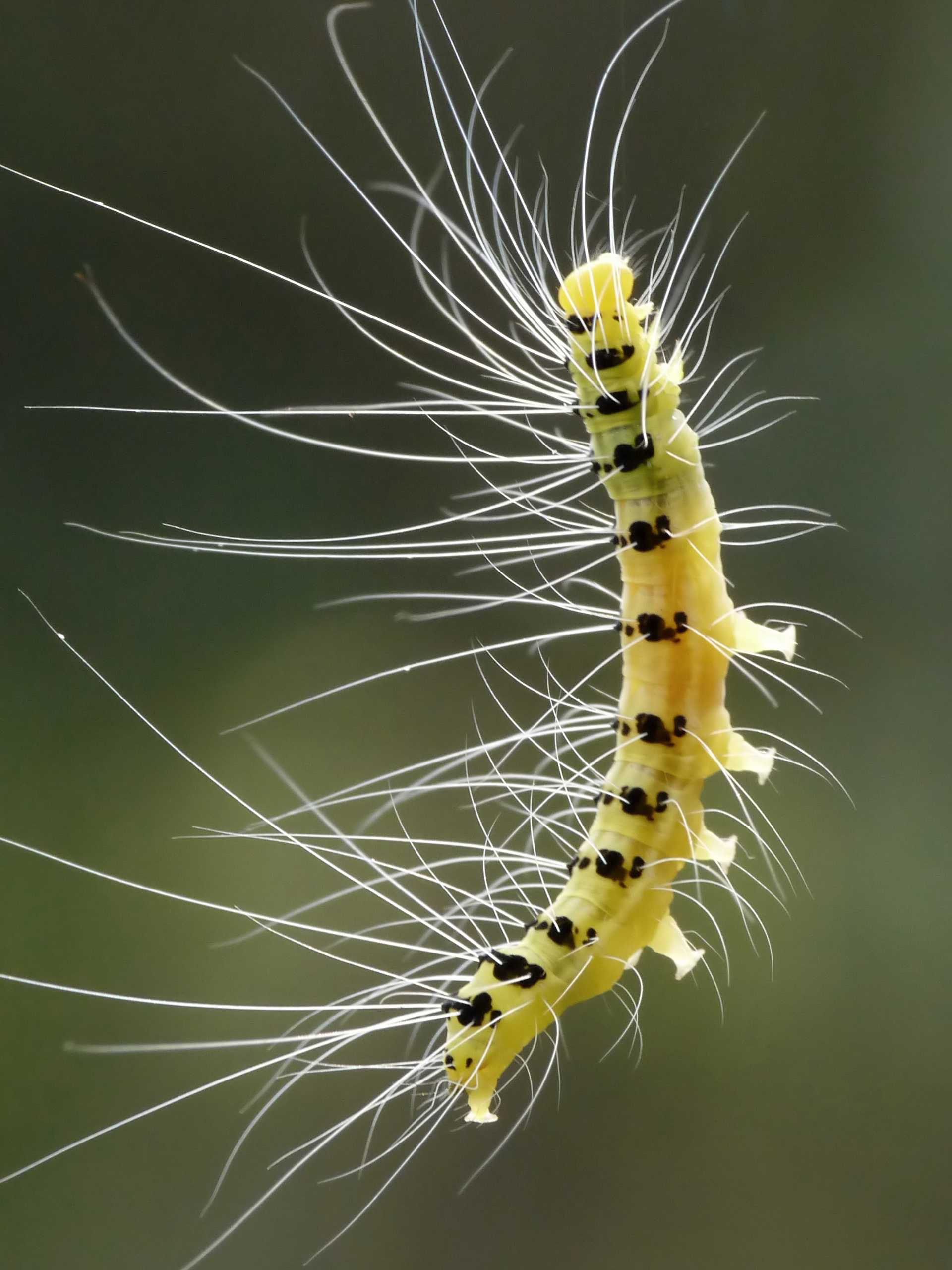
Larva hanging on silk from Ailanthus triphysa
