= Bruceanol D =

Names
- IUPAC name Methyl 15β-{[(2E)-3,4-dimethylpent-2-enoyl]oxy}-1β,11β,12α-trihydroxy-2,16-dioxo-13,20-epoxypicras-3-en-21-oate
- Systematic IUPAC name Methyl (1R,2S,3S,3aS,3a^{1}R,4R,6aR,7aS,11S,11aS,11bR)-4-{[(2E)-3,4-dimethylpent-2-enoyl]oxy}-1,2,11-trihydroxy-8,11a-dimethyl-5,10-dioxo-1,4,5,6a,7,7a,10,11,11a,11b-decahydro-2H-3a^{1},3-(epoxymethano)phenanthro[10,1-bc]pyran-3(3aH)-carboxylate

Identifiers
CAS Number	152645-84-6
3D model (JSmol)	Interactive image
ChEBI	CHEBI:65526
ChemSpider	28540459
PubChem CID	70697724
- InChI: InChI=1S/C28H36O11/c1-11(2)12(3)8-17(30)39-19-21-27-10-37-28(21,25(35)36-6)23(33)18(31)20(27)26(5)14(9-16(27)38-24(19)34)13(4)7-15(29)22(26)32/h7-8,11,14,16,18-23,31-33H,9-10H2,1-6H3/b12-8+/t14-,16+,18+,19+,20+,21+,22+,23-,26-,27+,28-/m0/s1 Key: BOUBPFYATGCWDW-UENHEUQBSA-N; InChI=1S/C28H36O11/c1-11(2)12(3)8-17(30)39-19-21-27-10-37-28(21,25(35)36-6)23(33)18(31)20(27)26(5)14(9-16(27)38-24(19)34)13(4)7-15(29)22(26)32/h7-8,11,14,16,18-23,31-33H,9-10H2,1-6H3/b12-8+/t14-,16+,18+,19+,20+,21+,22+,23-,26-,27+,28-/m0/s1 Key: BOUBPFYATGCWDW-UENHEUQBSA-N
- SMILES: CC1=CC(=O)C(C2(C1CC3C45C2C(C(C(C4C(C(=O)O3)OC(=O)C=C(C)C(C)C)(OC5)C(=O)OC)O)O)C)O

Properties
Chemical formula	C_{28}H_{36}O_{11}
Molar mass	548.585 g·mol^{−1}
- Except where otherwise noted, data are given for materials in their standard state (at 25 °C [77 °F], 100 kPa). Infobox references

Bruceanol D is a cytotoxic quassinoid isolated from Brucea antidysenterica with potential antitumor and antileukemic properties.

== See also ==
- Bruceanol
