= Bruceanol E =

Names
- IUPAC name Methyl (1β,11β,12α,15β)-15-{[(2E)-3,4-dimethyl-2-pentenoyl]oxy}-1,11,12-trihydroxy-2,16-dioxo-13,20-epoxypicrasan-21-oate

Identifiers
CAS Number	152645-85-7
3D model (JSmol)	Interactive image
ChEBI	CHEBI:65527
ChemSpider	34999262
PubChem CID	91666325
UNII	SY8GAZ4AAB
- InChI: InChI=1S/C28H38O11/c1-11(2)12(3)8-17(30)39-19-21-27-10-37-28(21,25(35)36-6)23(33)18(31)20(27)26(5)14(9-16(27)38-24(19)34)13(4)7-15(29)22(26)32/h8,11,13-14,16,18-23,31-33H,7,9-10H2,1-6H3/b12-8+/t13-,14+,16-,18-,19-,20-,21-,22-,23+,26+,27-,28+/m1/s1 Key: SXRILXHNZYONKW-XZXXSJTKSA-N; InChI=1S/C28H38O11/c1-11(2)12(3)8-17(30)39-19-21-27-10-37-28(21,25(35)36-6)23(33)18(31)20(27)26(5)14(9-16(27)38-24(19)34)13(4)7-15(29)22(26)32/h8,11,13-14,16,18-23,31-33H,7,9-10H2,1-6H3/b12-8+/t13-,14+,16-,18-,19-,20-,21-,22-,23+,26+,27-,28+/m1/s1 Key: SXRILXHNZYONKW-XZXXSJTKSA-N
- SMILES: CC1CC(=O)C(C2(C1CC3C45C2C(C(C(C4C(C(=O)O3)OC(=O)C=C(C)C(C)C)(OC5)C(=O)OC)O)O)C)O

Properties
Chemical formula	C_{28}H_{38}O_{11}
Molar mass	550.601 g·mol^{−1}
- Except where otherwise noted, data are given for materials in their standard state (at 25 °C [77 °F], 100 kPa). Infobox references

Bruceanol E is a cytotoxic quassinoid isolated from Brucea antidysenterica with potential antitumor and antileukemic properties.

== See also ==
- Bruceanol
