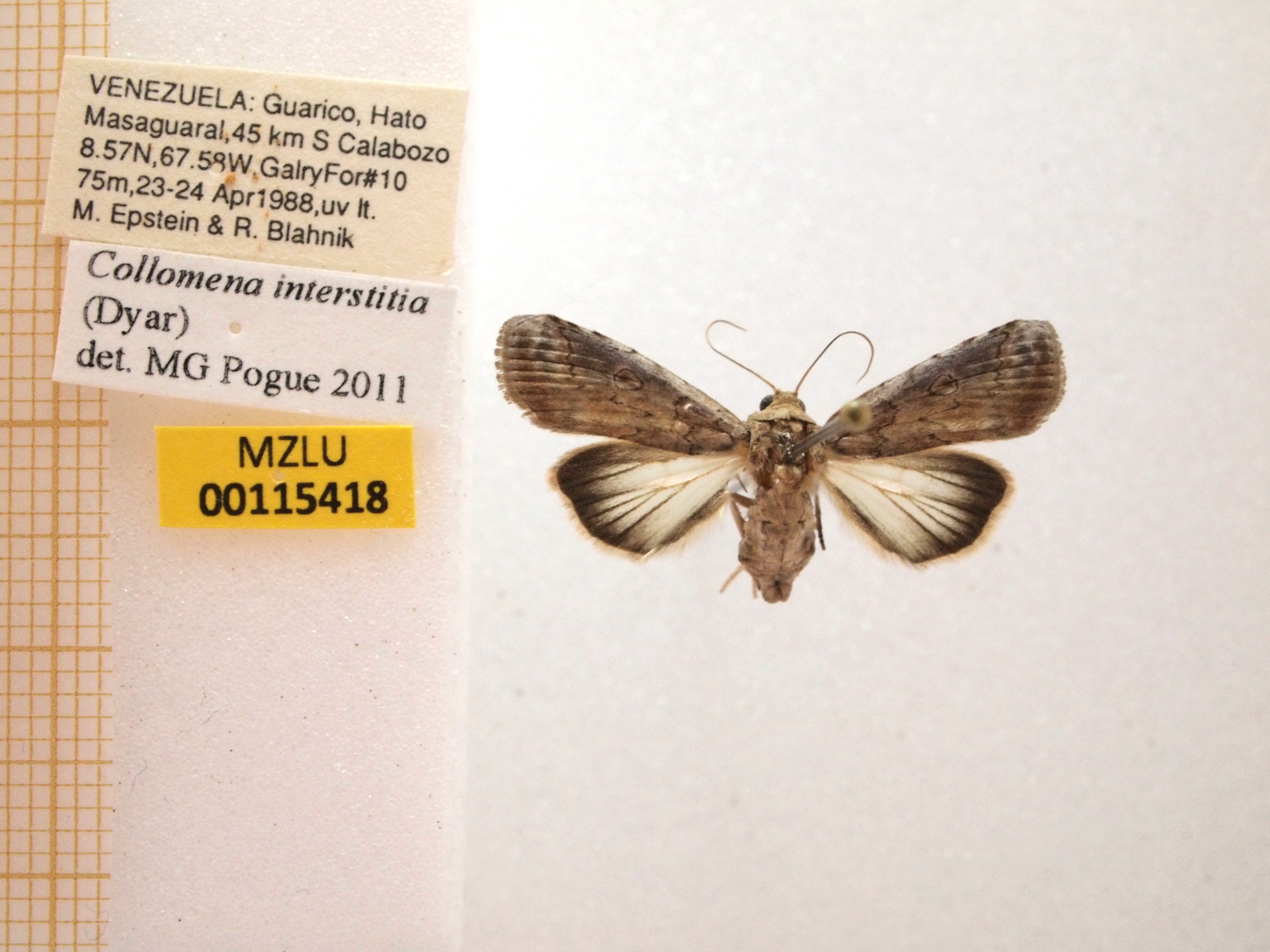

Scientific classification
- Domain: Eukaryota
- Kingdom: Animalia
- Phylum: Arthropoda
- Class: Insecta
- Order: Lepidoptera
- Superfamily: Noctuoidea
- Family: Nolidae
- Subfamily: Collomeninae
- Genus: Collomena; Möschler, 1890

= Collomena =

Genus of moths

Collomena is a genus of moths of the family Nolidae described by Heinrich Benno Möschler in 1890. The Global Lepidoptera Names Index lists it as a synonym of Motya, but other databases such as Lepidoptera and Some Other Life Forms and Butterflies and Moths of the World list it as valid.

== Species ==
- Collomena chirica (Schaus, 1906) Mexico
- Collomena filifera (Walker, 1857) Antilles to Brazil
- Collomena fugax (Dyar, 1914) Panama
- Collomena haematopis (Hampson, 1912) Argentina (Tucuman)
- Collomena illegitima (Dyar, 1914) Panama
- Collomena inflexa (Morrison, 1875) Florida
- Collomena interstitia (Dyar, 1914) Panama, Costa Rica
- Collomena leucopis (Schaus, 1910) Costa Rica
- Collomena metaphaea (Hampson, 1912) Panama
- Collomena murora (Dyar, 1914) Panama
- Collomena olivaris (Dyar, 1912) Mexico
- Collomena siopera (Dyar, 1914) Panama, Mexico
