= Bruceanol H =

Names
- IUPAC name Methyl 15β-{[(2E)-3,4-dimethylpent-2-enoyl]oxy}-2α,11β,12α-trihydroxy-1,16-dioxo-13,20-epoxy-13β-picrasan-21-oate
- Systematic IUPAC name Methyl (1R,2S,3S,3aS,3a^{1}R,4R,6aR,7aS,8R,10S,11aS,11bS)-4-{[(2E)-3,4-dimethylpent-2-enoyl]oxy}-1,2,10-trihydroxy-8,11a-dimethyl-5,11-dioxododecahydro-2H-3,4a^{1}-(epoxymethano)phenanthro[10,1-bc]furan-3(3aH)-carboxylate
- Other names Methyl (2α,11β,12α,13β,15β)-15-{[(2E)-3,4-dimethyl-2-pentenoyl]oxy}-2,11,12-trihydroxy-1,16-dioxo-13,20-epoxypicrasan-21-oate

Identifiers
3D model (JSmol)	Interactive image
ChEMBL	ChEMBL507455
ChemSpider	8920578
PubChem CID	10745249
- InChI: InChI=1S/C28H38O11/c1-11(2)12(3)8-17(30)39-19-21-27-10-37-28(21,25(35)36-6)23(33)18(31)20(27)26(5)14(9-16(27)38-24(19)34)13(4)7-15(29)22(26)32/h8,11,13-16,18-21,23,29,31,33H,7,9-10H2,1-6H3/b12-8+/t13-,14+,15+,16-,18-,19-,20-,21-,23+,26+,27-,28+/m1/s1 Key: OFEQMSZQMBVXLR-BWLCXNNMSA-N; InChI=1S/C28H38O11/c1-11(2)12(3)8-17(30)39-19-21-27-10-37-28(21,25(35)36-6)23(33)18(31)20(27)26(5)14(9-16(27)38-24(19)34)13(4)7-15(29)22(26)32/h8,11,13-16,18-21,23,29,31,33H,7,9-10H2,1-6H3/b12-8+/t13-,14+,15+,16-,18-,19-,20-,21-,23+,26+,27-,28+/m1/s1 Key: OFEQMSZQMBVXLR-BWLCXNNMSA-N
- SMILES: C[C@@H]1C[C@@H](C(=O)[C@]2([C@H]1C[C@@H]3[C@]45[C@@H]2[C@H]([C@@H]([C@]([C@@H]4[C@H](C(=O)O3)OC(=O)/C=C(\C)/C(C)C)(OC5)C(=O)OC)O)O)C)O

Properties
Chemical formula	C_{28}H_{38}O_{11}
Molar mass	550.601 g·mol^{−1}
- Except where otherwise noted, data are given for materials in their standard state (at 25 °C [77 °F], 100 kPa). Infobox references

Bruceanol H is a cytotoxic quassinoid isolated from Brucea antidysenterica with potential antitumor and antileukemic properties.

== See also ==
- Bruceanol
