= Bruceanol A =

Names
- IUPAC name Methyl 15-(benzoyloxy)-1,11,12-trihydroxy-2,16-dioxo-13,20-epoxypicras-3-en-21-oate

Identifiers
CAS Number	101391-06-4
3D model (JSmol)	Interactive image
ChEMBL	ChEMBL452982
ChemSpider	113359
PubChem CID	127805
CompTox Dashboard (EPA)	DTXSID50906124
- InChI: InChI=1S/C28H30O11/c1-12-9-15(29)21(31)26(2)14(12)10-16-27-11-37-28(25(35)36-3,22(32)17(30)19(26)27)20(27)18(24(34)38-16)39-23(33)13-7-5-4-6-8-13/h4-9,14,16-22,30-32H,10-11H2,1-3H3/t14-,16+,17+,18+,19+,20+,21+,22-,26-,27?,28+/m0/s1 Key: QSNVEJIGBNLCQI-KMRSUJGASA-N; InChI=1S/C28H30O11/c1-12-9-15(29)21(31)26(2)14(12)10-16-27-11-37-28(25(35)36-3,22(32)17(30)19(26)27)20(27)18(24(34)38-16)39-23(33)13-7-5-4-6-8-13/h4-9,14,16-22,30-32H,10-11H2,1-3H3/t14-,16+,17+,18+,19+,20+,21+,22-,26-,27?,28+/m0/s1 Key: QSNVEJIGBNLCQI-KMRSUJGASA-N
- SMILES: CC1=CC(=O)C(C2(C1CC3C45C2C(C(C(C4C(C(=O)O3)OC(=O)C6=CC=CC=C6)(OC5)C(=O)OC)O)O)C)O

Properties
Chemical formula	C_{28}H_{30}O_{11}
Molar mass	542.537 g·mol^{−1}
- Except where otherwise noted, data are given for materials in their standard state (at 25 °C [77 °F], 100 kPa). Infobox references

Bruceanol A is a cytotoxic quassinoid isolated from Brucea antidysenterica with potential antitumor and antileukemic properties.

== See also ==
- Bruceanol
