= Bruceanol F =

Names
- IUPAC name Methyl 15-{[(2E)-3,4-dimethylpent-2-enoyl]oxy}-2,11β,12α-trihydroxy-1,16-dioxo-13,20-epoxy-13β-picras-2-en-21-oate
- Systematic IUPAC name Methyl (1R,2S,3S,3aS,3a^{1}R,4R,6aR,7aS,8S,11aS,11bS)-4-{[(2E)-3,4-dimethylpent-2-enoyl]oxy}-1,2,10-trihydroxy-5,11-dioxo-8,11a-dimethyl-1,3,3a,4,5,6a,7,7a,10,11,11a,11b-dodecahydro-2H-3,3a^{1}-(epoxymethano)phenanthro[10,1-bc]pyran-3-carboxylate

Identifiers
CAS Number	101910-72-9
3D model (JSmol)	Interactive image
ChEBI	CHEBI:65528
ChEMBL	ChEMBL504514
ChemSpider	4943354
PubChem CID	6438914
CompTox Dashboard (EPA)	DTXSID501100949
- InChI: InChI=1S/C28H36O11/c1-11(2)12(3)8-17(30)39-19-21-27-10-37-28(21,25(35)36-6)23(33)18(31)20(27)26(5)14(9-16(27)38-24(19)34)13(4)7-15(29)22(26)32/h7-8,11,13-14,16,18-21,23,29,31,33H,9-10H2,1-6H3/b12-8+/t13-,14+,16-,18-,19-,20-,21-,23+,26+,27-,28+/m1/s1 Key: PCKQDAAUYVCTJJ-XYGKKIDYSA-N; InChI=1S/C28H36O11/c1-11(2)12(3)8-17(30)39-19-21-27-10-37-28(21,25(35)36-6)23(33)18(31)20(27)26(5)14(9-16(27)38-24(19)34)13(4)7-15(29)22(26)32/h7-8,11,13-14,16,18-21,23,29,31,33H,9-10H2,1-6H3/b12-8+/t13-,14+,16-,18-,19-,20-,21-,23+,26+,27-,28+/m1/s1 Key: PCKQDAAUYVCTJJ-XYGKKIDYSA-N
- SMILES: CC1C=C(C(=O)C2(C1CC3C45C2C(C(C(C4C(C(=O)O3)OC(=O)C=C(C)C(C)C)(OC5)C(=O)OC)O)O)C)O

Properties
Chemical formula	C_{28}H_{36}O_{11}
Molar mass	548.585 g·mol^{−1}
- Except where otherwise noted, data are given for materials in their standard state (at 25 °C [77 °F], 100 kPa). Infobox references

Bruceanol F is a cytotoxic quassinoid isolated from Brucea antidysenterica with potential antitumor and antileukemic properties.

== See also ==
- Bruceanol
