= Bruceanol C =

Names
- IUPAC name Methyl (1β,8ξ,11β,12α,15β)-15-[(3E)-5-acetoxy-4,5-dimethyl-2-oxo-3-hexenoyl]-1,11,12-trihydroxy-2,16-dioxo-13,20-epoxypicras-3-en-21-oate

Identifiers
CAS Number	114586-21-9
3D model (JSmol)	Interactive image
ChEMBL	ChEMBL2368536
ChemSpider	4945079
PubChem CID	6440833
CompTox Dashboard (EPA)	DTXSID401336733
- InChI: InChI=1S/C31H38O13/c1-12-8-17(34)24(37)29(6)15(12)10-18-30-11-42-31(27(40)41-7,25(38)21(36)23(29)30)22(30)19(26(39)43-18)20(35)16(33)9-13(2)28(4,5)44-14(3)32/h8-9,15,18-19,21-25,36-38H,10-11H2,1-7H3/b13-9+/t15-,18+,19+,21+,22+,23+,24+,25-,29-,30?,31+/m0/s1 Key: ZIQXGRZNRFCISN-OFGJEKSYSA-N; InChI=1S/C31H38O13/c1-12-8-17(34)24(37)29(6)15(12)10-18-30-11-42-31(27(40)41-7,25(38)21(36)23(29)30)22(30)19(26(39)43-18)20(35)16(33)9-13(2)28(4,5)44-14(3)32/h8-9,15,18-19,21-25,36-38H,10-11H2,1-7H3/b13-9+/t15-,18+,19+,21+,22+,23+,24+,25-,29-,30?,31+/m0/s1 Key: ZIQXGRZNRFCISN-OFGJEKSYSA-N
- SMILES: CC1=CC(=O)[C@H]([C@]2([C@H]1C[C@@H]3C45[C@@H]2[C@H]([C@@H]([C@@]([C@@H]4[C@H](C(=O)O3)C(=O)C(=O)/C=C(\C)/C(C)(C)OC(=O)C)(OC5)C(=O)OC)O)O)C)O

Properties
Chemical formula	C_{31}H_{38}O_{13}
Molar mass	618.632 g·mol^{−1}
- Except where otherwise noted, data are given for materials in their standard state (at 25 °C [77 °F], 100 kPa). Infobox references

Bruceanol C is a cytotoxic quassinoid isolated from Brucea antidysenterica with potential antitumor and antileukemic properties.

== See also ==
- Bruceanol
