= Bruceanol B =

Names
- IUPAC name Methyl (1β,8ξ,11β,12α,15β)-15-(hexanoyloxy)-1,11,12-trihydroxy-2,16-dioxo-13,20-epoxypicras-3-en-21-oate

Identifiers
CAS Number	101391-06-4
3D model (JSmol)	Interactive image
ChEMBL	ChEMBL449556
ChemSpider	113358
PubChem CID	127804
CompTox Dashboard (EPA)	DTXSID90906123
- InChI: InChI=1S/C27H36O11/c1-5-6-7-8-16(29)38-18-20-26-11-36-27(20,24(34)35-4)22(32)17(30)19(26)25(3)13(10-15(26)37-23(18)33)12(2)9-14(28)21(25)31/h9,13,15,17-22,30-32H,5-8,10-11H2,1-4H3/t13-,15+,17+,18+,19+,20+,21+,22-,25-,26?,27+/m0/s1 Key: NZDAVMOPAYYVCK-FIUJHEBUSA-N; InChI=1S/C27H36O11/c1-5-6-7-8-16(29)38-18-20-26-11-36-27(20,24(34)35-4)22(32)17(30)19(26)25(3)13(10-15(26)37-23(18)33)12(2)9-14(28)21(25)31/h9,13,15,17-22,30-32H,5-8,10-11H2,1-4H3/t13-,15+,17+,18+,19+,20+,21+,22-,25-,26?,27+/m0/s1 Key: NZDAVMOPAYYVCK-FIUJHEBUSA-N
- SMILES: CC1=CC(=O)C(C2(C1CC3C45C2C(C(C(C4C(C(=O)O3)OC(=O)C6=CC=CC=C6)(OC5)C(=O)OC)O)O)C)O

Properties
Chemical formula	C_{27}H_{36}O_{11}
Molar mass	536.574 g·mol^{−1}
- Except where otherwise noted, data are given for materials in their standard state (at 25 °C [77 °F], 100 kPa). Infobox references

Bruceanol B is a cytotoxic quassinoid isolated from Brucea antidysenterica with potential antitumor and antileukemic properties.

== See also ==
- Bruceanol
