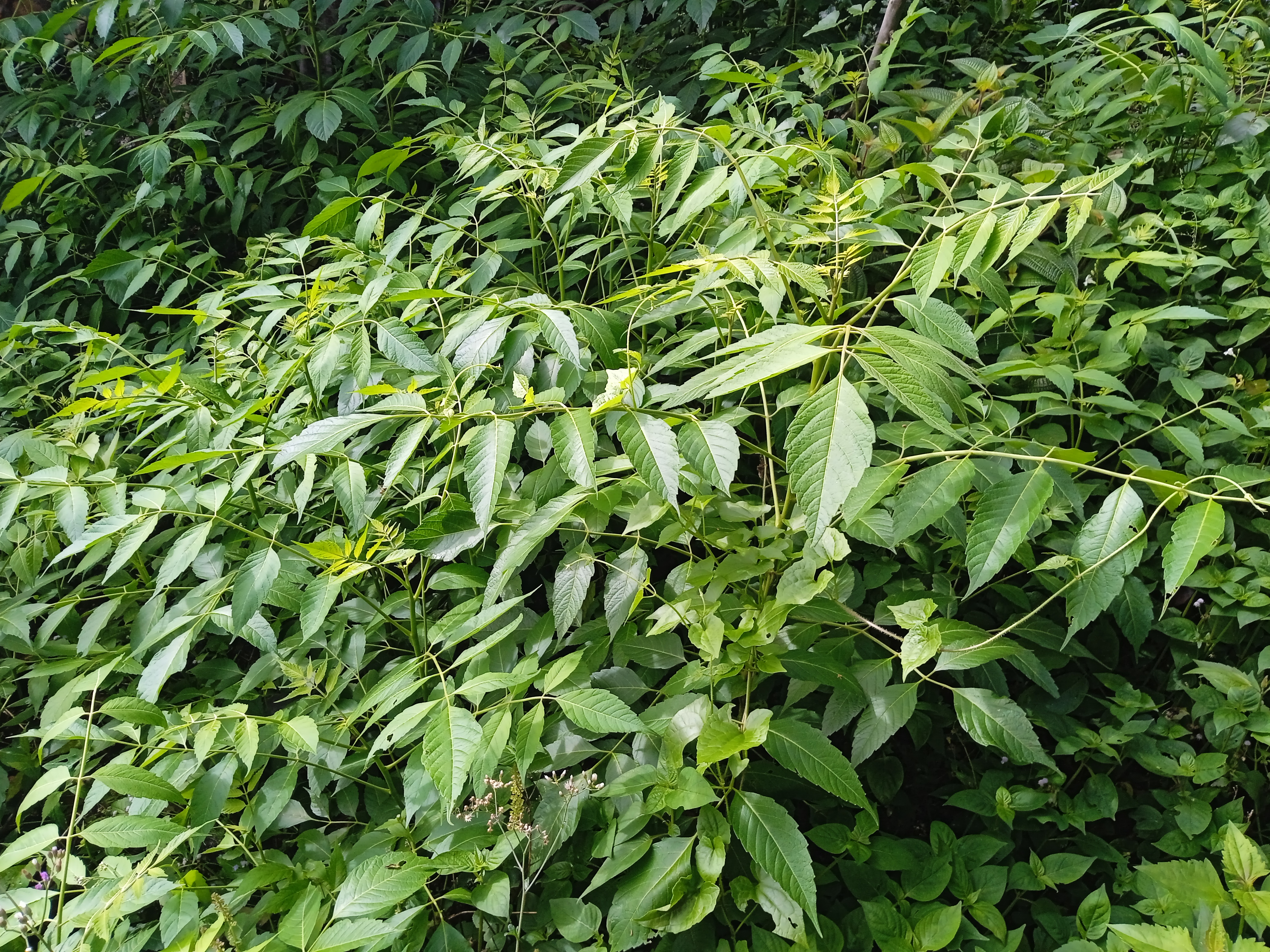

Conservation status
- Least Concern (IUCN 3.1)

Scientific classification
- Kingdom: Plantae
- Clade: Tracheophytes
- Clade: Angiosperms
- Clade: Eudicots
- Clade: Rosids
- Order: Sapindales
- Family: Simaroubaceae
- Genus: Brucea
- Species: B. javanica

Binomial name
- Brucea javanica (L.) Merr.

Synonyms
- Ailanthus gracilis Salisb.; Brucea amarissima Desv. ex Gomes; Brucea glabrata Decne.; Brucea gracilis (Salisb.) DC.; Brucea sumatrana Roxb.; Brucea sumatrensis Spreng.; Gonus amarissimus Lour.; Rhus javanica L.

= Brucea javanica =

Species of plant

Brucea javanica, commonly known as the Macassar kernels, is a plant in the family Simaroubaceae. The specific epithet javanica is from Latin, meaning "of Java". Other common names in English include Java brucea and kosam.

== Description ==
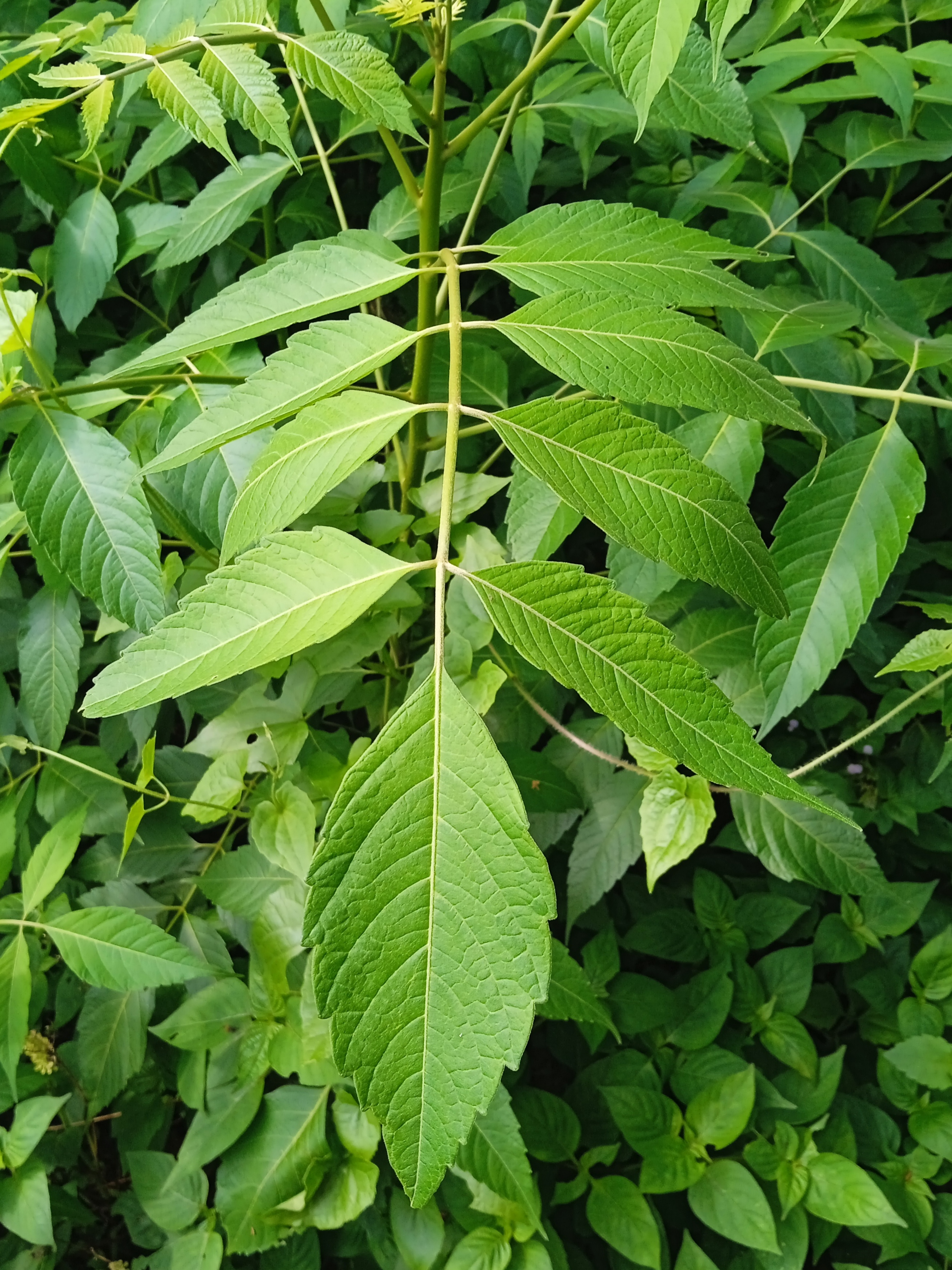
B. javanica leaves

Brucea javanica grows as a shrub or small tree to 5 metres (16 ft) tall. The tiny flowers (1.5–2 mm in diameter) are greenish white to greenish red or purple and occur in panicles. There are separate male and female flowers on each plant, making it a monoecious species. The anthers are typically red. In the northern hemisphere it flowers in June and July and sets fruit in July and August, in Australia it flowers from October to February and fruits from February to July. The fruit, which are drupes, measure up to 0.5 cm (0.2 in) long. When ripe they are a black-gray color and they become wrinkled when dry. The seed is whitish yellow and covered with an oily membrane. It has compound leaves with typically 7–9 (but range from 3–15) ovate to ovate-lanceolate leaflets with serrate margins. Each leaflet is 20–40 cm long at maturity and comes to a point at the apex. The leaves are covered with fine hairs that are most prominent on the veins and on the undersides of the leaves. All parts of the plant are intensely bitter.

== Distribution and habitat ==
Brucea javanica occurs naturally from Sri Lanka and India to China, Indochina, Malesia, New Guinea and Australia. Its habitat includes open areas, secondary forest and sometimes sand dunes. In Australia it grows as an understory tree from sea-level to 500 metres (1,600 ft) altitude.

== Bruceolides ==
It contains quassinoid compounds called bruceolides. The plant is used in folk medicine to treat dysentery and malaria.
