= Bruceanol G =

Names
- IUPAC name Methyl 15β-{[(2E)-4-(acetyloxy)-3,4-dimethylpent-2-enoyl]oxy}-1β,11β,12α-trihydroxy-2,16-dioxo-13,20-epoxy-13β-picrasan-21-oate
- Systematic IUPAC name Methyl (1R,2S,3S,3aS,3a^{1}R,4R,6aR,7aS,8R,11S,11aS,11bS)-4-{[(2E)-4-(acetyloxy)-3,4-dimethylpent-2-enoyl]oxy}-1,2,11-trihydroxy-8,11a-dimethyl-5,10-dioxotetradecahydro-2H-3,3a^{1}-(epoxymethano)phenanthro[10,1-bc]pyran-3-carboxylate

Identifiers
CAS Number	168301-20-0
3D model (JSmol)	Interactive image
ChEMBL	ChEMBL445045
ChemSpider	4944877
PubChem CID	6440620
CompTox Dashboard (EPA)	DTXSID101336734
- InChI: InChI=1S/C30H40O13/c1-12-8-16(32)23(35)28(6)15(12)10-17-29-11-40-30(26(38)39-7,24(36)19(34)21(28)29)22(29)20(25(37)41-17)42-18(33)9-13(2)27(4,5)43-14(3)31/h9,12,15,17,19-24,34-36H,8,10-11H2,1-7H3/b13-9+/t12-,15+,17-,19-,20-,21-,22-,23-,24+,28+,29-,30+/m1/s1 Key: LNFLSPAGUXRAML-GLQLFLDVSA-N; InChI=1S/C30H40O13/c1-12-8-16(32)23(35)28(6)15(12)10-17-29-11-40-30(26(38)39-7,24(36)19(34)21(28)29)22(29)20(25(37)41-17)42-18(33)9-13(2)27(4,5)43-14(3)31/h9,12,15,17,19-24,34-36H,8,10-11H2,1-7H3/b13-9+/t12-,15+,17-,19-,20-,21-,22-,23-,24+,28+,29-,30+/m1/s1 Key: LNFLSPAGUXRAML-GLQLFLDVSA-N
- SMILES: C[C@@H]1CC(=O)[C@H]([C@]2([C@H]1C[C@@H]3[C@]45[C@@H]2[C@H]([C@@H]([C@]([C@@H]4[C@H](C(=O)O3)OC(=O)/C=C(\C)/C(C)(C)OC(=O)C)(OC5)C(=O)OC)O)O)C)O

Properties
Chemical formula	C_{30}H_{40}O_{13}
Molar mass	608.637 g·mol^{−1}
- Except where otherwise noted, data are given for materials in their standard state (at 25 °C [77 °F], 100 kPa). Infobox references

Bruceanol G is a cytotoxic quassinoid isolated from Brucea antidysenterica with potential antitumor and kinetic properties.

== See also ==
- Bruceanol
