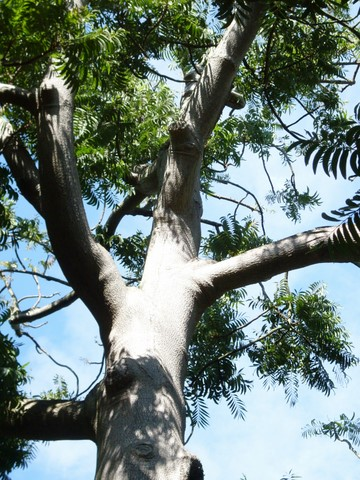

Scientific classification
- Kingdom: Plantae
- Clade: Tracheophytes
- Clade: Angiosperms
- Clade: Eudicots
- Clade: Rosids
- Order: Sapindales
- Family: Simaroubaceae
- Genus: Ailanthus
- Species: A. triphysa

Binomial name
- Ailanthus triphysa (Dennst.) Alston., in Trimen, Hand-Book Fl. Ceylon vi. Suppl., 41 (1931)

Synonyms
- Adenanthera triphysa Dennst.; Ailanthus imberbiflora F.Muell.; A. imberbiflora var. macartneyi F.M.Bailey; A. kurzii Prain; A. malabarica DC.; A. philippinensis Merr.; Hebonga mollis Radlk.; H. obliqua Radlk.; H. siamensis Radlk.; Pongelion fauvelianum (Pierre ex Laness.) Pierre; P. imberbiflorum (F.Muell.) Pierre

= Ailanthus triphysa =

Species of tree

Ailanthus triphysa (also Ailanthus malabarica), ferntop ash, is a medium to tall evergreen rainforest tree that is native to Asia and Australia. The wood is used for matchwood and plywood. The tree is known as halmaddi in India, where its resin, also called halmaddi, may be used in incense. Inappropriate extraction methods were resulting in trees dying, thus by the 1990s the Indian forestry department had banned extraction.

== Distribution ==
Ailanthus triphysa occurs in India, including the Andaman Islands; Sri Lanka; Myanmar; South-Central and Southeast China; Thailand; Laos; Malaysia, including Peninsular Malaysia, Sarawak and Sabah; Cambodia; Vietnam; Philippines; Jawa, Kalimantan, Sulawesi and Maluku in Indonesia; and Australia. In Australia, Ailanthus triphysa occurs as two isolated populations in Western Australia (at Prince Regent River and on the offshore Coronation Island, in the Kimberley), and from Cape York in Queensland and as far south as the Susan Island Nature Reserve at Clarence River (New South Wales).

== Description ==
Ailanthus triphysa is a medium to tall evergreen tree growing up to 30 m and a trunk diameter of 1.2 m. The trunk is not buttressed, but rather straight and cylindrical. The bark is grey, somewhat rough and resembling sandpaper to the touch. The stems are lenticellate; they are blaze yellow with red speckles. The leaves are pinnate, curved and sickle-shaped drawn out to a point and are particularly oblique at the base. Venation is prominent, the net veins more obvious under the leaf. Flowers are creamy green, flowering in November to January in Australia. The fruit is a samara, often forming in threes.

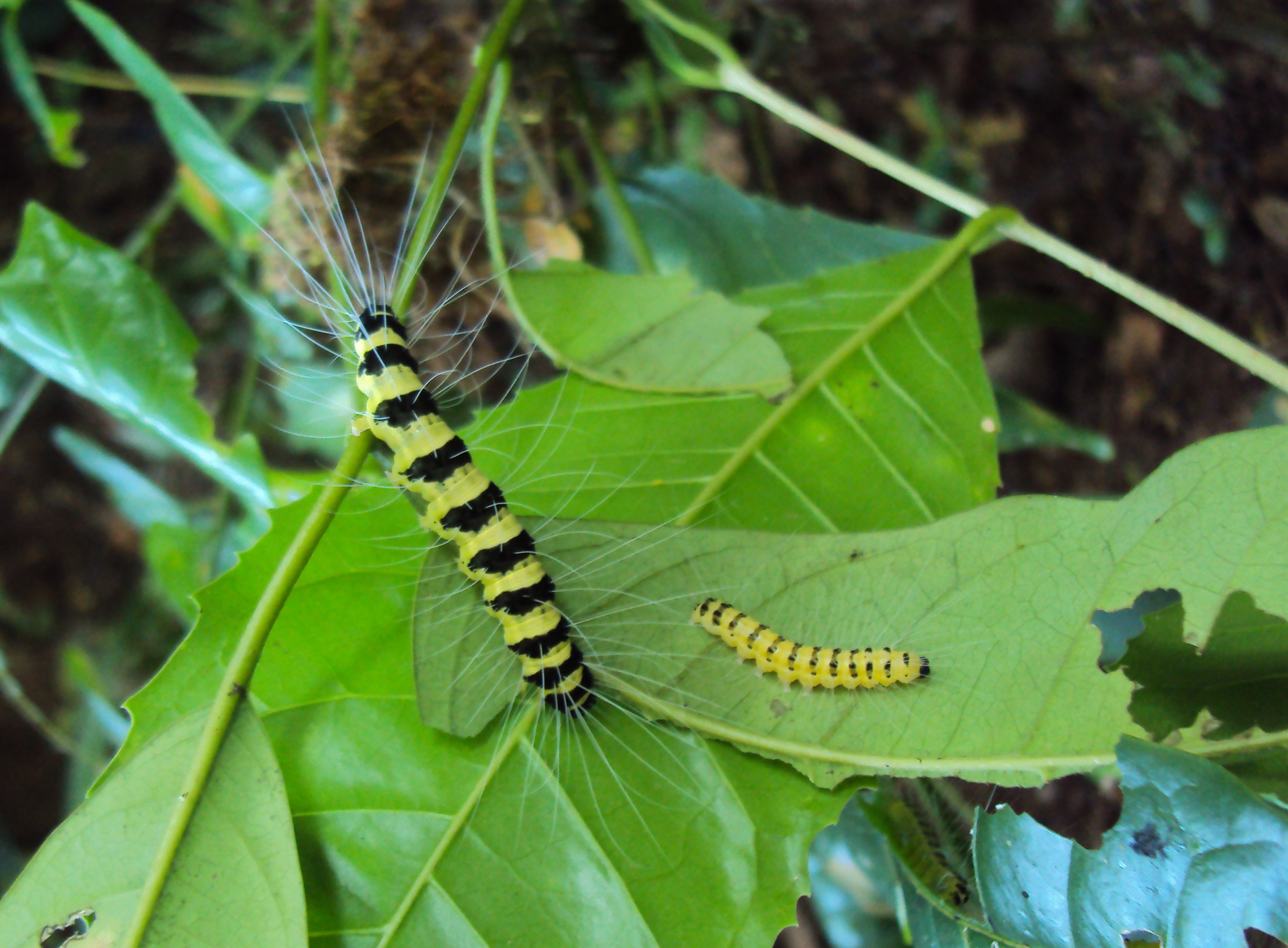
Ailanthus triphysa leaves with larva of Eligma narcissus moth. Young larvae skeletonise leaflets, while older larvae are defoliators.

The leaves bear twigs 1 cm or more in diameter, and the stipules are very small. Leaflet blades are falcate, about 5-12 x 0.9–2 cm, very unequal-sided particularly at the base. The lateral veins form loops well inside the blade margin. The midrib is raised in a depression on the upper surface of the leaflet blade. Numerous, closely spaced oil dots are visible with a lens.

The flowers are polygamous, and are greenish yellow in color. Inflorescence is axillary in a branched panicle, about 10–20 cm long. The sepals are about 0.5-0.8 mm long. The petals are about 3.5-4.5 x 2 mm, the stamens are about 3–4 mm long in male flowers, and carpels are 2-4 mm (usually 3mm) long. Ovules are one per carpel. Flowering season in India is from December to May.

The fruit are green to greenish brown, papery in texture. The samaras are about 5-6 x 1–2 cm. There is a main vascular bundle to the seed connected to an intramarginal vein on the samara.

== Habitat ==
On the island of Yamdena, eastern Indonesia, the tree occurs in dense dry deciduous forest, growing in the understory, taller than 4m with a DBH less than 30cm. The canopy of these forests is dominated by Ebenaceae (particularly Diospyros) and Fabaceae. On Coronation Island, off the coast of the Kimberley, Western Australia, the tree grows in vine thickets (monsoon rainforest pockets). Because of the limited and isolated nature of the Western Australian populations, they have conservation significance.

== Uses ==
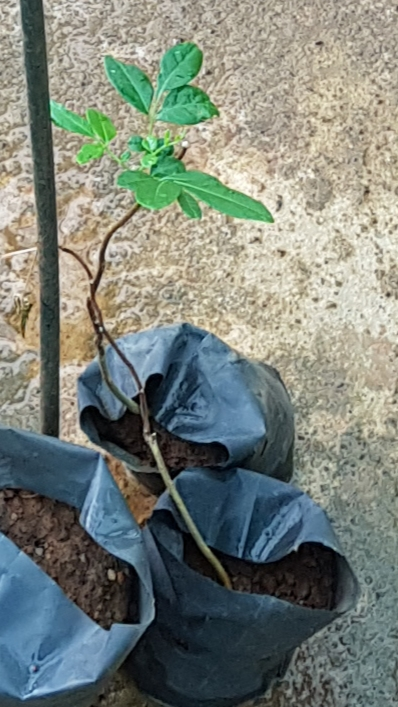
Ailanthus triphysa sapling

The wood is yellowish and brittle; the timber is mainly used for matchwood and plywood, though also makes charcoal. and

When the bark is cut, a sticky resin is exuded, which becomes brittle on drying; this resin may be used for medicinal purposes, and particularly, because of its fixative properties, it may be used an ingredient in incense sticks. In India, the incense resin is named halmaddi, after the local name for the tree itself. Due to crude extraction methods which resulted in trees dying, by the 1990s the Forest Department in India had banned resin extraction; this forced up the price of halmaddi, and its use in incense-making declined. In Cambodia, the resin is also used as incense, whereas the bark is used in local folk medicine against dysentery and intestinal œdema.

The wood contains various alkaloids and quassinoids, including beta-carboline, and has been used for the treatment of dyspepsia, bronchitis, ophthalmia and snake bite.

== Names ==
As well as its botanical names, this tree has common, or vernacular, names. These include: halmaddi, but, in India; hoëm thôm (Khmer, ="severe œdema"); thanh thât (Vietnam); white bean, ferntop ash (Australia).
