= Ailanthus vietnamensis =

Conservation status
- Critically Endangered (IUCN 3.1)

Scientific classification
- Kingdom: Plantae
- Clade: Embryophytes
- Clade: Tracheophytes
- Clade: Spermatophytes
- Clade: Angiosperms
- Clade: Eudicots
- Clade: Rosids
- Order: Sapindales
- Family: Simaroubaceae
- Genus: Ailanthus
- Species: A. vietnamensis

Binomial name
- Ailanthus vietnamensis H.V. Sam & Noot

Species of plant

Ailanthus vietnamensis is a deciduous tree in the family Simaroubaceae, endemic to the wet tropics of Vietnam.

== Description ==
Ailanthus vietnamensis is a monoecious tree that can grow 8 meters in height with a diameter at breast height of 20 centimeters. The bark is yellowish-grey and smooth, and the twigs are stout, and are yellowish-green in color. The lenticles are ochre-colored, and the leaf scars are large and heart-shaped. Leaves are spirally arranged pinnately compound leaves up to 45 cm long, and are clustered at the end with 6-10 pair of opposite leaves. The petiole connecting the leaves are 4-11 centimeters long and are puberulous. The leaflets are entire, and are narrow ovate by 5–11 by 1.5-3.5 cm. They are mostly smooth above and are more pubescent beneath. The leaflets are apex acuminate with an obtuse tip, and the lateral nerves are 6-18 pairs. The midrib and lateral nerves are prominent on the underface and are pubescent, and usually have black, round elliptical glands especially on the nerves.

The inflorescences axillary panicles can be up to 19 centimeters long, and can be puberulous to pubescent. The bisexual flowers are up to 1-3 millimeters and the pedicles are densely hairy. The fruit is a samara, which are narrowly elliptic and can be 7–10 by 1.7-2.4 centimeters away from the flower on a slender stalk. Thin wings surround each single flat seed.
