= Motya (moth) =

- Motya mythias

Scientific classification
- Kingdom: Animalia
- Phylum: Arthropoda
- Clade: Pancrustacea
- Class: Insecta
- Order: Lepidoptera
- Superfamily: Noctuoidea
- Family: Nolidae
- Subfamily: Collomeninae
- Genus: Motya; Walker, 1859

Synonyms
- Lussa Grote, 1883; Pleurasympieza Möschler, 1890

Genus of moths

Motya is a genus of moths of the family Nolidae. The genus was erected by Francis Walker in 1859.

== Species ==
- Motya abseuzalis Walker, 1859 Florida, Antilles to Brazil
- Motya arcuata (Schaus, 1910) Costa Rica
- Motya flotsama (Dyar, 1914) Panama
- Motya griselda (Dyar, 1914) Mexico, Panama, Venezuela
- Motya mythias (Schaus, 1921) Guatemala
- Motya siopera (Dyar, 1914) Panama, Mexico
