= Ailanthus integrifolia =

Conservation status
- Least Concern (IUCN 2.3)

Scientific classification
- Kingdom: Plantae
- Clade: Tracheophytes
- Clade: Angiosperms
- Clade: Eudicots
- Clade: Rosids
- Order: Sapindales
- Family: Simaroubaceae
- Genus: Ailanthus
- Species: A. integrifolia

Binomial name
- Ailanthus integrifolia Lam.

Synonyms
- Ailanthus blancoi Merr.; Ailanthus moluccana DC.; Ailanthus peekelii Melch.; Ailanthus dasyphylla Kuntze; Dysoxylum dasyphyllum Miq.; Pongelion moluccanum (DC.) Pierre

Species of flowering plant

Ailanthus integrifolia, white siris, is a tree in the family Simaroubaceae. The specific epithet integrifolia is from the Latin meaning "entire leaves", referring to the leaflet margins.

== Description ==
Ailanthus integrifolia grows as a large tree up to 55 metres (180 ft) tall with a trunk diameter of up to 65 cm (26 in). The smooth bark is light brown or grey. The ellipsoid fruit, a winged samara measure up to 22 cm (9 in) long, by 5 cm (2.0 in) wide, possibly the largest samaras known.

== Distribution and habitat ==
Ailanthus integrifolia grows naturally in India, Vietnam, Malesia and Papuasia. Its main habitat is primary rainforest from sea-level to 900 m (3,000 ft) altitude.
