= Clettharina =

Scientific classification
- Kingdom: Animalia
- Phylum: Arthropoda
- Class: Insecta
- Order: Lepidoptera
- Superfamily: Noctuoidea
- Family: Nolidae
- Subfamily: Collomeninae
- Genus: Clettharina; Hampson, 1894

Genus of moths

Clettharina is a genus of moths of the family Nolidae. The genus was erected by George Hampson in 1894.

== Species ==
- Clettharina macrocorema Holloway, 2003
- Clettharina nitens Hampson, 1894
