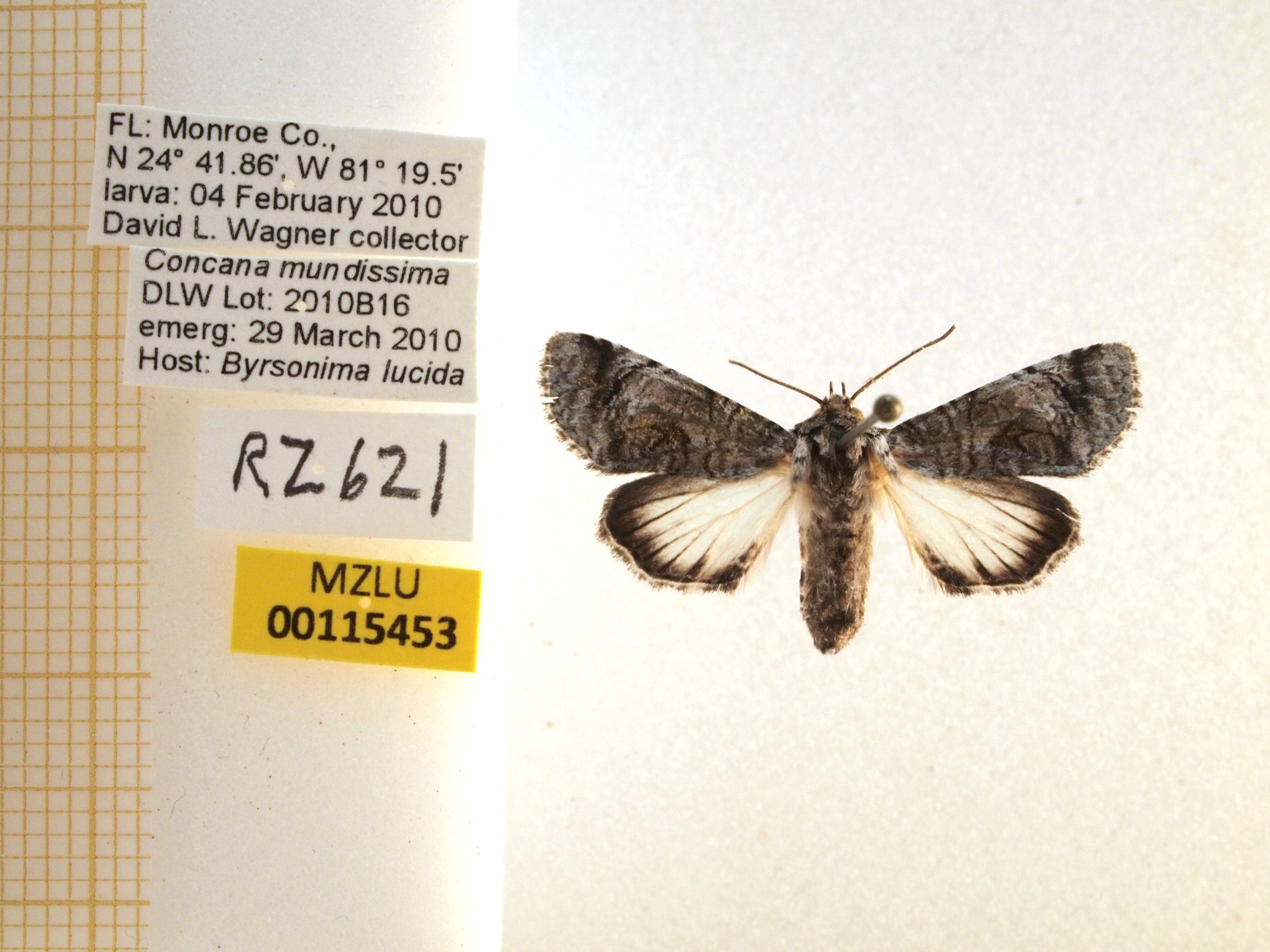

Scientific classification
- Kingdom: Animalia
- Phylum: Arthropoda
- Clade: Pancrustacea
- Class: Insecta
- Order: Lepidoptera
- Superfamily: Noctuoidea
- Family: Nolidae
- Genus: Concana
- Species: C. mundissima

Binomial name
- Concana mundissima Walker, 1858

= Concana mundissima =

Species of moth

Concana mundissima is a species of nolid moth in the family Nolidae. It is found in North America.
