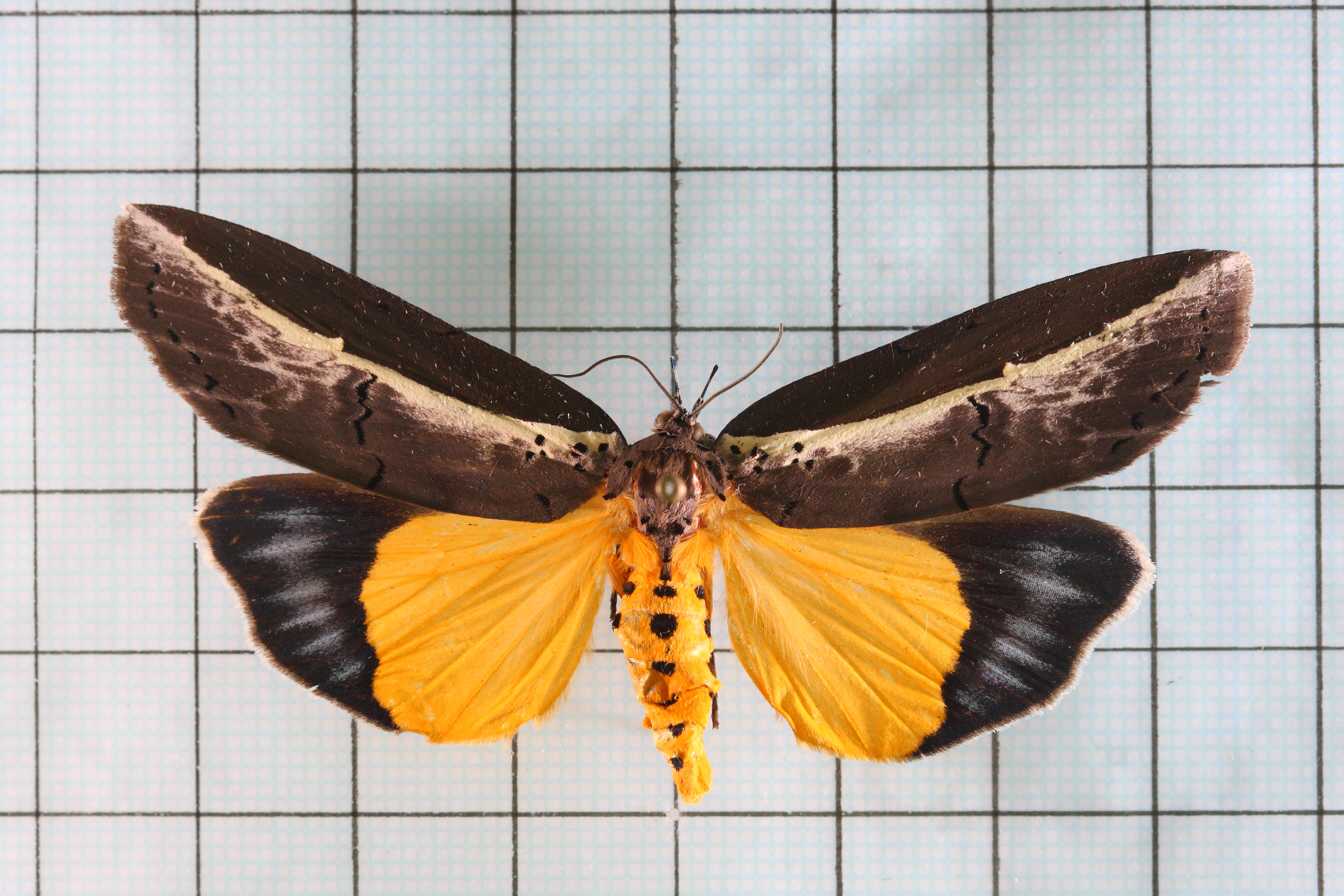
- Eligma narcissus, the Ailanthus defoliator

Scientific classification
- Kingdom: Animalia
- Phylum: Arthropoda
- Class: Insecta
- Order: Lepidoptera
- Superfamily: Noctuoidea
- Family: Nolidae
- Subfamily: Eligminae
- Genus: Eligma; Hübner, 1819

= Eligma =

Genus of moths

Eligma is a genus of tuft moths described by Jacob Hübner in 1819.

== List of species ==
- Eligma allardi Pinhey, 1968
- Eligma bettiana Prout, 1923
- Eligma duplicata Aurivillius, 1892
- Eligma hypsoides Walker, 1869
- Eligma laetipicta Oberthür, 1893
- Eligma malgassica Rothschild, 1896
- Eligma narcissus (Cramer, 1775)
- Eligma neumanni Rothschild, 1924
- Eligma orthoxantha Lower, 1903
