= Bruceantin =

Names
- IUPAC name Methyl (1R,2S,3R,6R,8R,13S,14R,15R,16S,17S)-3-[(E)-3,4-dimethylpent-2-enoyl]oxy-10,15,16-trihydroxy-9,13-dimethyl-4,11-dioxo-5,18-dioxapentacyclo[12.5.0.0^{1,6}.0^{2,17}.0^{8,13}]nonadec-9-ene-17-carboxylate
- Other names Bruceantine

Identifiers
CAS Number	41451-75-6
3D model (JSmol)	Interactive image
ChEBI	CHEBI:3188
ChEMBL	ChEMBL509895
ChemSpider	4444686
KEGG	C08749
PubChem CID	5281304
UNII	S3NW88DI4T
- InChI: InChI=1S/C28H36O11/c1-11(2)12(3)7-17(30)39-20-22-27-10-37-28(22,25(35)36-6)23(33)19(32)21(27)26(5)9-15(29)18(31)13(4)14(26)8-16(27)38-24(20)34/h7,11,14,16,19-23,31-33H,8-10H2,1-6H3/b12-7+/t14-,16+,19+,20+,21+,22+,23-,26-,27+,28-/m0/s1 Key: IRQXZTBHNKVIRL-GOTQHHPNSA-N
- SMILES: CC1=C(C(=O)C[C@]2([C@H]1C[C@@H]3[C@]45[C@@H]2[C@H]([C@@H]([C@]([C@@H]4[C@H](C(=O)O3)OC(=O)/C=C(\C)/C(C)C)(OC5)C(=O)OC)O)O)C)O

Properties
Chemical formula	C_{28}H_{36}O_{11}
Molar mass	548.585 g·mol^{−1}
Melting point	225–226 °C (437–439 °F; 498–499 K)

Hazards
- Lethal dose or concentration (LD, LC)
LD_{50} (median dose)	mouse (male, IV) 1.95 mg/kg mouse (female, IV) 2.58 mg/kg
- Except where otherwise noted, data are given for materials in their standard state (at 25 °C [77 °F], 100 kPa). Infobox references

Bruceantin is a chemical compound that was first isolated from the plant Brucea antidysenterica in 1973. Chemically, it is classified as a secotriterpenoid and a quassinoid.

Bucreantin has attracted interest as a potential antitumor drug because of its antineoplastic activity. It inhibits the peptidyl transferase elongation reaction, resulting in decreased protein and DNA synthesis. Bruceantin also has antibiotic, antiamoebic, and antimalarial activity.

Phase I and II clinical trials were conducted for the treatment of metastatic breast cancer and melanoma, but tumor regression was not observed and clinical development was terminated.
