= Motya abseuzalis =

Scientific classification
- Kingdom: Animalia
- Phylum: Arthropoda
- Clade: Pancrustacea
- Class: Insecta
- Order: Lepidoptera
- Superfamily: Noctuoidea
- Family: Nolidae
- Genus: Motya
- Species: M. abseuzalis

Binomial name
- Motya abseuzalis Walker, 1859

Species of moth

Motya abseuzalis is a species of nolid moth in the family Nolidae. It is found in North America.
