= Concana =

Scientific classification
- Kingdom: Animalia
- Phylum: Arthropoda
- Class: Insecta
- Order: Lepidoptera
- Superfamily: Noctuoidea
- Family: Nolidae
- Subfamily: Collomeninae
- Genus: Concana; Walker, [1858]

Synonyms
- Thelidora Möschler, 1880

Genus of moths

Concana is a genus of moths of the family Noctuidae. The genus was erected by Francis Walker in 1858.

== Species ==
- Concana intricata Schaus, 1911 Costa Rica
- Concana lecta Schaus, 1911 Costa Rica
- Concana mundissima Walker, [1858] Florida, Antilles to Brazil
- Concana permixta Schaus, 1912 Costa Rica
