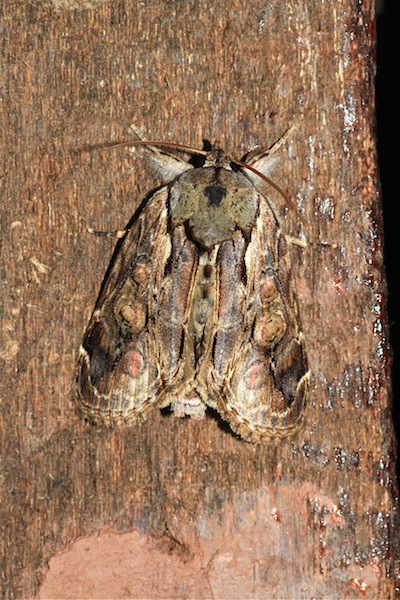
- Triorbis annulata

Scientific classification
- Kingdom: Animalia
- Phylum: Arthropoda
- Clade: Pancrustacea
- Class: Insecta
- Order: Lepidoptera
- Superfamily: Noctuoidea
- Family: Nolidae
- Subfamily: Collomeninae; Zahiri, Lafontaine & Schmidt, 2012

= Collomeninae =

Subfamily of moths

Collomeninae is a subfamily of the moth family Nolidae. The subfamily was erected by Reza Zahiri, J. Donald Lafontaine and B. Christian Schmidt in 2012.

== Genera ==
- Algonia Möschler, 1886
- Collomena Möschler, 1890 - South America
- Concana Walker, [1858]
- Clettharina Hampson, 1894 - Southeast Asia
- Eucalypta Hampson, 1912
- Gadirtha Walker, 1858 - Southeast Asia
  - synonym Scolopocneme - type: Scolopocneme bufonia C. Felder & R. Felder, 1862
- Iscadia Walker, 1857 - Southeast Asia
- Lophosema Schaus, 1910
- Sebagena Walker, 1865
- Triorbis Hampson, 1894 - Southeast Asia
