= Bruceanol =

Bruceanol A-H

Bruceanols are quassinoids isolated from Brucea antidysenterica.

== Bruceanols ==
- Bruceanol A
- Bruceanol B
- Bruceanol C
- Bruceanol D
- Bruceanol E
- Bruceanol F
- Bruceanol G
- Bruceanol H
