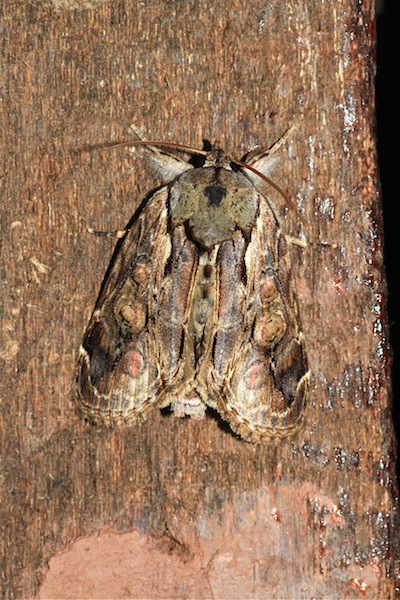
- Triorbis annulata

Scientific classification
- Kingdom: Animalia
- Phylum: Arthropoda
- Class: Insecta
- Order: Lepidoptera
- Superfamily: Noctuoidea
- Family: Nolidae
- Subfamily: Collomeninae
- Genus: Triorbis; Hampson, 1894

= Triorbis =

Genus of moths

Triorbis is a genus of moths of the family Nolidae. The genus was erected by George Hampson in 1894.

== Species ==
- Triorbis annulata (Swinhoe, 1890)
- Triorbis aureovitta Hampson, 1902
