= Gutolactone =

Names
- Other names Gurolactone

Identifiers
CAS Number	152369-48-7
3D model (JSmol)	Interactive image
ChEBI	CHEBI:65989
ChemSpider	29367970
PubChem CID	70697826
CompTox Dashboard (EPA)	DTXSID90934486
- InChI: InChI=1S/C25H32O9/c1-10(2)6-15(27)34-17-19-24(5)21(30)16(28)18-23(4)12(11(3)7-13(26)20(23)29)8-14(33-22(17)31)25(18,19)9-32-24/h6-7,12,14,16-21,28-30H,8-9H2,1-5H3/t12-,14+,16+,17+,18+,19-,20+,21-,23-,24-,25+/m0/s1 Key: WSUNNCJENRRPLS-DQVMPRLHSA-N
- SMILES: CC1=CC(=O)[C@H]([C@]2([C@H]1C[C@@H]3[C@]45[C@@H]2[C@H]([C@@H]([C@]([C@@H]4[C@H](C(=O)O3)OC(=O)C=C(C)C)(OC5)C)O)O)C)O

Properties
Chemical formula	C_{25}H_{32}O_{9}
Molar mass	476.522 g·mol^{−1}
- Except where otherwise noted, data are given for materials in their standard state (at 25 °C [77 °F], 100 kPa). Infobox references

Gutolactone is a chemical compound extracted from Simaba guianensis and it has displayed antimalarial properties in vitro.
