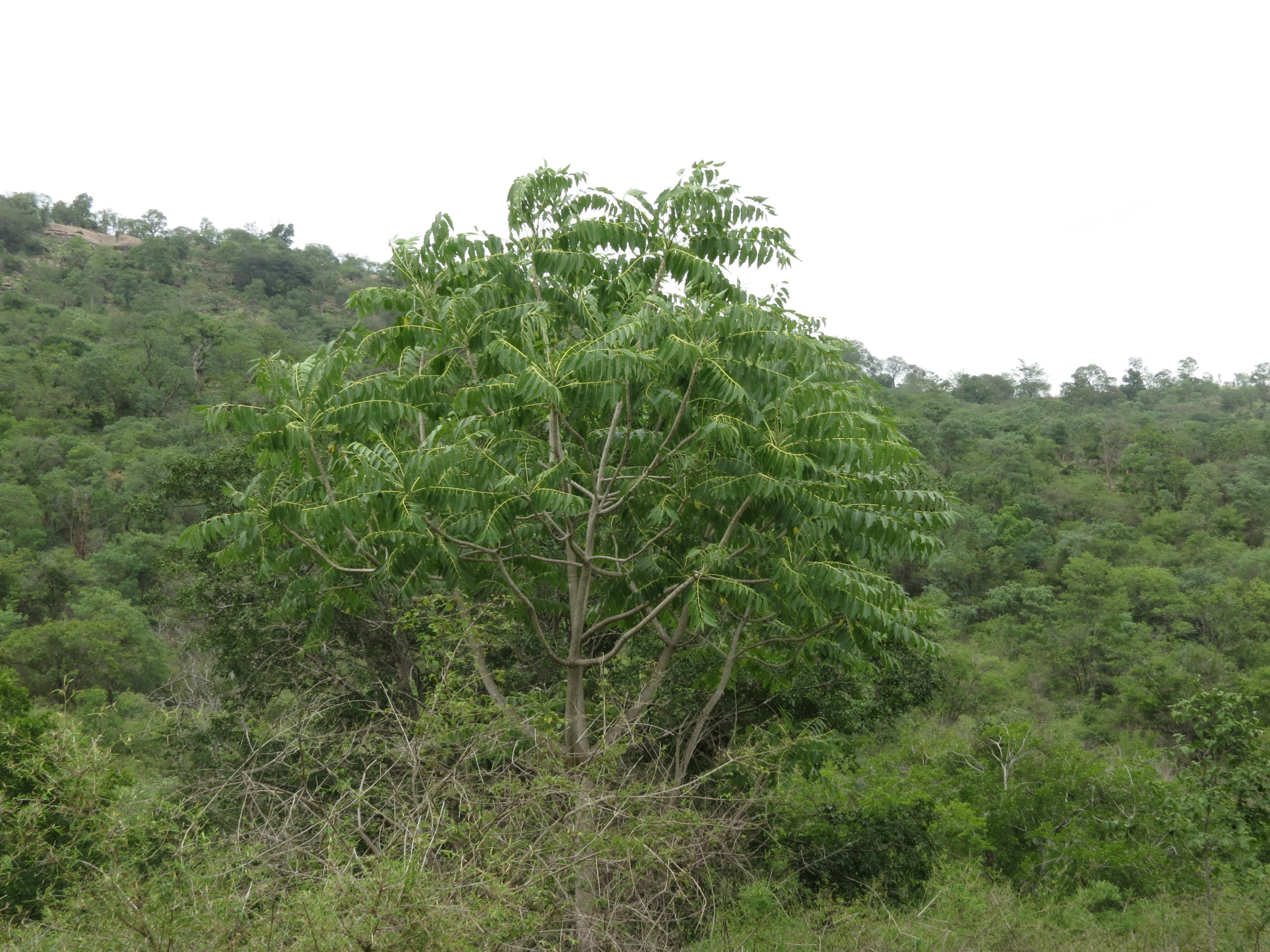
- Illustration

Scientific classification
- Kingdom: Plantae
- Clade: Tracheophytes
- Clade: Angiosperms
- Clade: Eudicots
- Clade: Rosids
- Order: Sapindales
- Family: Simaroubaceae
- Genus: Ailanthus
- Species: A. excelsa

Binomial name
- Ailanthus excelsa Roxb.

Synonyms
- Ailanthus wightii Tiegh.

= Ailanthus excelsa =

Species of flowering plant

Ailanthus excelsa, commonly known as tree of heaven, is a large deciduous tree found in India and Sri Lanka. In Tamil, it is also known as Pi-Nari Maram due to its disagreeable odor. The trees are grown along the edges of fields and rivers to mark boundaries and prevent soil erosion.

The tree has several uses in medicine as the gum and the bitter, aromatic leaves are reported to have medicinal properties. The bark is a febrifuge and can be used as a treatment against asthma, bronchitis and dysentery. The leaves and bark are also in good repute as a tonic that is used after labor. The juice of the leaves and fresh bark is used as a remedy for after-pains.

The tree is also used in matchstick industry, as fodder for goats, and is one of the best tree used to trap Suspended Particulate Matter (SPM).

== Media ==
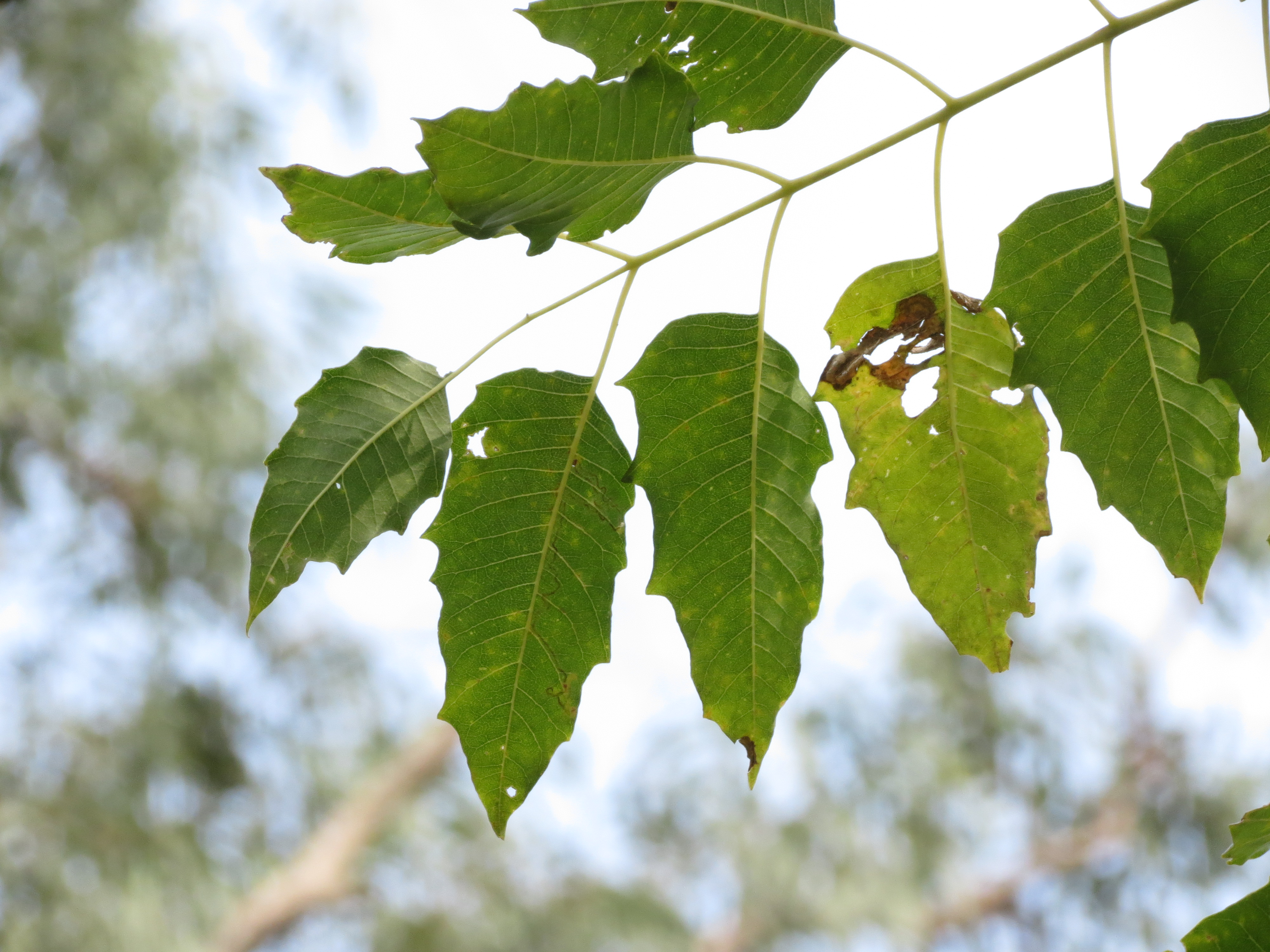

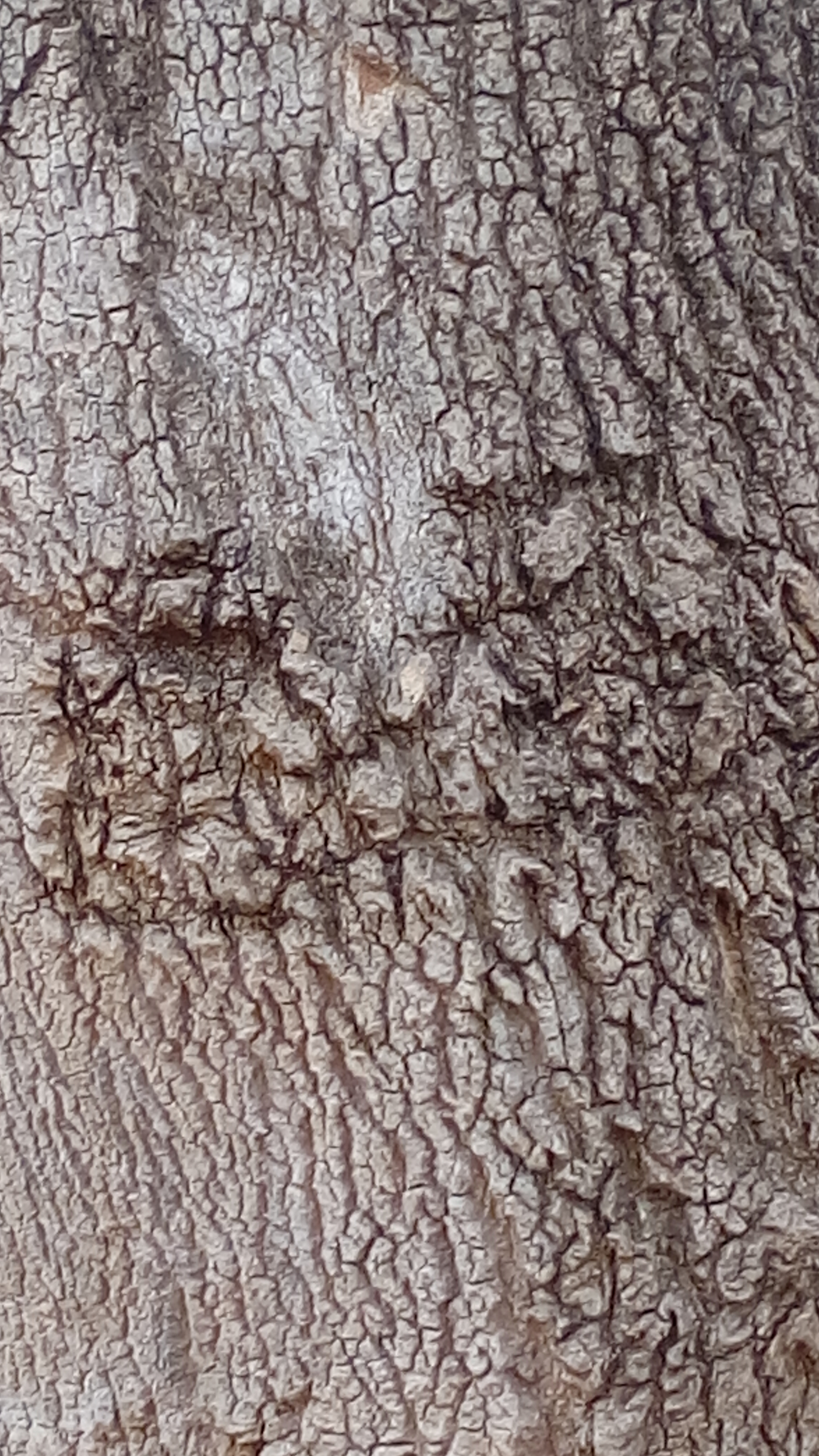

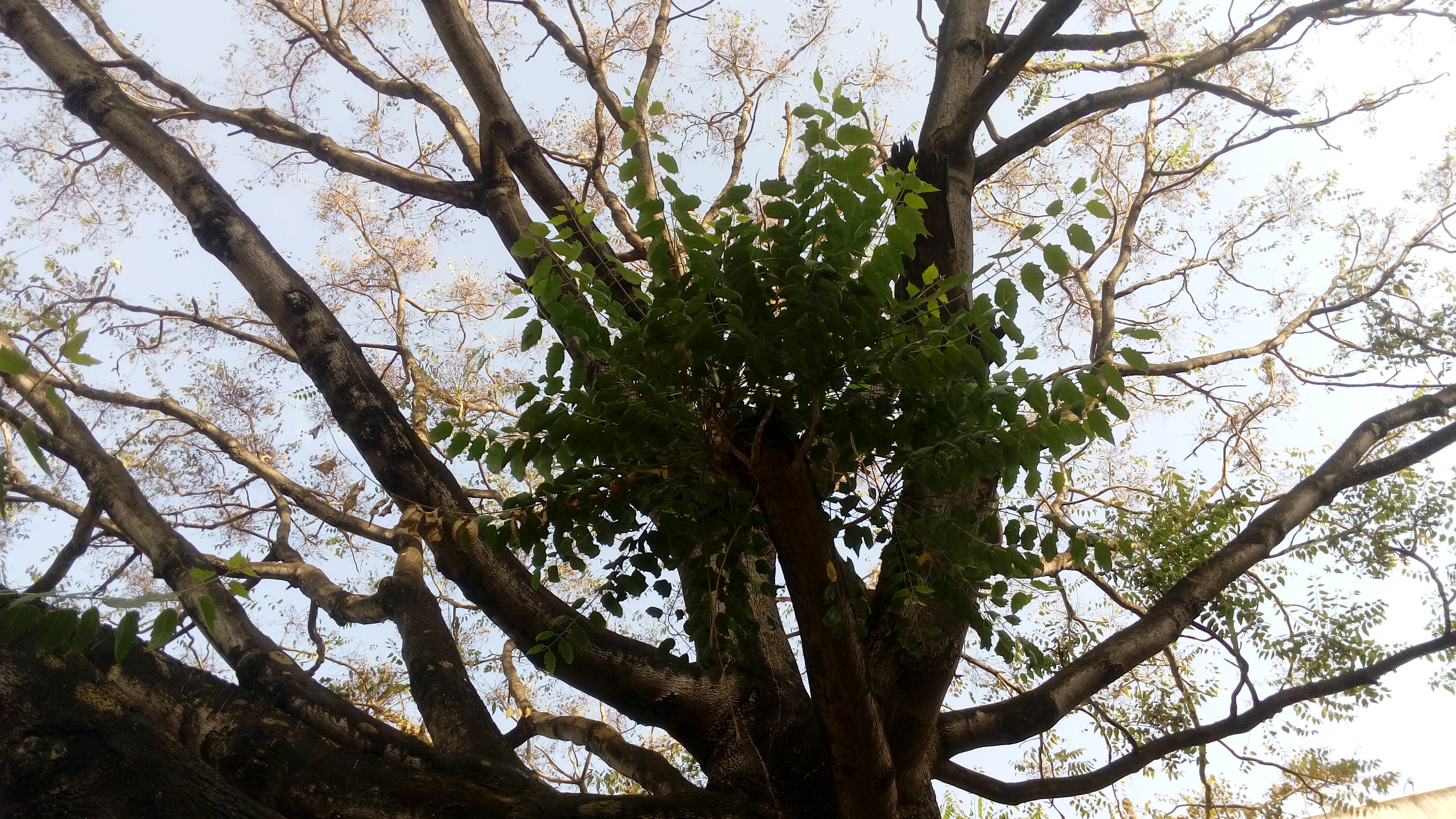

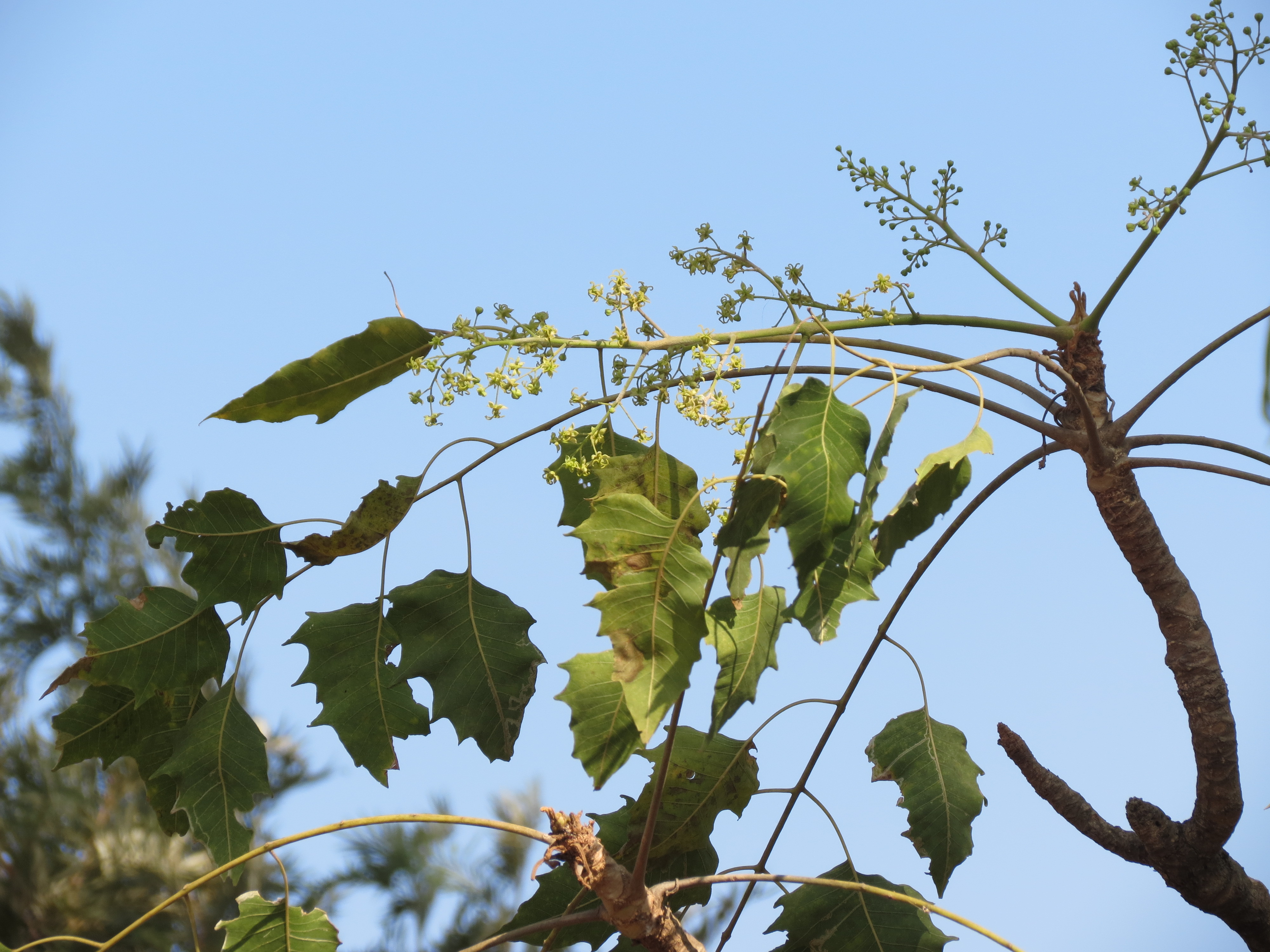
