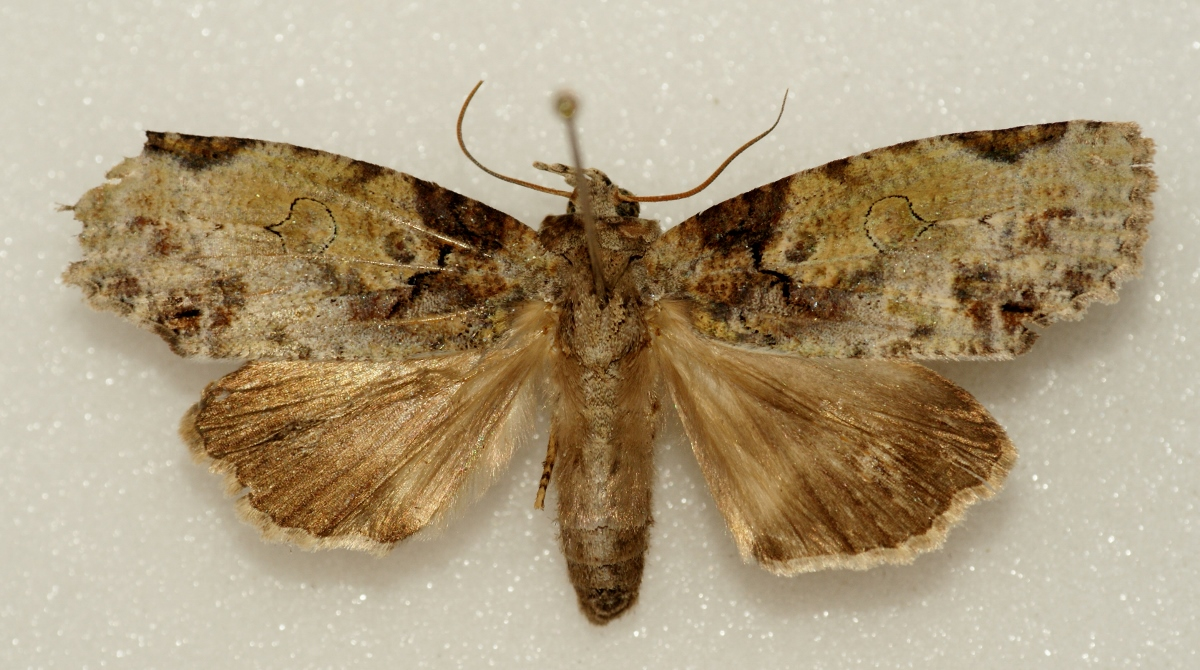

Scientific classification
- Kingdom: Animalia
- Phylum: Arthropoda
- Class: Insecta
- Order: Lepidoptera
- Superfamily: Noctuoidea
- Family: Nolidae
- Genus: Gadirtha
- Species: G. inexacta

Binomial name
- Gadirtha inexacta Walker, [1858]

Synonyms
- Iscadia inexacta (Walker, 1858)

= Gadirtha inexacta =

Species of moth

Gadirtha inexacta is a moth of the family Nolidae first described by Francis Walker in 1858. It is found in northern India and Myanmar, as well as on Borneo. It has also been recorded from Queensland and New South Wales in Australia.

Adults are patchy brown, with two dark marks on the forewings.

The larvae feed on various Euphorbiaceae species, including Omalanthus populifolius, Sapium discolor and Triadica sebifera.
