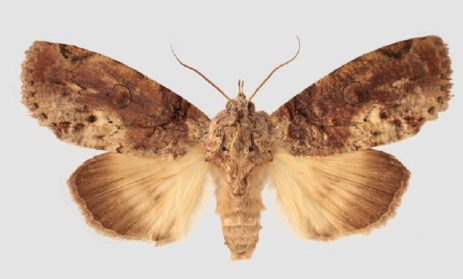
- Female
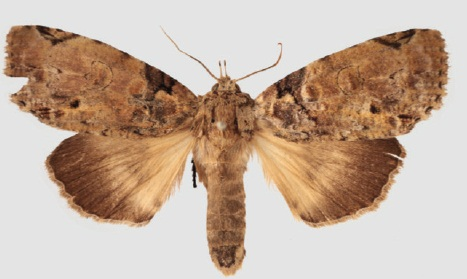
- Male

Scientific classification
- Kingdom: Animalia
- Phylum: Arthropoda
- Class: Insecta
- Order: Lepidoptera
- Superfamily: Noctuoidea
- Family: Nolidae
- Subfamily: Collomeninae
- Genus: Gadirtha
- Species: G. impingens

Binomial name
- Gadirtha impingens Walker, [1858]

Synonyms
- Iscadia impingens; Scolopocneme bufonia C. & R. Felder, 1862; Gadirtha inexacta ab. uniformis Warren, 1913; Gadirtha uniformis Sugi, 1982; Checupa tinctoides Snellen, 1877; Gadirtha inexacta buruensis Prout, 1926; Gadirtha inexacta ab. papuensis Warren, 1913; Gadirtha guineana Swinhoe, 1918; Gadirtha papuensis Gaede, 1937

= Gadirtha impingens =

Species of moth

Gadirtha impingens is a moth of the family Nolidae first described by Francis Walker in 1858. It is found from northern India and southern China to Queensland, the Bismarck Archipelago and the Solomon Islands, as well in Japan (Honshu, Shikoku, Kyushu, Tsushima). The habitat consists of lowland areas up to 2,600 meters, but it is most frequent at elevations ranging from 1,000 to 2,000 meters.

The larvae feed on Sapium and Stillingia species.

== Subspecies ==
- Gadirtha impingens impingens
- Gadirtha impingens guineana Swinhoe, 1918 (New Guinea)
- Gadirtha impingens tinctoides Snellen, 1877 (Sundaland to the Moluccas)
- Gadirtha impingens uniformis Sugi, 1982 (north-eastern Himalaya)
