= Bruceolide =

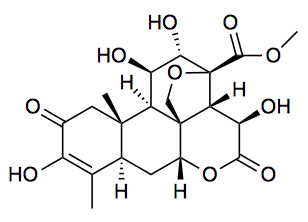

Names
- IUPAC name Methyl 3,11β,12α,15β-tetrahydroxy-2,16-dioxo-13,20-epoxy-13β-picras-3-en-21-oate
- Systematic IUPAC name Methyl (1R,2S,3S,3aS,3a^{1}R,4R,6aR,7aR,11aS,11bR)-1,2,4,9-tetrahydroxy-8,11a-dimethyl-5,10-dioxo-1,3,3a,4,5,6a,7,7a,10,11,11a,11b-dodecahydro-2H-3,3a^{1}-(epoxymethano)phenanthro[10,1-bc]pyran-3-carboxylate

Identifiers
CAS Number	25514-28-7
3D model (JSmol)	Interactive image
ChEBI	CHEBI:65529
ChEMBL	ChEMBL140588
ChemSpider	89922
PubChem CID	99531
CompTox Dashboard (EPA)	DTXSID30948401
- InChI: InChI=1S/C21H26O10/c1-7-8-4-10-20-6-30-21(18(28)29-3,15(20)13(25)17(27)31-10)16(26)12(24)14(20)19(8,2)5-9(22)11(7)23/h8,10,12-16,23-26H,4-6H2,1-3H3/t8-,10+,12+,13+,14+,15+,16-,19-,20+,21-/m0/s1 Key: YLWQKYSDNGHLAO-PWRINDRCSA-N
- SMILES: CC1=C(C(=O)C[C@]2([C@H]1C[C@@H]3[C@]45[C@@H]2[C@H]([C@@H]([C@]([C@@H]4[C@H](C(=O)O3)O)(OC5)C(=O)OC)O)O)C)O

Properties
Chemical formula	C_{21}H_{26}O_{10}
Molar mass	438.429 g·mol^{−1}
- Except where otherwise noted, data are given for materials in their standard state (at 25 °C [77 °F], 100 kPa). Infobox references

Bruceolide is a quassinoid that has been isolated from Bischofia javanica. Synthetic derivatives have shown in vitro antimalarial activity.

== See also ==
- Quassinoid
- Bischofia javanica
- Antimalarial drug
- Malaria
- Medicinal plant
- In vitro
