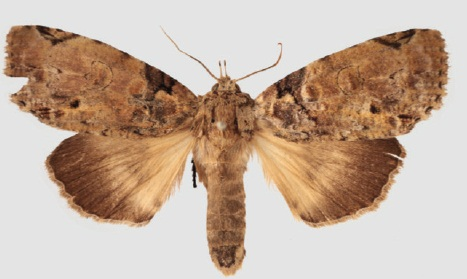
- Gadirtha impingens male

Scientific classification
- Kingdom: Animalia
- Phylum: Arthropoda
- Class: Insecta
- Order: Lepidoptera
- Superfamily: Noctuoidea
- Family: Nolidae
- Subfamily: Collomeninae
- Genus: Gadirtha; Walker, [1858]

Synonyms
- Scolopocneme C. & R. Felder, 1862

= Gadirtha =

Genus of moths

Gadirtha is a genus of moths of the family Nolidae.

== Species ==
- Gadirtha fusca Pogue, 2014
- Gadirtha impingens Walker, [1858]
- Gadirtha inexacta Walker, [1858]
- Gadirtha pulchra Butler, 1886
