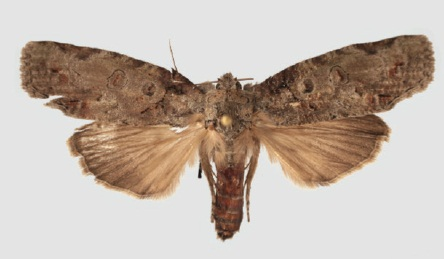
- Female
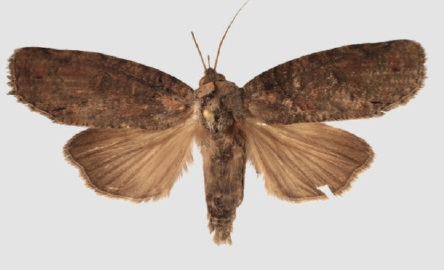
- Male

Scientific classification
- Domain: Eukaryota
- Kingdom: Animalia
- Phylum: Arthropoda
- Class: Insecta
- Order: Lepidoptera
- Superfamily: Noctuoidea
- Family: Nolidae
- Genus: Gadirtha
- Species: G. fusca

Binomial name
- Gadirtha fusca Pogue, 2014

= Gadirtha fusca =

Species of moth

Gadirtha fusca is a moth of the family Nolidae. It is found in east-central and south-eastern China.

The length of the forewings is 18.5–22.4 mm for males and 20.9–23.1 mm for females. The ground colour of the forewings in males is brownish grey, with varying amounts of indistinct rufous areas. There is a rectangulate dark grey basal spot on the costa and a fainter dark grey triangulate spot proximal to the apex. The hindwings are dark grey. Females have pale brownish grey forewings. There are four to five generations per year in Hubei.

The larvae feed on the leaves of Triadica sebifera. There are six larval instars. The larvae reach a length of 28–33.5 mm and have a pale green to yellow-green ground colour and a yellow head. The species overwinters as an egg on the leaves and branches of the host plant. The eggs hatch in May.

== Etymology ==
The species name refers to the dark greyish brown ground colour of the forewings.

== Gallery ==
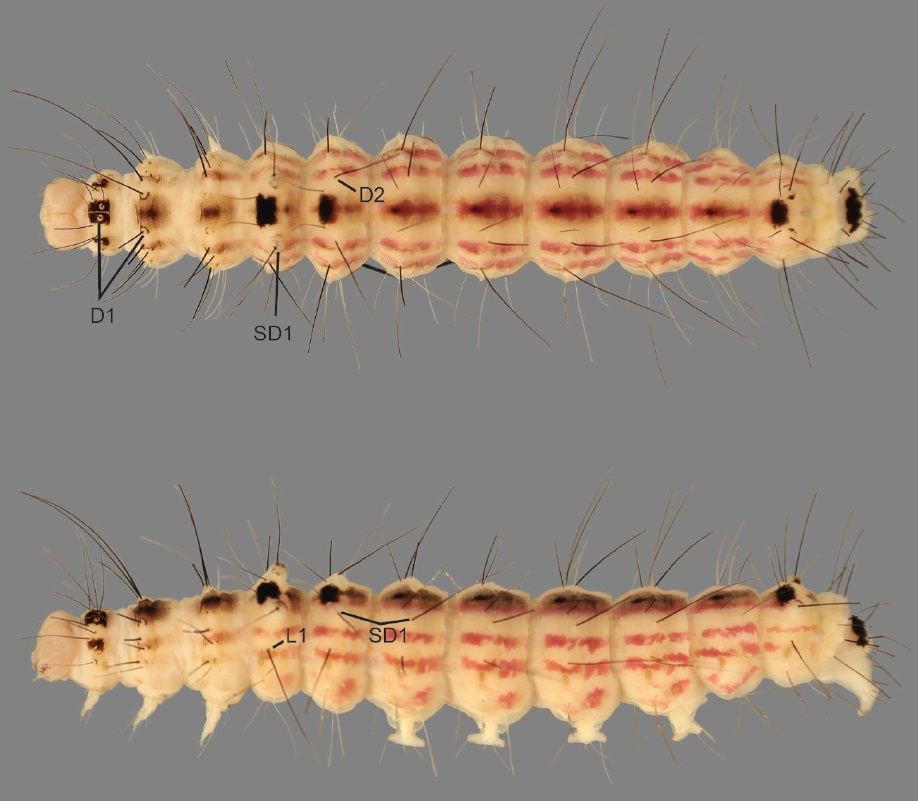
Larva: dorsal and ventral view

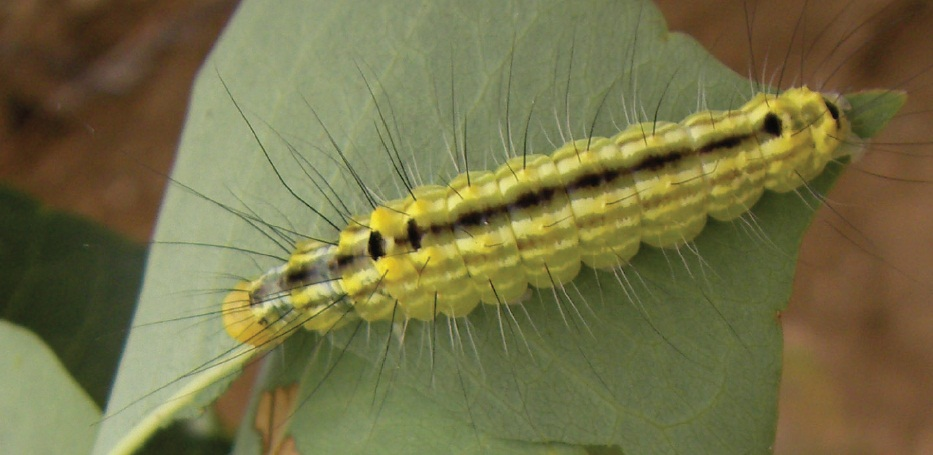
Larva on Triadica sebifera

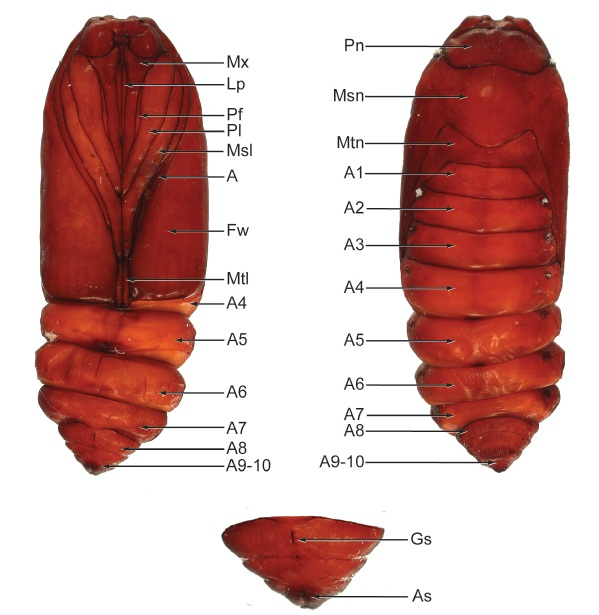
Female pupa

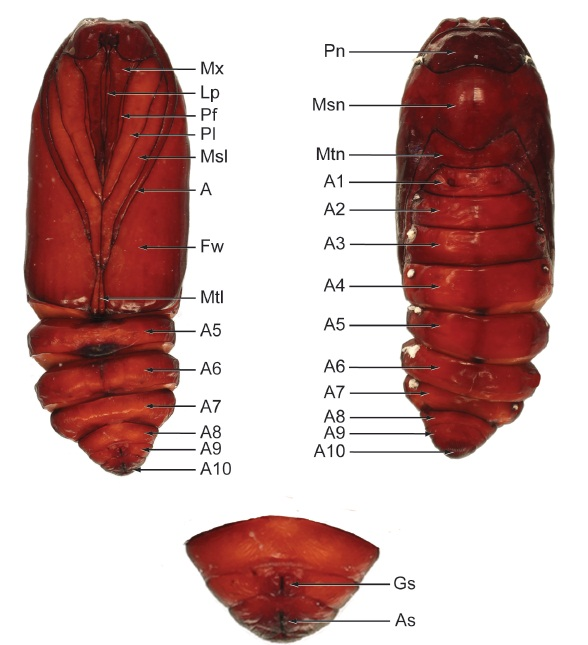
Male pupa
