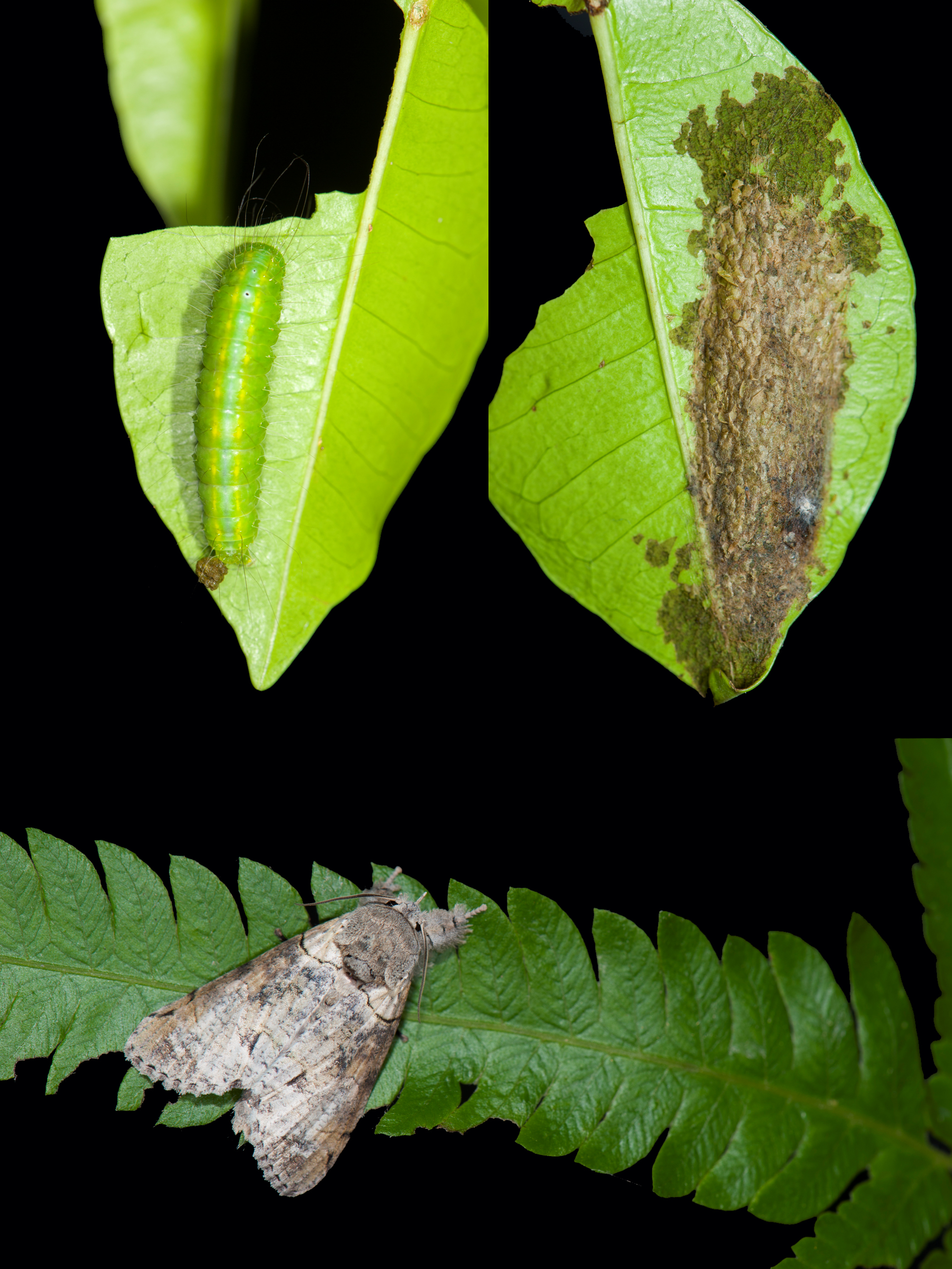

Scientific classification
- Domain: Eukaryota
- Kingdom: Animalia
- Phylum: Arthropoda
- Class: Insecta
- Order: Lepidoptera
- Superfamily: Noctuoidea
- Family: Nolidae
- Genus: Gadirtha
- Species: G. pulchra

Binomial name
- Gadirtha pulchra Butler, 1886

Synonyms
- Iscadia pulchra; Hypogramma distincta Lucas, 1892; Gadirtha fuscithorax Strand, 1917; Gadirtha fuscithorax Gaede, 1937

= Gadirtha pulchra =

Species of moth

Gadirtha pulchra is a moth of the family Nolidae first described by Arthur Gardiner Butler in 1886. It is found from the Indian subregion to the Ryukyu Islands in Japan and Thailand, Singapore, New Guinea and Queensland in Australia.

The larvae feed on Sapium and Excoecaria species.
