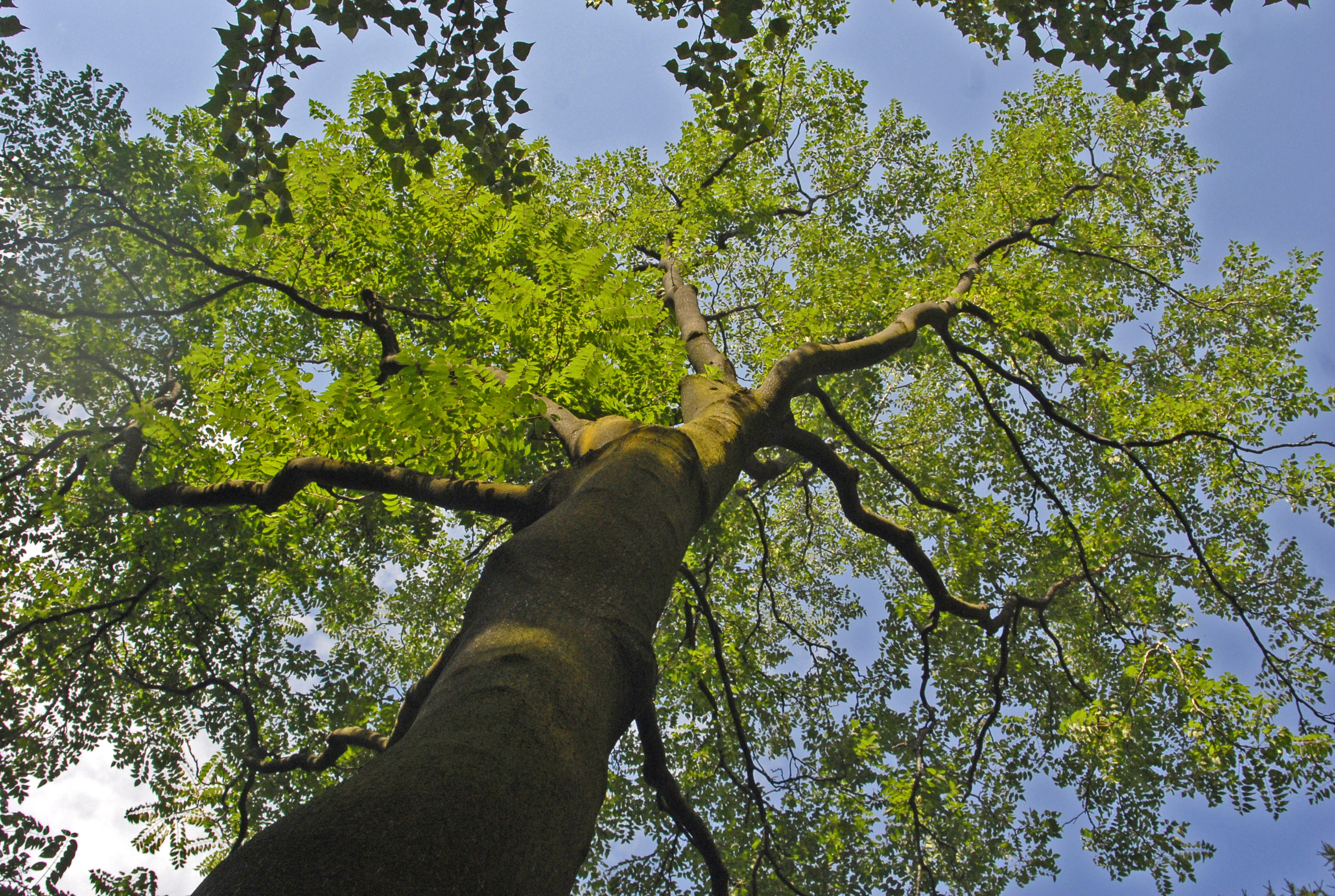
- Ailanthus vilmoriniana at the Orto Botanico di Brera

Scientific classification
- Kingdom: Plantae
- Clade: Tracheophytes
- Clade: Angiosperms
- Clade: Eudicots
- Clade: Rosids
- Order: Sapindales
- Family: Simaroubaceae
- Genus: Ailanthus
- Species: A. vilmoriniana

Binomial name
- Ailanthus vilmoriniana Dode

= Ailanthus vilmoriniana =

Species of tree

Ailanthus vilmoriniana, commonly known as downy tree of heaven, is a tree in the quassia family. It is native to western China, but is occasionally encountered in northern European gardens.

== Description ==
Ailanthus vilmoriniana is a tree that often attains heights of 20 metres or more with a crown spread of 15 metres. The new shoots occasionally have small green spines. The leaves are quite similar to those of A. altissima, but they are darker in colour and pendulous. The rachis is finely pubescent and is a consistent deep red in colour. It is also longer, being up to 1 metre long on pollards, and with more leaflets, usually numbering 23 to 35, though they have sometimes as few as 20. The leaves are pubescent beneath. The bole itself occasionally will have sprouts emerging from it.

== Taxonomic status ==
Ailanthus vilmoriniana is sometimes regarded as a separate species, for instance in Flora of China, but other authorities consider A. vilmoriniana a synonym of A. altissima, like The Plant List and International Plant Names Index (IPNI).

== Cultivation ==
Ailanthus vilmoriniana is endemic to China, and then was brought to the United Kingdom by Paul Guillaume Farges. The downy tree of heaven was first grown in the United Kingdom in 1897, but it is rarely found in gardens within the British Isles. It is occasionally encountered in plant collections as well as gardens in the south of England. Specimens are also present as far north as the Royal Botanic Gardens in Edinburgh.
