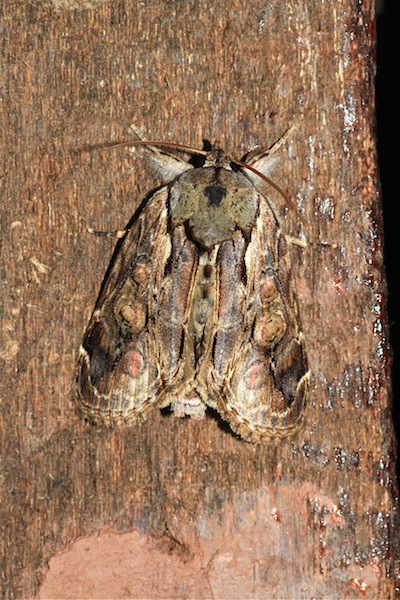
- In the Trusmadi area of Borneo

Scientific classification
- Domain: Eukaryota
- Kingdom: Animalia
- Phylum: Arthropoda
- Class: Insecta
- Order: Lepidoptera
- Superfamily: Noctuoidea
- Family: Nolidae
- Genus: Triorbis
- Species: T. annulata

Binomial name
- Triorbis annulata C. Swinhoe, 1890

Synonyms
- Hyperoeschra annulata C. Swinhoe, 1890

= Triorbis annulata =

Species of moth

Triorbis annulata is a moth in the family Nolidae first described by Charles Swinhoe in 1890. It is found in Myanmar, Peninsular Malaysia, on Borneo and Luzon.

Adults have dark red-brown forewings with a much reduced lens-shaped basal streak.
