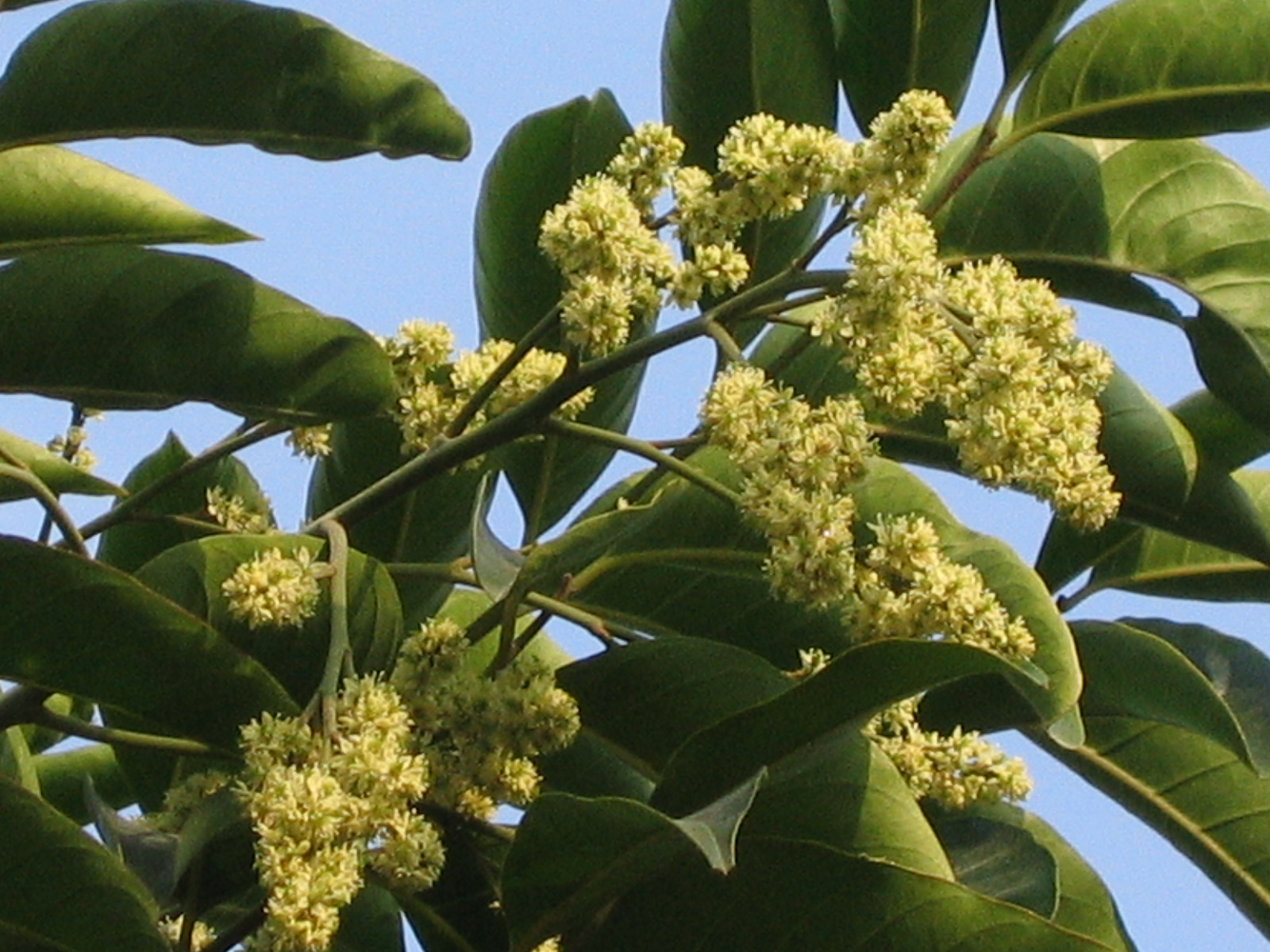

Scientific classification
- Kingdom: Plantae
- Clade: Tracheophytes
- Clade: Angiosperms
- Clade: Eudicots
- Clade: Rosids
- Order: Sapindales
- Family: Simaroubaceae
- Genus: Ailanthus
- Species: A. fordii

Binomial name
- Ailanthus fordii Noot.

= Ailanthus fordii =

Species of tree

Ailanthus fordii, otherwise known as green ailanthus or evergreen ailanthus, is an evergreen tree in the family Simaroubaceae. It is native to the low evergreen forests of Hong Kong.

== History ==
Ailanthus fordii was first discovered in Cape D'Aguilar between the years 1884 and 1886.

== Description ==
Ailanthus fordii is a dioecious, evergreen tree that can grow up to 5 metres (16 ft) tall. The branchlets are grey-brown and are densely puberulent. Odd, pinnately compound leaves are gathered at the upmost part of the branches and are 40-60 centimeters long. The petiole is 0.7–1.3 cm (0.3–0.5 in) long, and there are 13-27 leaflets, mostly opposite. The leaflets are oblong-ovate, and are 7–13 centimetres (2.8–5.1 in) long 4–6 cm (1.6–2.4 in) wide. The buds are inflorescence terminal, paniculate, and are 20-40 centimeters long. The flowers can be unisexual or polygamous, and they are calyx-cup shaped. Petals are about 2–3 millimetres (0.08–0.12 in). In female flowers, the anthers are imperfectly developed.

The samara is 3–5 centimetres (1.2–2.0 in) long and 1–1.8 cm (0.4–0.7 in) wide. The flowering period is October to November, and the fruiting period is December to April the following year.
