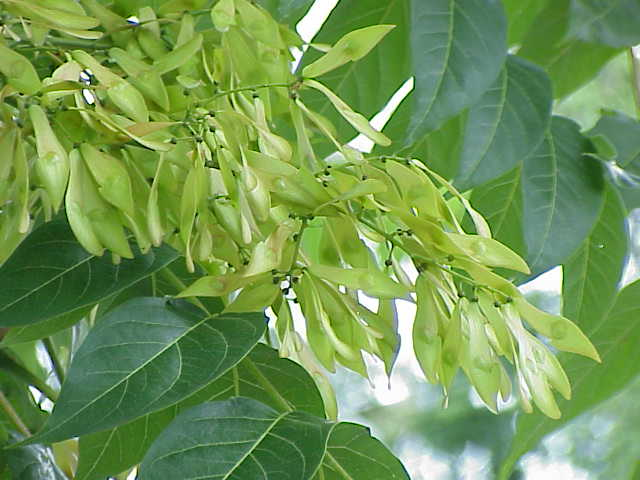
- Ailanthus altissima leaf and fruit

Scientific classification
- Kingdom: Plantae
- Clade: Tracheophytes
- Clade: Angiosperms
- Clade: Eudicots
- Clade: Rosids
- Order: Sapindales
- Family: Simaroubaceae
- Genus: Ailanthus; Desf.

Species
- See text

Synonyms
- Hebonga Radlk. (1911 publ. 1912); Pongelion Adans. (1763), nom. rej.

= Ailanthus =

Genus of flowering trees

Ailanthus (/əˈlænθəs/; derived from ailanto, an Ambonese word probably meaning "tree of the gods" or "tree of heaven") is a genus of trees belonging to the family Simaroubaceae, in the order Sapindales (formerly Rutales or Geraniales). The genus is native from East Asia south to northern Australasia. One species, the tree of heaven (Ailanthus altissima), is considered a weed or invasive species in some parts of the world.

== Selected species ==
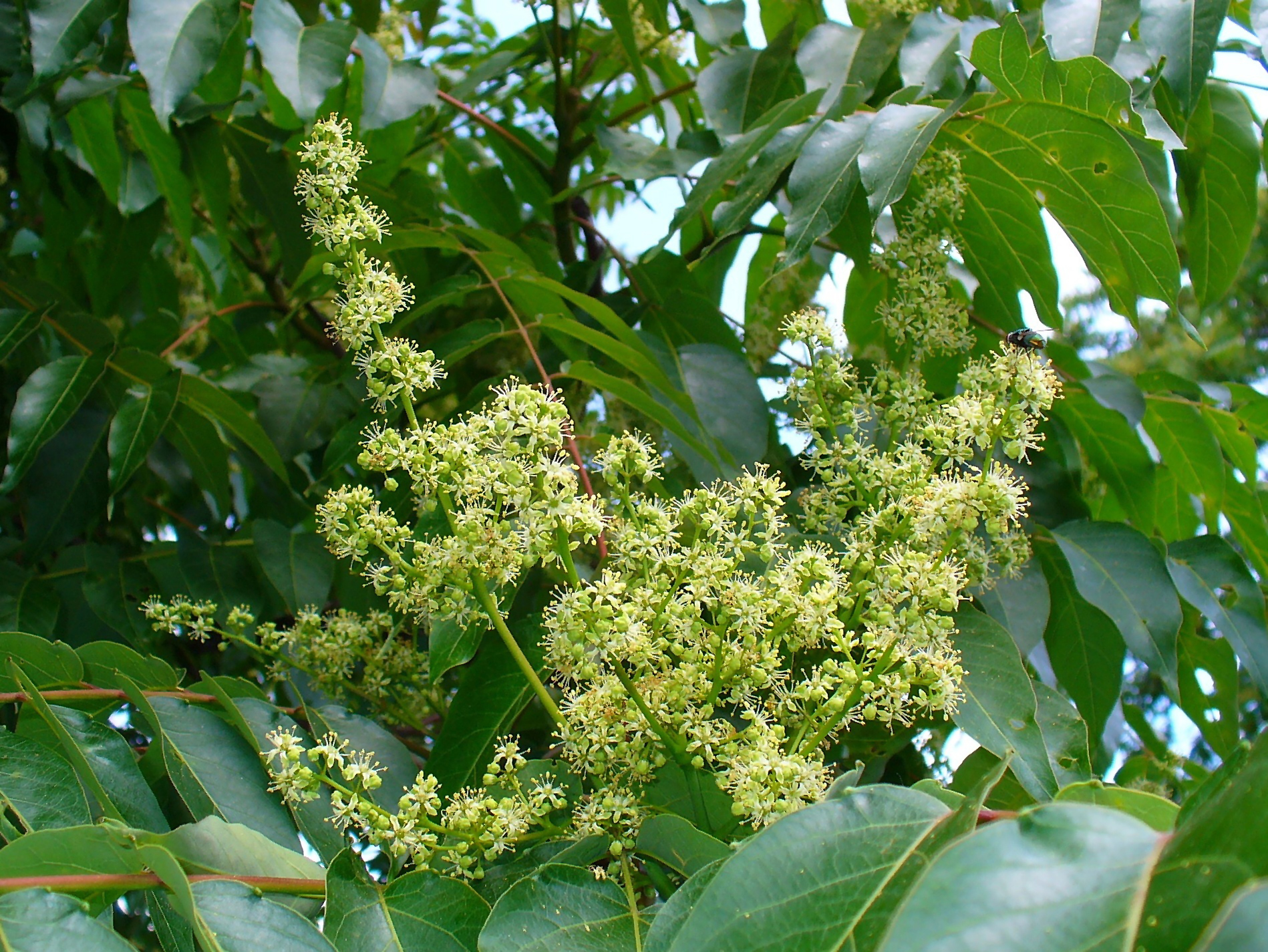
Ailanthus altissima, male flowers

The number of living species is disputed, with some authorities accepting up to ten species, while others accept six or fewer. Species include:

- Ailanthus altissima (Mill.) Swingle (tree of heaven, syn. A. vilmoriniana Dode) – northern and central mainland China, Taiwan. Invasive in North America, Europe, Britain, and Australia. Serves as central metaphor in A Tree Grows in Brooklyn.
- Ailanthus excelsa Roxb. – India and Sri Lanka
- Ailanthus fordii Noot. – China
- Ailanthus integrifolia Lam. – New Guinea and Queensland, Australia
- Ailanthus triphysa (Dennst.) Alston (white siris syn. A. malabarica) – India, South-east Asia and Australia
- Ailanthus vietnamensis H.V.Sam & Noot. – Vietnam

There is a good fossil record of Ailanthus with many species names based on their geographic occurrence, but almost all of these have very similar morphology and have been grouped as a single species among the three species recognized:

- Ailanthus tardensis Hably – from a single locality in Hungary
- Ailanthus confucii Unger – Tertiary period, Europe, Asia, and North America
- Ailanthus gigas Unger – from a single locality in Slovenia
- Ailanthus pythii Unger – known from the Miocene of Iceland, Styria in Austria and the Gavdos island in Greece
- Ailanthus kurzii Prain – endemic to the Andaman Islands, India
- Ailanthus maximus Liu – known from the latest Paleocene to late Oligocene in the Tibetan Plateau

== Ailanthus silk moth ==
A silk spinning moth, the ailanthus silkmoth (Samia cynthia), lives on Ailanthus leaves, and yields a silk more durable and cheaper than mulberry silk, but inferior to it in fineness and gloss. This moth has been introduced to the eastern United States and is common near many towns; it is about 12 cm across, with angulated wings, and in color olive brown, with white markings. Other Lepidoptera whose larvae feed on Ailanthus include Endoclita malabaricus, and Atteva aurea (commonly known as the Ailanthus webworm moth).

== See also ==
- Spotted lanternfly
