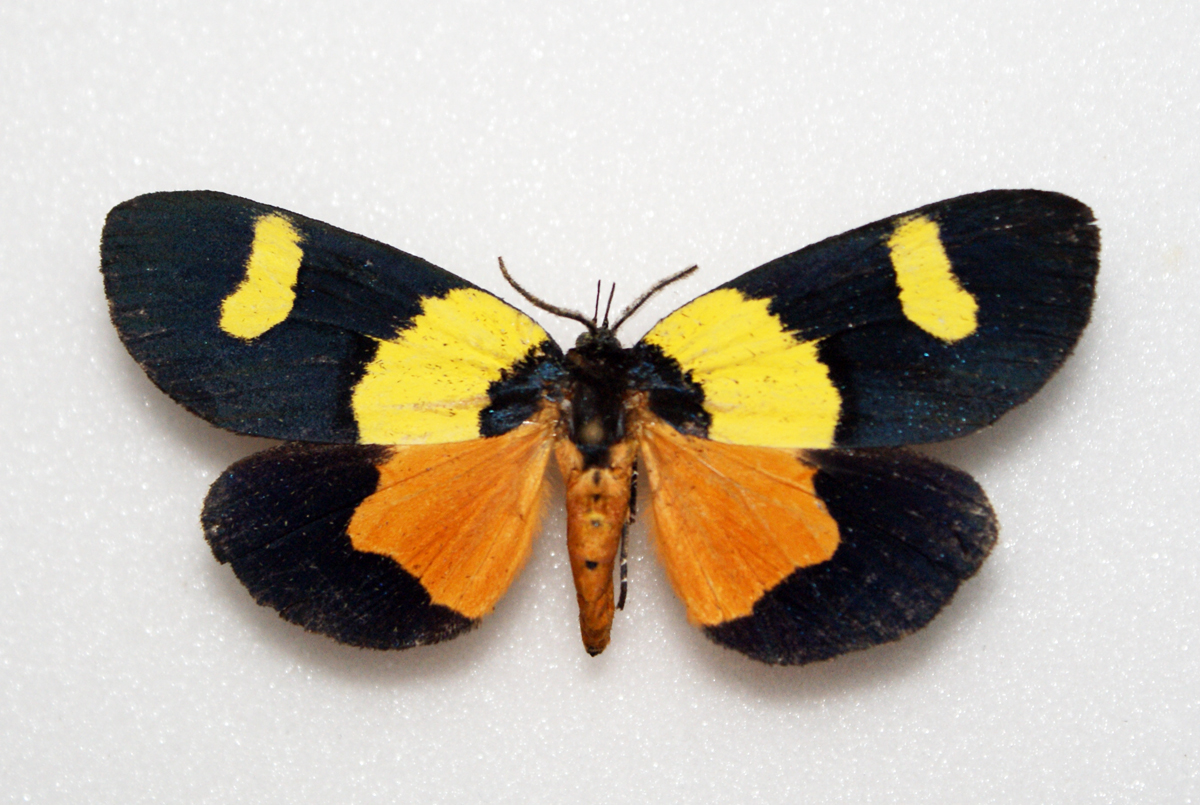

Scientific classification
- Kingdom: Animalia
- Phylum: Arthropoda
- Class: Insecta
- Order: Lepidoptera
- Superfamily: Noctuoidea
- Family: Nolidae
- Genus: Eligma
- Species: E. laetipicta

Binomial name
- Eligma laetipicta Oberthür, 1893

Synonyms
- Eligma uncata Strand, 1915

= Eligma laetipicta =

Species of moth

Eligma laetipicta is a species of tuft moth described by Charles Oberthür in 1893.
