= Eligma malgassica =

Scientific classification
- Domain: Eukaryota
- Kingdom: Animalia
- Phylum: Arthropoda
- Class: Insecta
- Order: Lepidoptera
- Superfamily: Noctuoidea
- Family: Nolidae
- Genus: Eligma
- Species: E. malgassica

Binomial name
- Eligma malgassica Rothschild, 1896

Species of moth

Eligma malgassica is a moth in the family Nolidae. This species was first described by Walter Rothschild in 1896 and is endemic to Madagascar.

== Notes ==
The Afromoths database refers to the species as Eligma malagassica as does the Global Lepidoptera Names Index of the Natural History Museum, London.
