= Quassinoid =

Class of chemical compounds

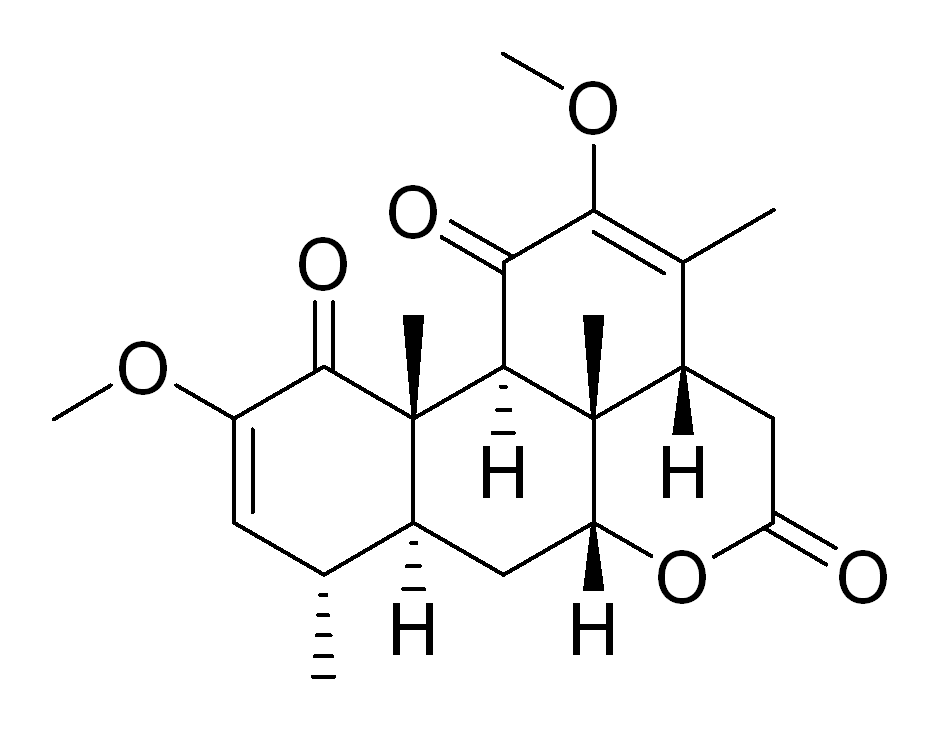
Chemical structure of quassin

Quassinoids are degraded triterpene lactones (similar to limonoids) of the Simaroubaceae plant family grouped into C-18, C-19, C-20, C-22 and C-25 types. The prototypical member of the group, quassin, was first described in the 19th century from plants of the genus Quassia from which it gets its name. It was isolated in 1937, and its structure elucidated in 1961.

== Sources ==
More than 200 currently-known quassinoids have been isolated and identified from various species of simaroubaceae family.

Quassinoids can also be extracted from various Simaroubaceae family species such as; Ailanthus excelsa, Ailanthus vilmoriniana, (the fruits of) Brucea javanica, Hannoa klaineana, Pierreodendron kerstingii, Quassia africana, Quassia amara, (the wood of ) Picrasma ailanthoides, Picrasma javanica, Picrolemma pseudocoffea, Simaba guianensis, and Simaruba glauca.

They are found in species from American and West African genera (belonging mainly to the tribe Simaroubeae) and from the East African and Asian genera (belonging mainly to Picrasmeae and Soulameae tribes).

== Uses ==
They are a biologically potent class of natural products, possessing antimalarial, antifeedant, insecticidal, anti-inflammatory, and anticancer (or anti-leukemic) properties. The quassinoid bruceantin reached two separate phase II clinical trials in 1982 and 1983.

Other quassinoids include:

- Ailanthone
- Bruceanols
- Bruceolide
- Eurycomanone
- Gutolactone
- Isobrucein A
- Neoquassin
- Nigakihemiacetal A
- Odyendanol
- Picrasinol D
- Quassimarin
- Samaderines
- Simalikalactones (including simalikalactones A, B, C, simalikalactone D, and simalikalactone E)

== Properties and effects ==
In addition to their intensely bitter taste, quassinoids exhibit antifeedant activity against insects. An antileukemic effect has also been reported. Furthermore, numerous studies have attributed antiviral, antiparasitic (particularly antimalarial), insecticidal, amoebicidal, and anti-inflammatory properties to many quassinoids.

== Other sources ==
- Z. Guo, S. Vangapandu, R.W. Sindelar, L.A. Walker, R.D. Sindelar., Biologically active quassinoids and their chemistry: potential leads for drug design, Frontier. Med. Chem., 4 (2009), pp. 285-308
