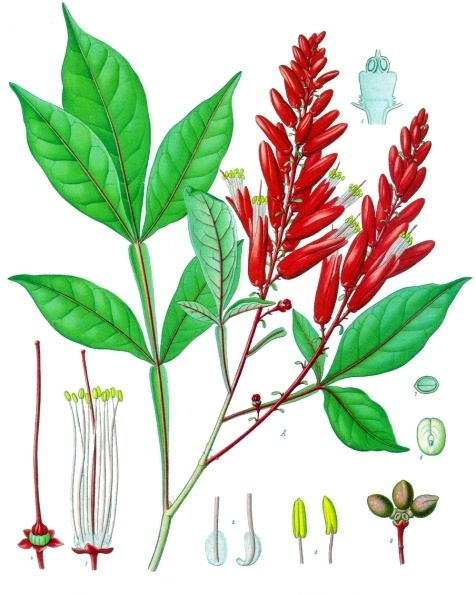
- Quassia amara from Koehler's Medicinal-Plants (1887)

Scientific classification
- Kingdom: Plantae
- Clade: Tracheophytes
- Clade: Angiosperms
- Clade: Eudicots
- Clade: Rosids
- Order: Sapindales
- Family: Simaroubaceae
- Genus: Quassia
- Species: Q. amara

Binomial name
- Quassia amara L.

Synonyms
- List: Quassia amara var. grandiflora Hemsl. in Biol. Cent.-Amer., Bot. 1: 172 (1879); Quassia amara f. paniculata (Engl.) Cronquist in Brittonia 5: 146 (1944); Quassia amara var. paniculata Engl. in C.F.P.von Martius & auct. suc. (eds.), Fl. Bras. 12(2): 207 (1874); Quassia pumila A.Rich. in J.B.G. Bory de Saint-Vincent, Dict. Class. Hist. Nat. 17: 11 (1831), nom. superfl.

= Quassia amara =

Species of tree

Quassia amara, also known as amargo, bitter-ash, bitterwood, or hombre grande (spanish for "big man") is a species in the genus Quassia, with some botanists treating it as the sole species in the genus. The genus was named by Carl Linnaeus who named it after the first botanist to describe it: the Surinamese freedman Graman Quassi. Q. amara is used as insecticide, in traditional medicine and as additive in the food industry.

== Name ==
Quassia (genus) amara (species) is an attractive small evergreen shrub or tree from the tropics and belongs to the family Simaroubaceae. Q. amara was named after Graman Quassi, a healer and botanist who showed Europeans the plant's fever treating uses.

The name amara means "bitter" in Latin and describes its very bitter taste. Q. amara contains more than thirty phytochemicals with biological activities in its tissues including the very bitter compound quassin. Therefore, it is used as an insecticide, in traditional medicine, for many diseases and as a bitter tasting additive in the food industry. All plant parts are useful for medicinal properties and the bark extracts are mainly used as flavoring in drinks but also for insecticides.

Q. amara grows wild, but can be cultivated. Trunk wood, roots, bark, stems, leaves, flowers and seeds are harvested to gain extracts of the plant. For its beauty, quassia is also grown as ornamental plant.

Quassia amara is marketed and used interchangeably with another tree species Picrasma excelsa, sharing the common name of quassia (and many of Quassia amara's constituents and uses). P. excelsa is with up to 25 m in height much taller, and occurs farther north in the tropics of Jamaica, the Caribbean, the Lesser Antilles, and northern Venezuela than Quassia amara. Also in herbal medicine in the United States and Europe very little distinction is made between these two species of trees; they are used identically and just called quassia.

=== Common names ===
It has many common names such as; Amargo, Bitter Ash, Bitterholz, Bitterwood, Bois amer, Bois de quassia, Crucete, Quassia, Cuassia, Cuachi, Fliegenholz, Guabo, Hombre grande, Jamaica bark, Kashshing, Marauba, Marupa, Palo muneco, Pau amarelo, Quassia amarga, Quassiawood, Ruda, Simaruba, Simarubabaum, Quassiaholz, Quassia de cayenne, Quassie, Quina, Simaba and Suriname wood.

== Description ==
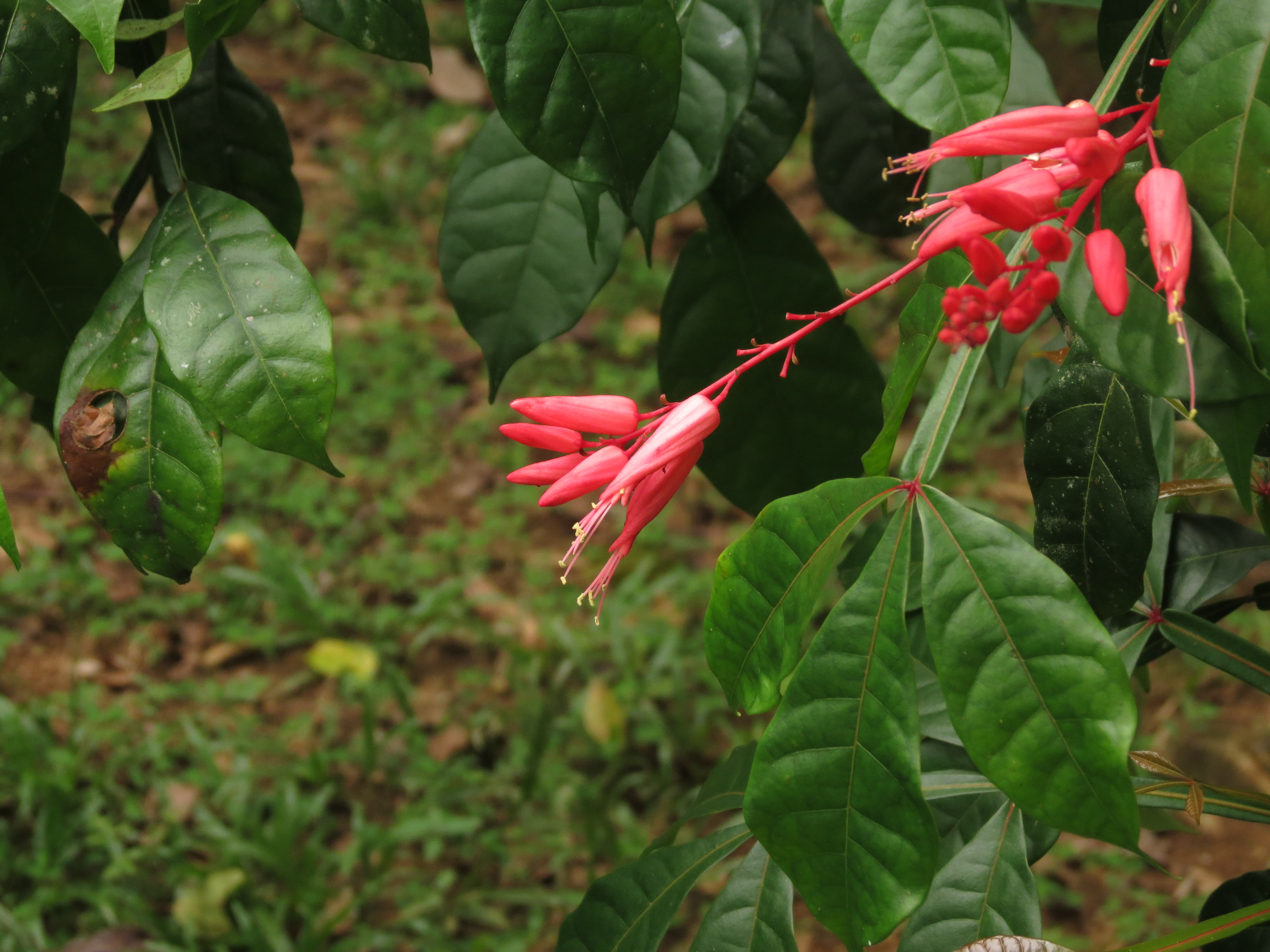
Flower

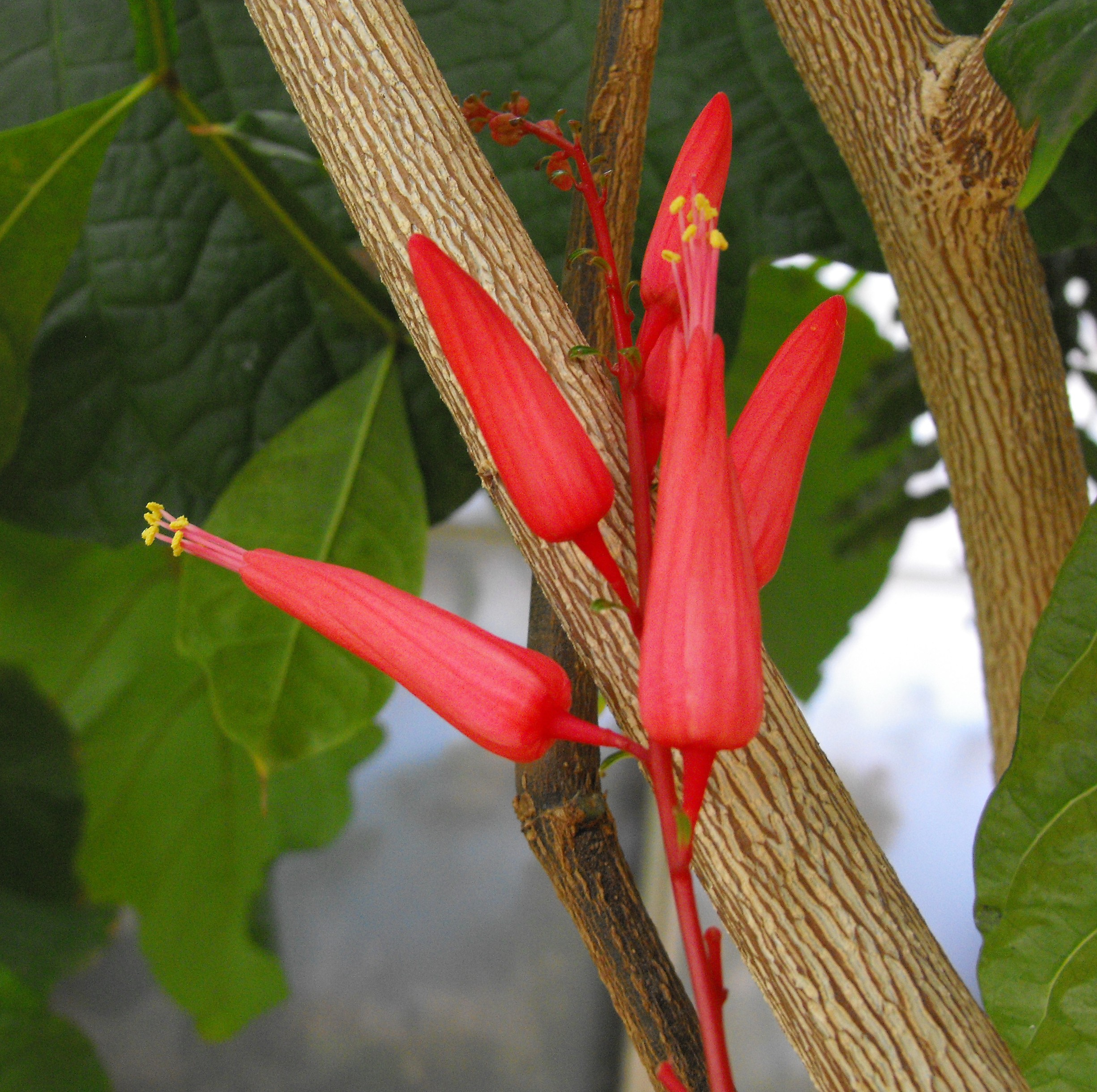
Flowers (open and close)

A small, multi-stemmed and slow growing tree with a disorderly growth twiggy limbs. It is a shrub or rarely a small tree, reaching a height up to 6 metres. The pinnate with 3-5 leaflets, deeply veined, polished alternated dark green leaves are 15–25 cm long and distinctive for their broadly winged axis and reddish veins. Leaf rachis are winged. Terminal red-branched racemes of panicles, 10–30 cm long, produces narrow, vivid crimson flowers, 2.5-3.5 cm long, that decorate the tips of each little limb. The flower comprises 5 lanceolate petals, which remain mostly closed together forming a sharpening cylinder. The flowers are produced in a panicle 15–25 cm long, each flower 2.5-3.5 cm long, bright red on the outside, and white inside. They are generally open for two days during the flowering period and each inflorescence presents on to four open flowers at once. The flowers are fragile and sometimes fall from the rachis at the slightest touch. The fruits, five small elliptic, fleshy, purple black drupes, 0.8-1.5 cm long, replace the flower and turn red as they mature. Every fruit contains one small seedling. All parts of Q. amara contain the bitter Quassimarin (plant compound).

The tree is predominately pollinated by hummingbirds but also self-compatible. Besides hummingbirds, other birds and Trigona species from the Apidea family do pollination.

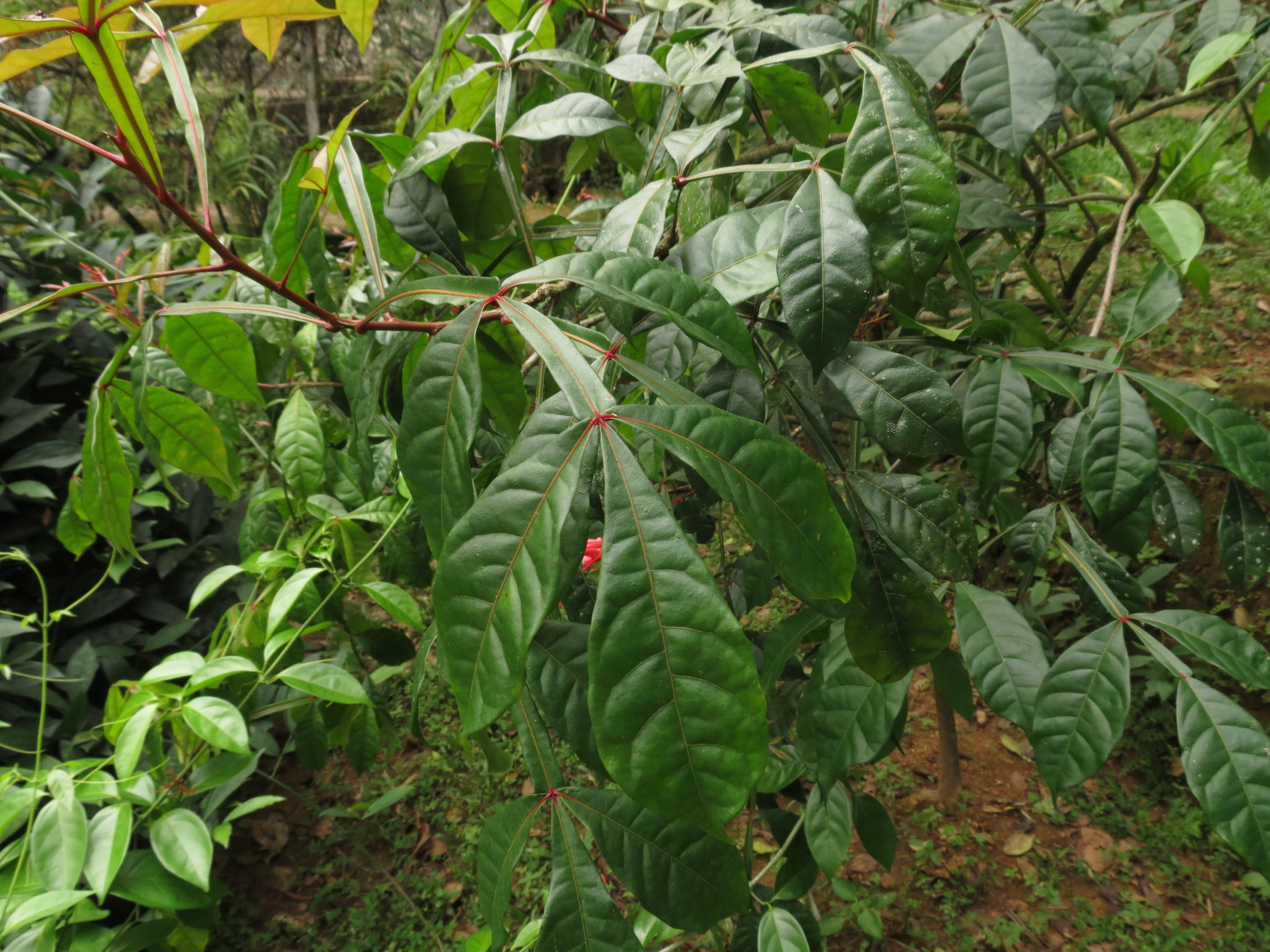
Leaf

== Taxonomy ==
The genus was first published in Carl Linnaeus's book Species Plantarum ed. 2. on page 553 in 1762.

In 1962, Dutch botanist Hans Peter Nooteboom (1934–2022) had taken a very broad view of the genus Quassia L. and included therein various genera including, Hannoa Planch., Odyendyea (Pierre) Engl., Pierreodendron Engl., Samadera Gaertn., Simaba Aubl. and Simarouba Aubl. . Then in 2007, DNA sequencing, and phylogenetic analyses was carried out on members of the Simaroubaceae family. It found that genus Samadera was a sister to Clade V and that genus Quassia was also a sister to Clade V but they had separate lineages. This suggested the splitting up of genera Quassia again, with all Nooteboom's synonyms listed above being resurrected as independent genera. This includes Samadera indica Gaertn. as the accepted name for Quassia indica. The ornamental Quassia amara L., which is occasionally planted in Singapore, remains in genus Quassia.

== Distribution ==
Quassia amara is an understorey plant in neotropic rainforests and humid sites and mostly abundant in young forests. Therefore Q. amara is native in the tropics of Southern America. More exactly in the Caribbean (Trinidad and Tobago), Central America (Costa Rica, Nicaragua, Panama), Northern South America (French Guiana, Guyana, Suriname, Venezuela, Brazil, Peru) and in Western South America (Colombia, Argentina). It is found in the Amazon Rainforest at altitudes ranging from sea level up to 900 m (3,000 ft). Q. amara is traditionally harvested in natural forests. There are reports of cultivation in other countries of Central and South America. It inhabits zones of high precipitation (1500–4500 mm per year), and may appear in dry lands or in riparian lands where there is a high humidity permanent. Q. amara is widely planted outside its native range.

== Cultivation ==
Q. amara is suitable for medium (loamy) and heavy (clay) soils. It prefers rich soils, that are water retentive. The tree can adapt to different pH-values in soils. It is a frost sensitive plant. Its salt toleration and dry toleration is low. It is classified as a semi-sciophyte with high tolerance to shade conditions but with a requirement of direct exposure to sunlight in order to complete its life cycle, in particular due to its effect on flower and fruit production. An increase in the light conditions increases flower and fruit production although it does not influence seed fertility. Therefore, its natural regeneration appears to be limited by light and interspecific competition with upperstorey forest species.

== Chemical composition ==
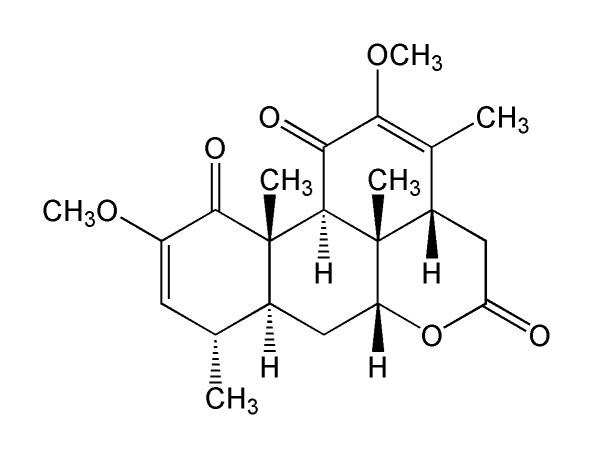
Structure of quassin

In the wood a share of 0.09 to 0.17% of quassin and 0.05 to 0.11% of neoquassin was detected in Costa Rician plants. Quassin is one of the most bitter substances found in nature.

Other identified components of bitterwood are: beta-carbolines, beta-sitostenone, beta-sitosterol, dehydroquassins, gallic acid, gentisic acid, hydroxyquassins, isoparain, isoparaines, isoquassins, malic acid, methylcanthins, methoxycanthins, methoxycantins, nigakilactone A, nor-neoquassin, parain, paraines, quassialactol, quassimarin, quassinol, quassol and simalikalactone D.

== Uses ==
=== Additive in food industry ===
The bitter principle found in the bark and wood is used as the basis of Angostura Bitters, which is used as a flavouring in longdrinks, soft drinks, digestive tonics and also in gin-based drinks. It can be used as a substitute for hops in beer manufacturing or can be added to baked goods.

=== Medicine ===
Traditionally, Q. amara is used as a digestive, to treat fever, and against hair parasites (lice, fleas) and mosquito larvae in ponds (which has not proven harmful to fish populations).

The component Simalikalactone D was identified as an antimalarial. The preparation of a tea out of young leaves is used traditionally in French Guiana. Experiments showed a high inhibition of Plasmodium yoelii yoelii and Plasmodium falciparum.

A 2012 study found a topical gel with 4% Quassia extract to be a safe and effective treatment for rosacea.

Quassia amara is part of the family of the Simaroubaceae, which contains quassinoids. Those are secondary metabolites that have a large range of biological activities. The plant is known for the active principles that can be found in its bark. They have several different effects like increasing appetite, tonic, diuretic, febrifugal, anthelmintic and anti-leukemic. It also leads to more activity from the gall bladder and has an effect against liver congestion. At external use, they act efficacy against parasites like pinworms. It is also a tribal remedy used in South America against debility, liver problems, malaria, snakebite, and back spasms. The Quassia amara is sold in the form of ground-up chips that are used to produce tonic or tinctures. Those are made by soaking the bark in the water for a long time.

==== Diabetes ====
In 2011 Husein and Gulam Mohammed, found that Q. amara extract reduced the elevated fasting blood glucose in rats. It also shows that glucose tolerance is increased by the consumption of Q. amara. According to Ferreira and al. 2013, the wood powder of Q. amara shows an anti-hyperglycemic effect, similar to the one from metformin. It could be helpful as an alternative therapy to the existing drugs that cause adverse health effects.

==== Malaria ====
Tea made with the leaves of the Q. amara, is used against malaria in the traditional medicine of French Guiana. A leaf extract from Q. amara was found to have antimalarial activity in mice. In 2006, a study found that Simalikalactone D should be responsible for the antimalarial activity. In 2009, a new quassinoid was discovered, the simalikalactone E. This molecule inhibited the growth of P. falciparum in vitro. The effect was mostly found in the gametocyte, which is the stage that is fundamental for the transmission to mosquitoes. Quassin (Q) and Neo-quassin (NQ), also were factors in stopping the effects of P. falciparum. The tea from Quassia amara has also an effect on the red blood cells counts, the packed cell count, the packed cell volume and hemoglobin concentration. It has an antianemic property.

==== Ulcers ====
Quassia amara is used in folk medicine from Costa Rica. Searchers from the University of Ibadan found a significant inhibition of the gastric ulceration induced by indomethacin. The amount of protection was between 77% and 85%. It also reduces the total gastric acidity. It was related to an increase in gastric barrier mucus and non-protein sulfhydryl groups.

==== Anti-leukemic ====
The sap of Q. amara shows in vivo significant activity against lymphocytic leukemia in mice.

==== Scalp problems ====
The bitter substances from the Q. amara attack the chitin from the lice larvae and prevent the pupping of new larvae. It also reduce dandruff when used as a hair rinse

==== Sedative properties ====
The Quassia amara bark extract has been shown to have a sedative and muscle relaxant effects.

==== Parallel medicines ====
Quassia amara is also used in traditional Indian medicine, the Ayurvedic medicine to treat rheumatism, alcoholism, dandruff, stomach problems, and worms. It is also used in the homeopatic medicine.

==== Contraindication ====
Excessive use of this plant can cause vomiting. Long term use should be avoided, as it can lead to weakness of the vision, leading towards total blindness. It should also be avoided during pregnancy and menstruation, because it may cause uterine colic. It has also shown to have negative effects on the fertility of rats, both male and females. It has been proven to reduce the weight of testis, epididymis and seminal vesicles of the rats. They also found a reduction of the epididymal sperm count, the level of testosterone, LH and FSH. These changes disappeared after some time. In female rats, a decrease of weight from the ovary and uterus was seen. There was also a decrease in the estrogen level. The litter number and weight were also reduced.

=== Insecticide ===
Insecticidal extracts of the bark were first used in the USA 1850 and 1880 in Europe.

Extracts of Quassia wood or bark act as a natural insecticide. For organic farming this is of particular interest. A good protection was shown against different insect pests (e.g. aphids, Colorado potato beetle, Anthonomus pomorum, Rhagoletis cerasi, Caterpillars of Tortricidae). Quassin extract works as a contact insecticide. Adverse effects on beneficial organisms were not found.

Quassia amara extract can be obtained by boiling Q.amara chips in water and removing the wood chips afterwards. The extract contains quassin and neoquassin, which have insecticidal properties. The extract can be used to spray fruitlets, shortly after cease blooming. Insecticidal effects are comparable to the insecticide diazinon. If the extract is sprayed before apple sawfly larvae hatched, Hoplocampa infestation can be reduced with an efficacy of 50%. Q.amara extract in the dosage corresponding to 3-4.5 kg of Q. amara wood chips for 1/ha is optimal. The bitter wood can be dried after boiling and be reused 2 to 3 times. The extract of Q.amara can be stored over half a year (e.g. spring till autumn).

Q.amara is also used as a stomach or contact insecticide against various aphids and moths, potato beetle, apple blossom veevil and thephtid fruit fly. Q.amara extract possesses antiparasitic, antibacterial, amoebacidial, antiviral and anti-inflammatory properties.

For Switzerland, a licensed formulation is available for organic farming.

==== Potential effects on human health ====
Like any poorly studied alternative chemical applied to food crops, Quassia extract may have unknown health consequences. A study on rats in 1997 found that Quassia extract significantly reduced male rats' fertility, reducing testis size, sperm quality and serum testosterone.

==== Formulation ====
Around 200 grams (7.1 oz) of Quassia wood chips are put together with 2 litres (0.44 imp gal; 0.53 US gal) of water. It is allowed to stand for 24 hours and then it is cooked for 30 min. It is then diluted with 10 to 20 litres (2.2 to 4.4 imp gal; 2.6 to 5.3 US gal) of water and used as a spray The use of approximately 3–4.5 kilograms (6.6–9.9 lb) wood extract per hectare seems to be optimal to minimize the damage of Hoplocampa testudinea on apple trees.

== Cultivation ==
Seeds and cuttings can be used for propagation of Q. amara. Frost is not tolerated, but the plant is partially drought tolerant. A large amount of indirect light is recommended. As a tropical tree, Q. amara prefers a fertile, moist but well-drained soil in a partially shaded position. Although younger trees may tolerate greater or more direct light intensities, it is recommended for the agroecological cultivation of the plant's wood, to plant Q. amara in settings that offer large amounts of indirect light.

=== Cultivation management ===
The older the plant, the greater the accumulation of quassinoids in the xylem. Cultivation conditions, in the shade or in the sun, influences notably the amount of quassine accumulated by the plants. This factor will have to be taken into account to achieve a good harvest. Controlled luminosity conditions favor plant growth and the concentration of quassinoids in the tissues, which increases the quality of the raw material. Organic fertilizer such as deep or organic mulch can be used as nutritional compounds.

=== Reproduction ===
In Costa Rica the flowering period of Q.amara arises between October and April, whereas in central Panama the flowering period occurs from October to January. The fruits ripen after two months. In February and early March, there is a peak of fruit ripening. The drupes show different colors during the ripening process. They turn from reddish to green until the reach a black color. The best germination results were obtained with seeds from drupes that are just before becoming totally black. Not only the color but also the size of the fruits are indicators for the viability of a seed. Fruits with a size between 1 and 1.5 cm are suitable for reproduction and they can be easily detached from the receptacle.

The treelet can be propagated sexual by seeds or asexual by vegetative cuttings of half-ripe wood. The trees can be cultivated in tree nurseries. Therefore seeds can be sowed of substrat such as sawdust, sand or soil. The seedlings are grown up for eight months until they reach a height around 40 cm. The germination occurs within 10 weeks. During the germination period daily watering is important. A distance of 10 x 15 cm at a density of 35 plants per m is recommended in tree nurseries.

=== Pests and diseases ===
Cutting insects were found in seedlings, but no critical damage was observed. The fungus Colletotrichum sp. caused anthracnosis in young plants, what leads to brown leaf changes surrounded by a yellowish halo, defoliation and suspension of plant growth. High soil moisture, inadequate soil drainage, high sowing density and bad weed control management are factors that enhances this fungal disease. It can be controlled with specific funigcides. Bacteria infection is scarce, but has to be taken into account during the transplantation.
