= Samadera harmandiana =

Scientific classification
- Kingdom: Plantae
- Clade: Embryophytes
- Clade: Tracheophytes
- Clade: Angiosperms
- Clade: Eudicots
- Clade: Rosids
- Order: Sapindales
- Family: Simaroubaceae
- Genus: Samadera
- Species: S. harmandiana

Binomial name
- Samadera harmandiana (Pierre ex Laness.) Noot.

Synonyms
- Locandi harmandii Pierre in Fl. Forest. Cochinch.: t. 261 (1892); Quassia harmandiana (Pierre ex Laness.) Noot. in Blumea 11: 518 (1963); Samadera harmandii (Pierre) Engl. in H.G.A.Engler & K.A.E.Prantl, Nat. Pflanzenfam. 3(4): 210 (1896)

Species of plant from Southeast Asia

Samadera harmandiana (syn Quassia harmandiana) is a freshwater mangrove shrub or small tree in the Simaroubaceae family. It is found in Cambodia, Laos and Vietnam. The wood provides firewood. Certain fish eat the poisonous fruit

== Description ==
This species grows as a shrub or small tree, some 5–8 m (16.4–26.2 ft) tall.

The species was placed in the section Samadera by Noteboom in 1962, along with Quassia indica. The plants of this section have simple leaves with roughly scattered concave glands, mostly on the under surface. The flowers are bisexual, occurring in axillary or terminal inflorescences, either pseudoumbels with peduncles or in racemes. There are 3–5 calyx lobes, these are imbricate in the bud, obtuse and have a concave gland in the centre. There are 3–5 contorted petals, much longer than the calyx, usually hairy on the underside. The disc is large, as high as it is broad, and gynophore-like. The style has an inconspicuous terminal stigma. The quite large fruits are compressed laterally, with a narrow, thinner, sharp-edged part in the apex half. Quassia harmandiana fruit are very large and dorsoventrally compressed. It flowers from March to May and fruits in July. The fruit are poisonous, see below.

== Taxonomy ==
It was first published by Jean Baptiste Louis Pierre based on an earlier description by Jean Marie Antoine de Lanessan in Pl. Util. Col. Franç. on page 305 in 1886.

The specific epithet name of Harmandiana is in honour of Julien Herbert Auguste Jules Harmand (1844-1915), who was a French clergyman and botanist (Mycology and Lichenology).

The species was later placed in the section Samadera of the Simaroubaceae by Dutch botanist Hans Peter Nooteboom (1934–2022) in 1962 (published in 1963), as Quassia harmandiana, along with Quassia indica. Nooteboom had taken a very broad view of the genus Quassia L. and included therein various genera including, Hannoa Planch., Odyendyea (Pierre) Engl., Pierreodendron Engl., Samadera Gaertn., Simaba Aubl. and Simarouba Aubl.

In 2007, DNA sequencing, and phylogenetic analyses was carried out on members of the Simaroubaceae family. It found that genus Samadera was a sister to Clade V and that genus Quassia was also a sister to Clade V but they had separate lineages. This suggested the splitting up of genera Quassia again, with all Nooteboom's synonyms listed above being resurrected as independent genera.

It was later returned to genus Samadera as Samadera harmandiana in 2007.

=== Vernacular names ===
Krahs and kra: (Khmer) are names used in Cambodia. Mak ngooan is a name from Laos.

== Distribution ==
The species grows in the following countries: Cambodia, Laos and Vietnam.

== Habitat, ecology ==
The plant grows in the mangrove and back-mangrove formations of the Mekong and Tonle Sap rivers and lake.

In the vegetation communities alongside the Mekong in Kratie and Steung Treng Provinces, Cambodia, this taxa is moderately abundant in the dense diverse strand community (last to be flooded each year, first to drain). It also occurs in mixed evergreen and deciduous forests in the area. It grows on soils derived from metamorphic sandstone bedrock, at altitudes of 25–30 m (82–98 ft) above sea level.

In the Khone Falls section of the Mekong, in southern Laos, close to where the river becomes fully Cambodian, two species of carp-like fish, Leptobarbus hoevenii and Tor cf. tambra eat the fruits of this species. The flesh of these fish is rendered poisonous after eating this and other fruit. In Tor cf. tambra the eyes become red and scales become whiter if poison is present, and if recognised, then the fish can be made edible by discarding the head and guts, then dried in the sun or marinated.

== Uses ==
The wood makes excellent firewood. The plant contains bactericidal compounds.

== Other sources ==
- Dy Phon, P. (2000). Dictionnaire des plantes utilisées au Cambodge: 1-915. chez l'auteur, Phnom Penh, Cambodia. (as Quassia harmandiana)
- Lê, T.C. (2003). Danh lục các loài thục vật Việt Nam [Checklist of Plant Species of Vietnam] 3: 1-1248. Hà Noi : Nhà xu?t b?n Nông nghi?p.
- Newman, M., Ketphanh, S., Svengsuksa, B., Thomas, P., Sengdala, K., Lamxay, V. & Armstrong, K. (2007). A checklist of the vascular plants of Lao PDR: 1-394. Royal Botanic Gardens, Edinburgh. (as Samadera harmandiana)
