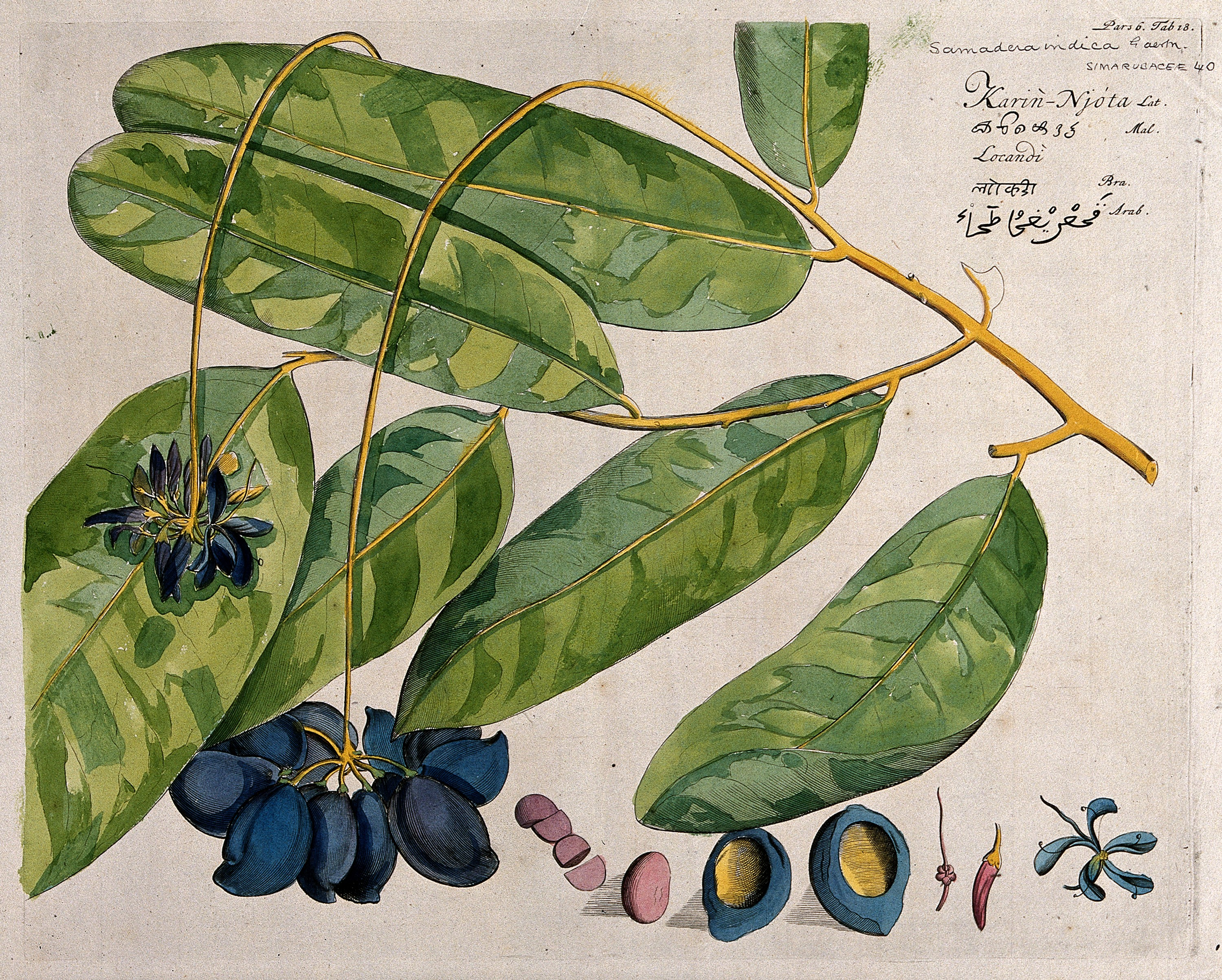

Scientific classification
- Kingdom: Plantae
- Clade: Tracheophytes
- Clade: Angiosperms
- Clade: Eudicots
- Clade: Rosids
- Order: Sapindales
- Family: Simaroubaceae
- Genus: Samadera
- Species: S. indica

Binomial name
- Samadera indica Gaertn.

Synonyms
- List: Locandi glandulifera (C.Presl) Pierre in Fl. Forest. Cochinch.: t. 262 (1892); Locandi indica (Gaertn.) Kuntze in Revis. Gen. Pl. 1: 104 (1891); Locandi lucida (Wall.) Kuntze in Revis. Gen. Pl. 1: 104 (1891); Locandi madagascariensis (A.Juss.) Kuntze in Revis. Gen. Pl. 1: 104 (1891); Locandi mekongensis Pierre in Fl. Forest. Cochinch.: t. 263 (1892); Locandi merguensis Pierre in Fl. Forest. Cochinch.: t. 262 (1892); Locandi pendula (Blanco) Pierre in Fl. Forest. Cochinch.: t. 262 (1892); Manungala pendula Blanco in Fl. Filip.: 306 (1837); Niota commersonii Pers. in Syn. Pl. 1: 416 (1805); Niota lamarkiana Blume in Bijdr. Fl. Ned. Ind.: 251 (1825), nom. superfl.; Niota lucida Wall. in Pl. Asiat. Rar. 2: t. 168 (1831); Niota pendula Sm. in A.Rees, Cycl. 25: [s.p.] (1819), nom. superfl.; Niota pentapetala Poir. in J.B.A.M.de Lamarck, Encycl. 4: 490 (1798); Niota tetrapetala Poir. in J.B.A.M.de Lamarck, Encycl. 4: 490 (1798); Quassia indica (Gaertn.) Noot. in Blumea 11: 517 (1963); Quassia indica var. lucida (Wall.) Blatt. in Kirtikar & Basu, Ind. Med. Pl. 1: 509 (1935); Quassia indica var. papuava Lauterb. in Bot. Jahrb. Syst. 56: 342 (1920); Samadera brevipetala Scheff. in Natuurk. Tijdschr. Ned.-Indië 32: 410 (1871); Samadera glandulifera C.Presl in Symb. Bot. (Pragae) 2: 1 (1834); Samadera indica var. brevipetala (Scheff.) Backer in Fl. Batavia: 258 (1907); Samadera indica var. lucida (Wall.) Kurz in J. Asiat. Soc. Bengal, Pt. 2, Nat. Hist. 44: 136 (1876); Samadera lucida (Wall.) Voigt in Hort. Suburb. Calcutt.: 182 (1845); Samadera madagascariensis A.Juss. in Mém. Mus. Hist. Nat. 12: 516 (1825); Samadera mekongensis (Pierre) Engl. in H.G.A.Engler & K.A.E.Prantl, Nat. Pflanzenfam. 3(4): 210 (1896); Samadera pentapetala (Poir.) G.Don in Gen. Hist. 1: 811 (1831); Samadera tetrapetala (Poir.) G.Don in Gen. Hist. 1: 811 (1831); Simaba indica (Gaertn.) Baill. in Hist. Pl. 4: 440 (1873); Vitmannia elliptica Vahl in Symb. Bot. 3: 51 (1794); Vitmannia lucida (Wall.) Steud. in Nomencl. Bot., ed. 2, 2: 779 (1841)

= Samadera indica =

Species of plant

Samadera indica (syn. Quassia indica), the bitter wood or Niepa bark tree, is a species of plant in the family Simaroubaceae. It is a shrub or tree and grows primarily in wet tropical regions, from west Africa, through India, then down through Indonesia to Malesia.

It is used in folklore medicine in various Asian countries as well to treat various ailments such as malaria, fevers, rheumatism, bruises, skin conditions and others conditions. The leaves are used as insecticides against termites, and the wood is used for knife handles.

== Description ==
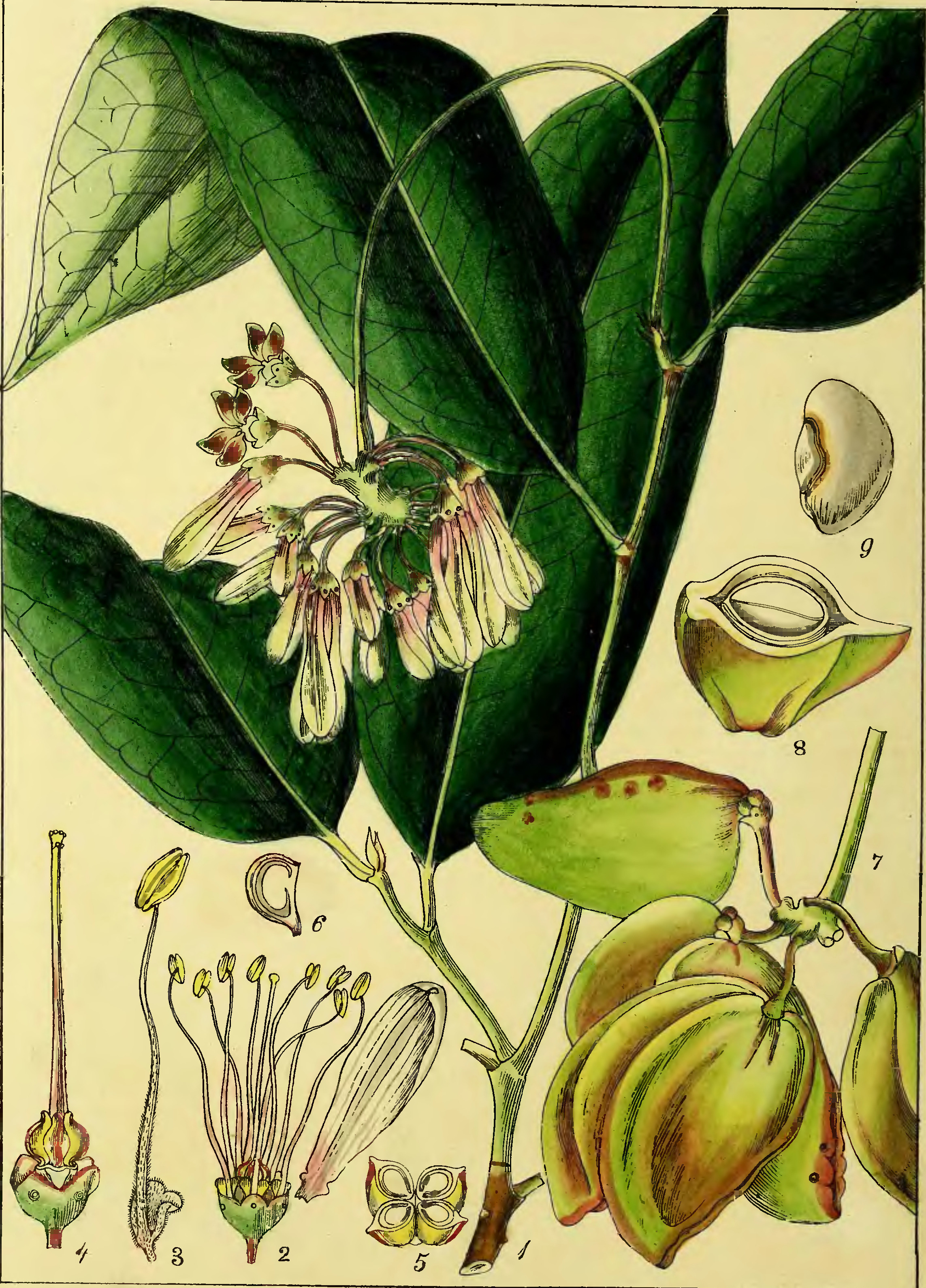
Botanical illustration of Samadera indica.

Samadera indica is an evergreen tree or shrub, that can grow up to 10 m (32.8 ft) tall, or 20 m (65.6 ft) tall.

It has pale yellow bark, which is transversely cracked. There is no heartwood, and the bark has small pores, the medullary rays are very fine, uniform and closely packed. It has stout branches, which are glabrous (hairless). It is 3–10 mm (0.1–0.4 in), with elliptic-oblong, glabrous, shining leaves which are reticulately nerved. They are about 20 centimeters wide. The petioles are 1–2 cm long and stout. Leaves simple, elliptic, ovate or obovate, 5–25 cm long, 2–8.5 cm wide, rounded to acuminate at apex, rounded or obtuse at base, glabrous, glandular beneath, densely reticulate-veined; petiole 7–15(–30) mm, often curved.

The flowers are usually 20 or more in umbelliform glabrous or puberulous inflorescences. The peduncles are 7–30 cm long, stout, flat, thick-above; pedicels 1 to 3 cm, jointed at base; bracts minute. Petals are 4 in number and 0.5 cm, and are white, pale yellow, or purplish. The flowers bisexual, the calyx 4-lobed They flower all year.

The drupes appear 1-4 together, and are flat, smooth, glandular, and reticulate. Samadera indica has fruit of 1–4 carpels, each a woody drupe, ellipsoid with a unilateral thin wing in the upper part. They are 4–6 cm long, 2.5–3.7 cm wide, and 1.3–1.9 cm thick, with 1 large, brown seed. Fruits are grouped in whorls of 1-4 carpels, and are green blotched red, ovoid, and flattened.

The seeds have thin testa, absent endosperm, and plano-convex cotyledons, measuring up to 3.5 cm by 2.5 cm large.

== Taxonomy ==
=== Vernacular names ===
It has several English common names such as; Niepa bark tree, Bitter wood, and Rangoon creeper. Although Rangoon Creeper name is more used for the vine Combretum indicum.

Depending on the country and language, it is also known as various names such as; in Hindi as लोखंडी and Lokhandi, in Kannada as ನೀಪಾ and Nipa, samdera, or Kaduhonge, in Malayalam as Karinghota, കര്ംഗൊടാ Karinjotta, Karingota, Karingotta, or Njotta. In Malaysian it is Manuggal, in Marathi as लोखंडी and Lokhandi, in Sanskrit as गुच्छकरंजः and Gucchakaranjah, or Lokhandi. In Sinhalese, known as Samadera. In Spanish, known as Simaruba de Madagascar. In Tamil as karincottai, நீபம் or Nibam, and நீபா Nipa. In Telugu as Lokanti.

On the Micronesian islands (such as Caroline Island), it is known as eskeam or etkeam. The wood is known as kathai in Burma.

In Indonesia as gateph pait (Bangka), sahangi (Minahasa) lani (Ambon). In Malaysia as kayu pahit (Peninsular), kelapahit (Murut, Sabah), manuggal (Iban, Sarawak). In Papua New Guinea as tosi (Delena, Central Province). In the Philippines, it is known as Manunggal, (Tagalog, Bikol, Bisaya).

=== Publishing ===
The botanic name of Samadera indica was first published and described by German Botanist Joseph Gaertner (1732–1791) in his seminal book De Fructibus et Seminibus Plantarum vol.2 on page 352 in 1791.

The specific epithet "indica" refers to India, the country where this species was first observed.

The species was later placed in the section Samadera of the Simaroubaceae by Hans Peter Nooteboom (1934–2022) in 1962 (published in 1963), as Quassia indica, along with Quassia harmandiana. Nooteboom had taken a very broad view of the genus Quassia L. and included therein various genera including, Hannoa Planch., Odyendyea (Pierre) Engl., Pierreodendron Engl., Samadera Gaertn., Simaba Aubl. and Simarouba Aubl..

In 2007, DNA sequencing, and phylogenetic analyses was carried out on members of the Simaroubaceae family. It found that genus Samadera was a sister to Clade V and that genus Quassia was also a sister to Clade V but they had separate lineages. This suggested the splitting up of genera Quassia again, with all Nooteboom's synonyms listed above being resurrected as independent genera.

It was later returned to genus Samadera as Samadera indica in 2008, but it is still known as Quassia indica in many places. The woody and floating nature of the Samadera indica fruit explains how the species was able to be widespread across its distribution range.

== Distribution ==
Samadera indica is native to the countries (and regions) of Africa (within Tanzania, Pemba Island, Comoros and Madagascar), tropical Asia, (within India, Bangladesh and Sri Lanka,), Indo-China (within Andaman Islands, Cambodia, Laos, Myanmar, and Vietnam), Indonesia, Malesia (within Borneo, Malaya, Philippines, Sulawesi and Sumatra), Papuasia (within Bismarck Archipelago, New Guinea, Solomon Islands), and the Pacific islands (Caroline Islands and Vanuatu).

It is not found on Java and the Lesser Sunda Islands. It is also listed as native to the island of Singapore.

== Habitat ==
Samadera indica is found in forests at low altitudes, within moist deciduous forests, and evergreen forests. Such as India, it is mostly found in evergreen forest of Western Ghats (mountain range), It is also found in mixed dipterocarp forests.

It is also found along backwaters, or peat-based, tidal, swamp forests, or periodically inundated forests, and along river shore.

In Singapore, it is found in tidal swamp forests and on the edge of Mangrove forests.

It is found at an altitude of up to 150–200 m (490–660 ft) above sea level.

It can be growing on alluvial sites with sandy soils, but also found on limestone.

== Endangered ==
Samadera indica has been assessed for the IUCN Red List of Threatened Species in 2019. Under its synonym, Quassia indica is listed as least concern (LC).

It is listed as critically endangered (CR) in Singapore, and it is listed in Sri Lanka as near threatened (NT).

== Cultivation ==
It can be cultivated for use in parks or gardens, due to its attractive foliage, fruits and general form. It can grow in well-drained soils or can tolerate moist soils. In positions in full sun and needs watering as much as generally any other shrub. It can be propagated by seed.

== Uses ==
=== Medicinal uses ===
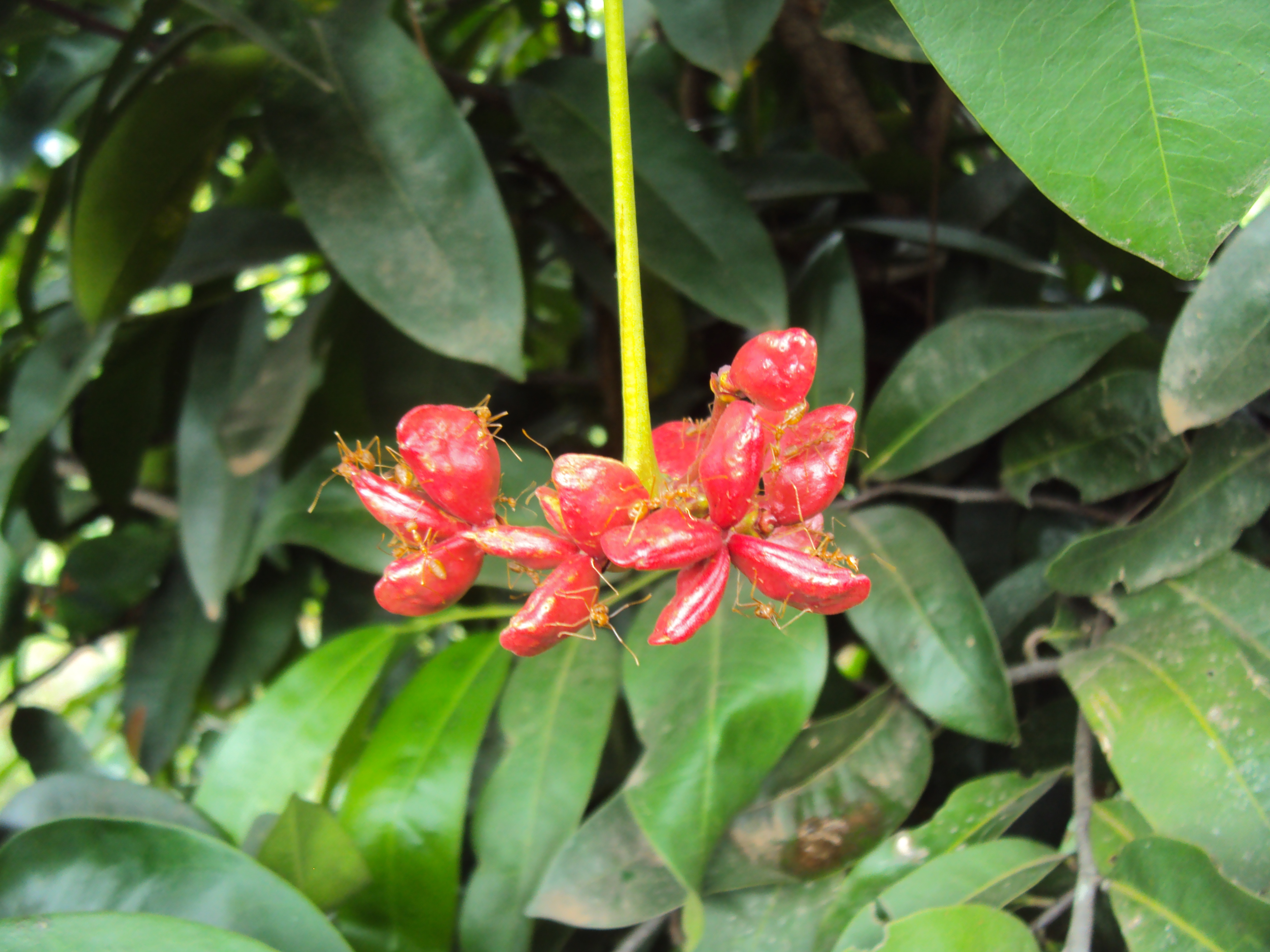
Fruit (seed capsules) of Samadera indica (syn. Quassia indica)

Parts of the Samadera indica tree are gathered from the wild and are used medicinally in local folk medicines in several countries.

Phytochemical analysis and antimicrobial evaluation of extracts from bark and leaf of Samadera indica a medicinal plant used in traditional healing owing to its analgestic, antiinflammatory, antifeedant and antimicrobial properties.

In the Congo, Africa and on Madagascar, it is used to treat malaria.

In Sri Lanka, a mixture of powdered bark or wood scrapings in warm water or coconut oil used to treated fever. The roasted seeds are pounded and applied to areas of rheumatism. The bruised leaves are applied over skin eruptions. The seeds are worn around the neck to help prevent asthma.

In Ayurvedic health system, the drug Guchakaranja is derived from Samadera indica. It is also known as Karinjotta in Kerala, India. In the state of Kerala in India, species Samadera indica was found to have anti-tumor effects, antifeedant, phytotoxic, antiviral, anthelmintic, and anti-malarial activities, growth regulating activities, and antioxidant, and antimicrobial activities.

It was used in India to vitiate (breakdown) diseases such as vata, kapha, arthritis, constipation, and also skin diseases like leprosy, scabies, pruritus, and erysipelas. In India, the bark is also used in the treatment of fevers. The oil from the seeds is applied externally on rheumatic joints, and used as a liniment on bruises.

It is a medicinal plant in Myanmar.

In Burma and Indonesia, the seeds are used externally to treat rheumatism.

In Indonesia, the bark, wood, and seeds serve as a febrifuge (substance that reduces fever) and also a tonic, and a decoction is prescribed for bilious fever. The seed, can be chewed or ground with water, is both emetic and purgative, and an oil from the seeds is a constituent in an embrocation for rheumatism. The leaves are crushed and applied to erysipelas (a skin infection).

In the Philippines, the bark and wood, are macerated in water, alcohol, or wine which is then said to have tonic, stomachic, anticholeric, antifebrile, and emmenagogue properties (used to stimulate blood flow in the pelvic area and uterus). The juice from the pounded bark serves as a treatment for skin diseases, and the bark, scraped or powdered, is given in water or oil to treat "malignant fever". In the Solomon Islands, water from the macerated bark is drunk as a remedy for constipation. Also the macerated leaves are mixed with coconut oil are applied to the hair to kill lice, and an infusion of the seeds is utilized as a antipyretic (substance that reduces fever).

==== Chemical composition ====
All parts of the plant contain the glucoside called samaderin which is a bitter substance.

The extracts were evaluated for antimicrobial effect using two strains of bacteria – Escherichia coli and Staphylococcus aureus and two species of fungi – Aspergillus niger and Candida albicans. As well as bacteria species Pseudomonas aeruginosa.

Quassinoids can be extracted from Samadera indica, from the bark, and seeds. Such as Samaderines A and E, which have been isolated from Samadera indica. Samaderines B and C were found in 2004, isolated from the seed kernels. Quassinoid - Brucin D showed activity against Walker's carcinoma. While Samaderine E exhibited anti-leukaemic activity. Quassinoids may have potential in drug formulations.

A methanolic extract of Samadera indica can be used to treat skin diseases.

Triterpenes Lupenone and 18α-Oleanan-19α-ol-3-one have been found in Samadera indica.

It also contains triterpenoids, an anti-fungal compound.

Essential oils have been isolated by steam distillation of flower and flower stalks of Samadera indica.

=== Insecticide uses ===
It is also used to produce insecticides. An infusion of the leaves, or a decoction of the leaves is used to kill termites (or white ants). Especially in the Congo and Madagascar.

Various extracts, including Samadera indica leaf extracts have shown to significantly decrease the reproduction ability of mosquitoes and also the hatchability of their eggs, in species such as Culex quinquefasciatus, Anopheles stephensi and Aedes aegypti.

=== Other uses ===
The macerated leaves, are mixed with coconut oil, then applied to the hair for cleansing purposes.

The pale yellow wood is light and soft. The wood of the tree is used locally for example in the state of Sarawak in Malaysia, where it is used for making knife-handles, such as parang handles.

The seeds of the plant contain about 33% oil, but it is thought difficult to get a sufficient supply of the oil for commercial use.

In Singapore, it is used as an ornamental plant and planted in parks and gardens. It also cultivated in Myanmar.
