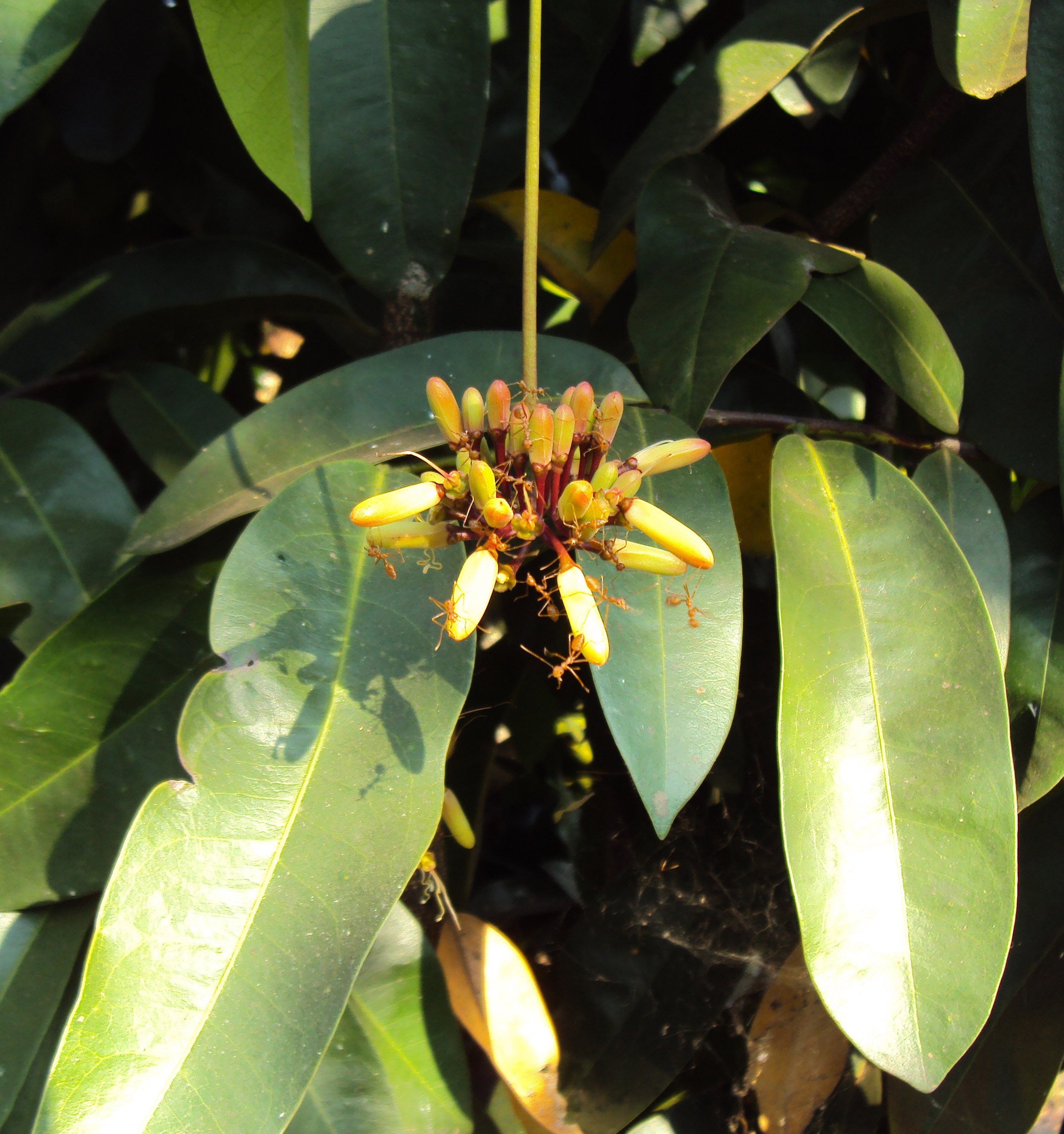
- Flowers of Samadera indica

Scientific classification
- Kingdom: Plantae
- Clade: Embryophytes
- Clade: Tracheophytes
- Clade: Angiosperms
- Clade: Eudicots
- Clade: Rosids
- Order: Sapindales
- Family: Simaroubaceae
- Genus: Samadera; Gaertn.

Type species
- Samadera indica Gaertn.

Synonyms
- Biporeia Thouars; Hyptiandra Hook.f.; Locandi Adans.; Manungala Blanco; Mauduita Comm. ex DC.; Niota Lam.; Samandura L. ex Baill.; Vitmannia Vahl

= Samadera =

Genus of flowering plant

Samadera is a genus of four species of plants belonging to the family Simaroubaceae in the order Sapindales. Its natural range is from eastern Africa through tropical Asia to northern and eastern Australia and the western Pacific.

== Description ==
Plants in this genus are shrubs or small trees. Leaves are alternate, undivided, glabrous (hairless), with entire margins. Stipules are absent. The flowers are bisexual, with 3 to 5 sepals and petals, and are produced in axillary or terminal pseudo-umbels. There are 8–10 stamens, each with a small scale or appendage at the base. The disc is fleshy, glabrous, and conical or cylindrical. The stigma is stellate (star-shaped) or capitate and the ovules are solitary and pendulous. The fruit consists of 1-5 large dry compressed 1 seeded drupe-like mericarps.

== Taxonomy ==
It was first published and described by German Botanist Joseph Gaertner (1732–1791) in his seminal book De Fructibus et Seminibus Plantarum vol.2 on page 352 in 1791.

The species was later placed in the section Samadera of the Simaroubaceae by Hans Peter Nooteboom (1934–2022) in 1962 (published in 1963), as Quassia indica, along with Samadera harmandiana as Quassia harmandiana. Nooteboom had taken a very broad view of the genus Quassia L. and included therein various genera including, Hannoa Planch., Odyendyea (Pierre) Engl., Pierreodendron Engl., Samadera Gaertn., Simaba Aubl. and Simarouba Aubl. .

In 2007, DNA sequencing, and phylogenetic analyses was carried out on members of the Simaroubaceae family. It found that genus Samadera was a sister to Clade V and that genus Quassia was also a sister to Clade V but they had separate lineages. This suggested the splitting up of genera Quassia again, with all Nooteboom's synonyms listed above being resurrected as independent genera. This includes Samadera indica Gaertn. as the accepted name for Quassia indica. The ornamental Quassia amara L., which is occasionally planted in Singapore, remains in genus Quassia.

It is listed as a possible synonym of Quassia L. by GRIN (United States Department of Agriculture and the Agricultural Research Service).

=== Etymology ===
The genus name Samadera is derived from the Sinhalese word samadarā, "a tree of Ceylon" [sic].

== Species ==
The genus has four accepted species as of August 2026. A number of undescribed and potentially new species occur in Australia.

Current species

- Samadera baileyana Oliv. – Queensland, Australia
- Samadera bidwillii (Benth. & Hook.f.) Oliv. – Queensland
- Samadera harmandiana Pierre ex Laness. – Cambodia, Laos and Vietnam
- Samadera indica Gaertn. – east Africa to the western Pacific

== Distribution ==
It is native to the following regions as defined in the World Geographical Scheme for Recording Plant Distributions:

- East Tropical Africa – Tanzania
- Western Indian Ocean – Comoros, Madagascar
- Indian Subcontinent – Bangladesh, India, Sri Lanka
- Indo-China – Andaman Islands, Cambodia, Laos, Myanmar, Vietnam
- Malesia – Borneo, Malaya, Philippines, Sulawesi, Sumatera
- Papuasia – Bismarck Archipelago, New Guinea, Solomon Islands
- Australia – New South Wales, Queensland
- Northwestern Pacific – Caroline Islands
- Southwestern Pacific – Vanuatu

== Habitat ==
Samadera indica for example, occurs in lowland tropical forest and peat swamp forest. at an altitude of 200 m (660 ft) above sea level.

While Samadera bidwillii is commonly found in Queensland, Australia within lowland rainforest often with species Araucaria cunninghamii or on the edges of rain-forests, but it can also be found in other forest types, such as open forest and woodland, it is commonly found in areas adjacent to both temporary and permanent watercourses. At an altitude of 510 m (1,670 ft) above sea level.

== Conservation ==
Samadera indica (Quassia indica) was assessed for the IUCN Red List of Threatened Species in 2019. Samadera indica is listed as least concern (LC).

Samadera bidwillii is listed in Australia as vulnerable under the Environment Protection and Biodiversity Conservation Act 1999 and vulnerable under the Queensland Nature Conservation Act 1992. Due to threats to its habitat, such as clearing as a result of a range of activities including agriculture, forestry, urban development and recreational activities. The spread of non-native species such as lantana (Lantana camara) and exotic grasses, including guinea grass (Megathyrsus maximus) and Rhodes grass (Chloris gayana), may also threaten populations of Samadera bidwillii.

== Uses ==
Some species such as Samadera indica are gathered from the wild and are used medicinally in local folk medicines and also used to produce insecticides. The wood of the tree is used locally for example in the state of Sarawak in Malaysia, where it is used for making knife-handles.

In the state of Kerala, India species Samadera indica has found to have anti-tumor, antifeedant, phytotoxic, antiviral, anthelmintic, and anti-malarial activities, growth regulating activities, and antioxidant, and antimicrobial activities. It was used to vitiate diseases such as vata, kapha, arthritis, constipation, and skin diseases like leprosy, scabies, pruritus, and erysipelas.

A methanolic extract of Samadera indica can be used to treat skin diseases.
