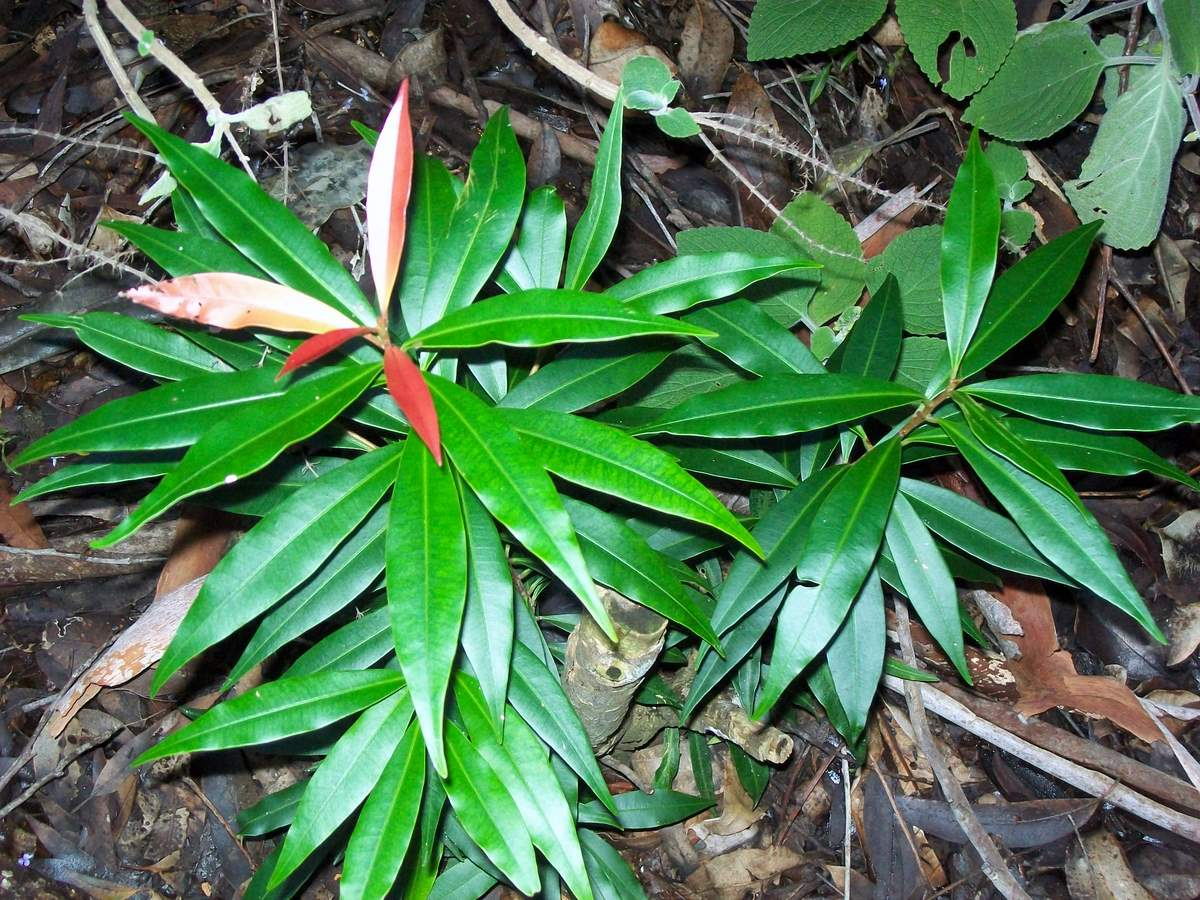

Scientific classification
- Kingdom: Plantae
- Clade: Tracheophytes
- Clade: Angiosperms
- Clade: Eudicots
- Clade: Rosids
- Order: Sapindales
- Family: Simaroubaceae
- Genus: Quassia
- Species: Q. sp. 'Mount Nardi'

Binomial name
- Quassia sp. 'Mount Nardi'

Synonyms
- Samadera sp. Mt Nardi (B.L.Walker AQ330746): Quassia sp. A sensu Harden (1991); Quassia sp. 2 (Mt Nardi sp.'A' * A.G.Floyd 1198); Quassia sp. aff. bidwillii sensu Floyd; Hyptiandra bidwillii Hook.f.; Samadera bidwilli (Hook.f.) Oliv.; Quassia sp. aff. bidwillii Hook.f. Noot.

= Quassia sp. 'Mount Nardi' =

Species of flowering plant

Quassia sp. 'Mount Nardi' is a plant found in north eastern New South Wales, Australia. An uncommon to rare plant, it is yet to be formally named. The original specimen was collected at Mount Nardi, not far from Nimbin, Australia.

It grows below rainforest, in high rainfall areas. Often found at altitudes around 650 metres above sea level, on soils based on rhyolite or basalt. It grows between Dorrigo in the south to the Tweed River in the north.

A bush up to 5 metres tall with a stem diameter of 10 cm. Often seen with two or more stems. Leaves are smooth edged, 8 to 16 cm long and 1.5 to 3 cm wide. A fairly dull green above and yellow green below the leaf. The midrib vein is darker on the bottom side, but paler above. An intramarginal leaf vein is parallel to the edge of the leaf, starting from the termination of the lateral leaf veins. Reddish/green flowers form on slender stalks, from July to February. The fruit is an attractive orange or red drupe, 15 to 20 mm long. Germination from fresh seed can take up to six months, but some seeds will germinate within three weeks.
