= Simaba borneensis =

Conservation status
- Least Concern (IUCN 3.1)

Scientific classification
- Kingdom: Plantae
- Clade: Tracheophytes
- Clade: Angiosperms
- Clade: Eudicots
- Clade: Rosids
- Order: Sapindales
- Family: Simaroubaceae
- Genus: Simaba
- Species: S. borneensis

Binomial name
- Simaba borneensis (Noot.) Feuillet

Synonyms
- Quassia borneensis Noot.

Species of flowering plant

Simaba borneensis is a plant in the family Simaroubaceae. It is native to Borneo and Sumatra.

== Description ==
Simaba borneensis grows as a tree up to 25 m (80 ft) tall with a trunk diameter of 25 cm (10 in), with buttresses. The leaves are oblong or obovate to elliptic and measure up to 12 cm (5 in) long and up to 4.5 cm (1.8 in) wide. The inflorescences are puberulous. The ellispoid fruits are purplish-red and measure up to 3 cm (1.2 in) in diameter.

== Taxonomy ==
Simaba borneensis was first described as Quassia borneensis in 1963 by the Dutch botanist Hans Peter Nooteboom in Flora Malesiana. In 1983, the French botanist Christian Patrice Georges-André Feuillet transferred the species to the genus Simaba. The type specimen was collected in Sabah in Borneo. The specific epithet borneensis refers to Borneo.

== Distribution and habitat ==
Simaba borneensis is native to Sumatra and Borneo, where it is widely found. Its habitat is in lowland primary dipterocarp forests, occasionally in kerangas forests.

== Conservation ==
Simaba borneensis has been assessed as least concern on the IUCN Red List. The species is broadly distributed. However, it is threatened by deforestation and by conversion of land for agriculture and plantations. The species is not present in any protected areas.
