= Hannoa kitombetombe =

Conservation status
- Vulnerable (IUCN 2.3)

Scientific classification
- Kingdom: Plantae
- Clade: Tracheophytes
- Clade: Angiosperms
- Clade: Eudicots
- Clade: Rosids
- Order: Sapindales
- Family: Simaroubaceae
- Genus: Hannoa
- Species: H. kitombetombe

Binomial name
- Hannoa kitombetombe G.C.C.Gilbert

Species of flowering plant

Hannoa kitombetombe is a species of plant in the Simaroubaceae family. It is endemic to the Democratic Republic of the Congo. It is threatened by habitat loss.
