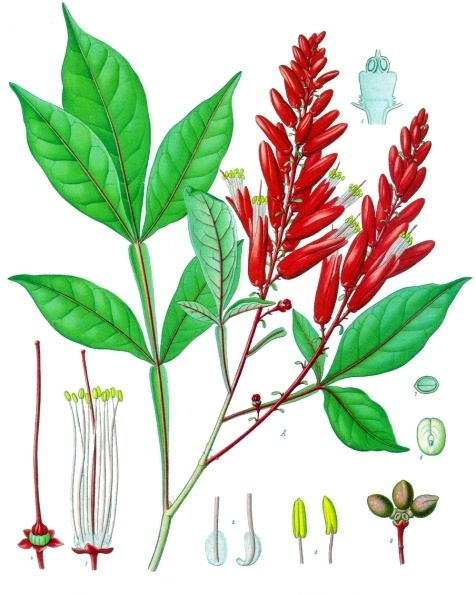
- Quassia amara

Scientific classification
- Kingdom: Plantae
- Clade: Tracheophytes
- Clade: Angiosperms
- Clade: Eudicots
- Clade: Rosids
- Order: Sapindales
- Family: Simaroubaceae
- Genus: Quassia; L.

Species
- See text

Synonyms
- Biporeia Thouars; Hannoa Planch.; Hyptiandra Hook.f.; Locandi Adans.; Manduyta Comm. ex Steud.; Manungala Blanco; Mauduita Comm. ex DC.; Niota Lam.; Odyendea Engl.; Samadera Gaertn.; Samandura L.; Vitmannia Vahl

= Quassia =

Genus of flowering plants

Quassia (/ˈkwɒʃə/ or /ˈkwɒʃiə/) is a plant genus in the family Simaroubaceae. Its size is disputed; some botanists treat it as consisting of only one species, Quassia amara from tropical South America, while others treat it in a wide circumscription as a pantropical genus containing up to 40 species of trees and shrubs.

== Taxonomy ==
The genus was first published in Carl Linnaeus's book Species Plantarum ed. 2. on page 553 in 1762.

The genus was named after a former slave from Suriname, Graman Quassi in the eighteenth century. He discovered the medicinal properties of the bark of Quassia amara.

In 1962, Dutch botanist Hans Peter Nooteboom (1934–2022) had taken a very broad view of the genus Quassia L. and included therein various genera including, Hannoa Planch., Odyendyea (Pierre) Engl., Pierreodendron Engl., Samadera Gaertn., Simaba Aubl. and Simarouba Aubl. . Then in 2007, DNA sequencing, and phylogenetic analyses was carried out on members of the Simaroubaceae family. It found that genus Samadera was a sister to Clade V and that genus Quassia was also a sister to Clade V but they had separate lineages. This suggested the splitting up of genera Quassia again, with all Nooteboom's synonyms listed above being resurrected as independent genera. This includes Samadera indica Gaertn. as the accepted name for Quassia indica. The ornamental Quassia amara L., which is occasionally planted in Singapore, remains in genus Quassia.

== Distribution ==
Members of the genus are found in the tropics throughout the world.

== Species ==
The only accepted species of the genus, by Plants of the World Online as of November 2023 is: Quassia amara L.

Although World Flora Online accepts 16 species;

- Quassia africana (Baill.) Baill.
- Quassia amara L.
- Quassia arnhemensis Craven & Dunlop
- Quassia baileyana (Oliv.) Noot.
- Quassia bidwillii (Hook.f.) Noot.
- Quassia borneensis Noot.
- Quassia cedron (Planch.) D.Dietr.
- Quassia crustacea (Engl.) Noot.
- Quassia harmandiana (Pierre ex Laness.) Noot.
- Quassia indica (Gaertn.) Noot.
- Quassia maiana (Casar.) Noot.
- Quassia pohliana (F.Boas) Noot.
- Quassia sanguinea Cheek & Jongkind
- Quassia schweinfurthii (Oliv.) Noot.
- Quassia undulata (Guill. & Perr.) D.Dietr.
- Quassia versicolor Spreng.

There are also taxa that have not been assigned a formal status:

- Quassia sp. 'Moonee Creek', unplaced – Australia
- Quassia sp. 'Mount Nardi', unplaced – Australia

The genus has been verified by the United States Department of Agriculture and the Agricultural Research Service (Germplasm Resources Information Network) and they only list 6 species; Quassia amara, Quassia cedron (syn. Simaba cedron, Quassia excelsa (syn. Picrasma excelsa), Quassia indica (syn. Samadera indica Gaertn.), Quassia simarouba (syn. Simarouba amara Aubl.) and Quassia undulata.

== Uses ==
It is the source of the quassinoids such as quassin and neo-quassin. Simalikalactone D is a quassinoid that is extracted from Quassia africana for antiviral properties.
