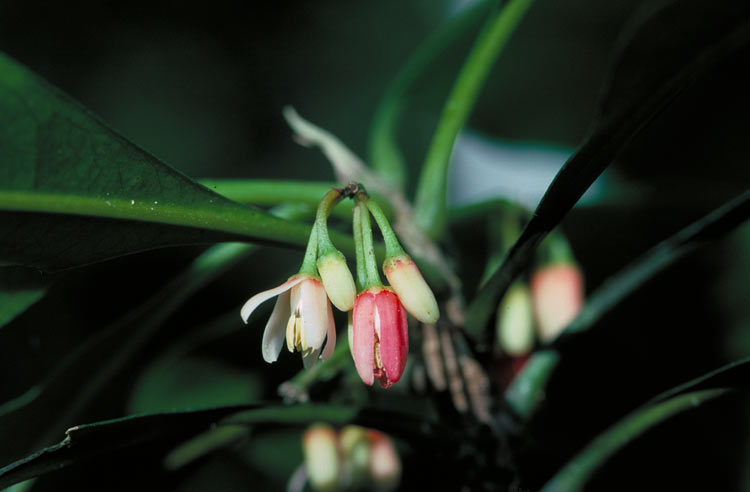
- Flowers

Scientific classification
- Kingdom: Plantae
- Clade: Embryophytes
- Clade: Tracheophytes
- Clade: Angiosperms
- Clade: Eudicots
- Clade: Rosids
- Order: Sapindales
- Family: Simaroubaceae
- Genus: Samadera
- Species: S. baileyana

Binomial name
- Samadera baileyana Oliv.

Synonyms
- Quassia baileyana (Oliv.) Noot.; Simaba baileyana (Oliv.) Feuillet; Hyptiandra bidwillii var. grandiuscula F.M.Bailey

= Samadera baileyana =

Species of flowering plant

Samadera baileyana is a species of plant in the family Simaroubaceae. It is native to the Wet Tropics bioregion of Queensland, Australia.

== Description ==
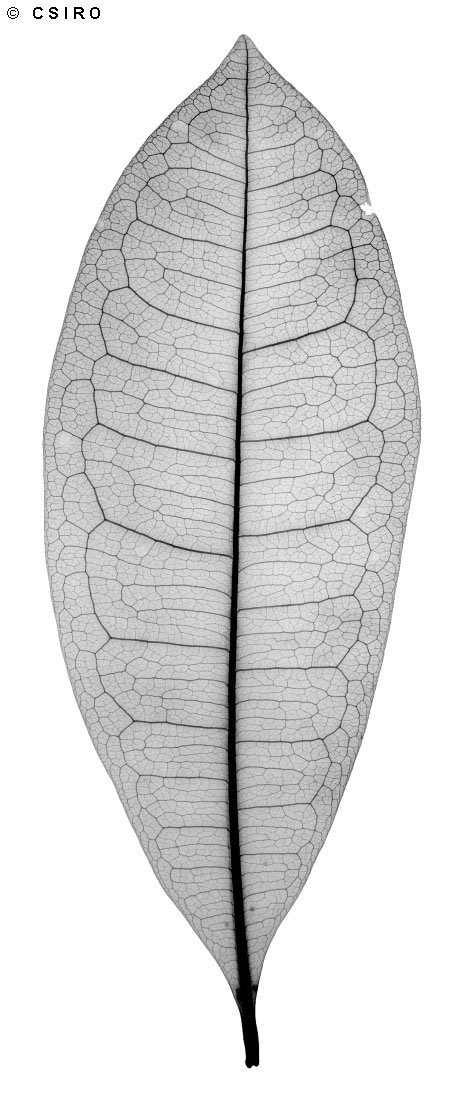
Leaf venation

Samadera baileyana is a small tree growing to about 10 m (33 ft) tall. The leaves are generally obovate to oblanceolate and can be as long as 29 cm (11 in). The petiole, or leaf stalk, is about 15 mm (0.6 in) long. Lateral veins are prominent and are almost perpendicular to the midrib; they form well-defined loops inside the leaf margin. Flat glands are present on the underside, near the petiole.

Flowers are borne in clusters described as "pseudo-umbels". They have a five-lobed calyx about 1 mm (0.04 in) long, and five petals about 10 mm (0.39 in) long. The petals are pink to red in colour and are glabrous (hairless). There are ten stamens and the ovary has five carpels, or chambers.

The fruit is a drupe up to 4 cm (1.6 in) long, ovoid or ellipsoid, and orange in colour.

== Distribution ==
This species is endemic to northeast Queensland, Australia, and grows in mature rainforest from Cape Tribulation to Innisfail. It may be found in the lowlands up to about 750 m (2,460 ft) above sea level.

== Conservation ==
This species is listed as least concern in the Queensland Government's WildNet database. No explanation is provided for the assessment. As of August 2026, it has not been assessed by the International Union for Conservation of Nature.

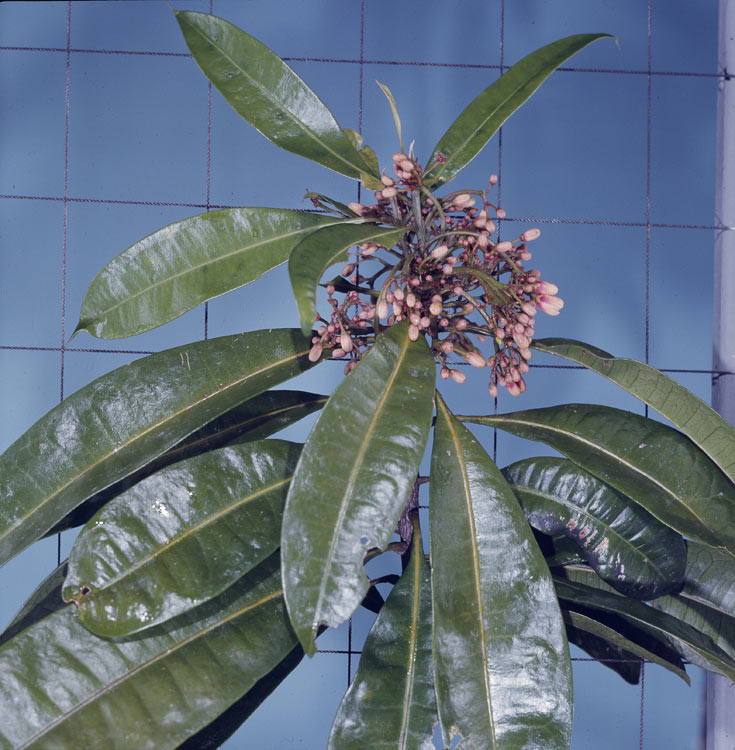
Foliage and flower buds
