= Pierreodendron kerstingii =

Conservation status
- Vulnerable (IUCN 2.3)

Scientific classification
- Kingdom: Plantae
- Clade: Tracheophytes
- Clade: Angiosperms
- Clade: Eudicots
- Clade: Rosids
- Order: Sapindales
- Family: Simaroubaceae
- Genus: Pierreodendron
- Species: P. kerstingii

Binomial name
- Pierreodendron kerstingii (Engl.) Little

Synonyms
- Simarubopisis kerstingii Engl.; Mannia kerstingii (Engl.) Harms; Mannia simarubopsis Pellegr.

Species of tree

Pierreodendron kerstingii is a species of tree in the family Simaroubaceae. It is endemic to West Africa and found in Ivory Coast, Ghana, Togo, and Benin. It is sometimes considered synonym of Pierreodendron africanum, which would then be a widespread species distributed south to Angola and east to the Democratic Republic of the Congo.

== Description and uses ==
It is a large forest tree growing to 24 m (80 ft) tall. The flowers are red and ripe fruits are yellow. The bark is used as insecticide and rat poison, and the extract has anti-tumor properties.

== Habitat and conservation ==
Pierreodendron kerstingii occurs in heavily exploited, semi-deciduous forests. It is an uncommon species threatened by habitat loss.
