= Quassin =

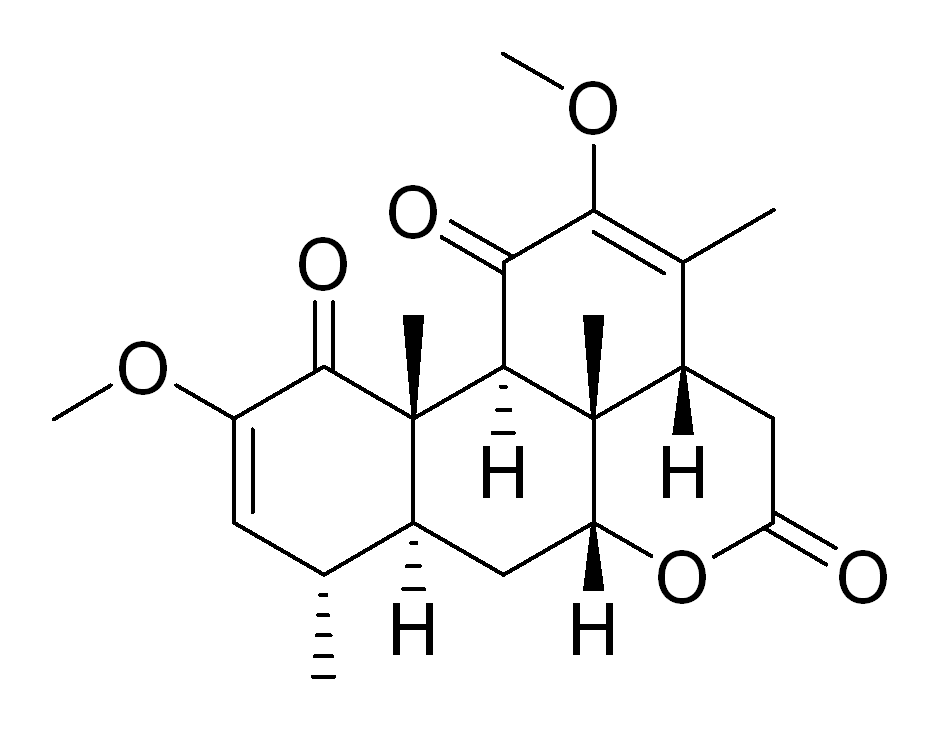
- (+)-Quassin

Names
- IUPAC name 2,12-Dimethoxypicrasa-2,12-diene-1,11,16-trione
- Systematic IUPAC name (3aR,3a^{1}S,6aR,7aS,8S,11aS,11bS)-2,10-Dimethoxy-3,3a^{1},8,11a-tetramethyl-3a,3a^{1},6a,7,7a,8,11a,11b-octahydrophenanthro[10,1-bc]pyran-1,5,11(4H)-trione

Identifiers
CAS Number	76-78-8
3D model (JSmol)	Interactive image
ChEMBL	ChEMBL517016
ChemSpider	59014
ECHA InfoCard	100.000.897
EC Number	200-985-9
PubChem CID	65571
UNII	QP1YAK6QGK
CompTox Dashboard (EPA)	DTXSID30878613
- InChI: InChI=1S/C22H28O6/c1-10-7-14(26-5)20(25)22(4)12(10)8-15-21(3)13(9-16(23)28-15)11(2)18(27-6)17(24)19(21)22/h7,10,12-13,15,19H,8-9H2,1-6H3/t10-,12+,13+,15-,19+,21-,22+/m1/s1 = Key: IOSXSVZRTUWBHC-LBTVDEKVSA-N =; Key: IOSXSVZRTUWBHC-LBTVDEKVBB; InChI=1/C22H28O6/c1-10-7-14(26-5)20(25)22(4)12(10)8-15-21(3)13(9-16(23)28-15)11(2)18(27-6)17(24)19(21)22/h7,10,12-13,15,19H,8-9H2,1-6H3/t10-,12+,13+,15-,19+,21-,22+/m1/s1 Key: IOSXSVZRTUWBHC-LBTVDEKVBB
- SMILES: O=C1C(\OC)=C/[C@@H](C)[C@H]4[C@]1([C@H]3C(=O)C(\OC)=C(/[C@@H]2CC(=O)O[C@@H]([C@@]23C)C4)C)C

Properties
Chemical formula	C_{22}H_{28}O_{6}
Molar mass	388.460 g·mol^{−1}
Appearance	White crystalline substance
Melting point	200 to 222 °C (392 to 432 °F; 473 to 495 K)
Boiling point	586 °C (1,087 °F; 859 K)
Solubility in water	Insoluble
Vapor pressure	13 mmHg (@25 °C)
- Except where otherwise noted, data are given for materials in their standard state (at 25 °C [77 °F], 100 kPa). verify (what is ?) Infobox references

Quassin is a white, bitter, crystalline substance that is the prototypical example of the family of quassinoids. It can be extracted from the quassia tree, from which it gets its name. It was first isolated in 1937, and its chemical structure was elucidated in 1961.

It is one of the most bitter substances found in nature, with a bitter threshold of 0.08 ppm and it is 50 times more bitter than quinine.

Extracts of the bitterwood tree (Quassia amara) containing quassin are used as additives in soft drinks.

Although its skeleton possesses 20 carbon atoms, quassin is not a diterpene but rather a triterpene lactone, which derives from euphol by loss of 10 carbon atoms including C4.
