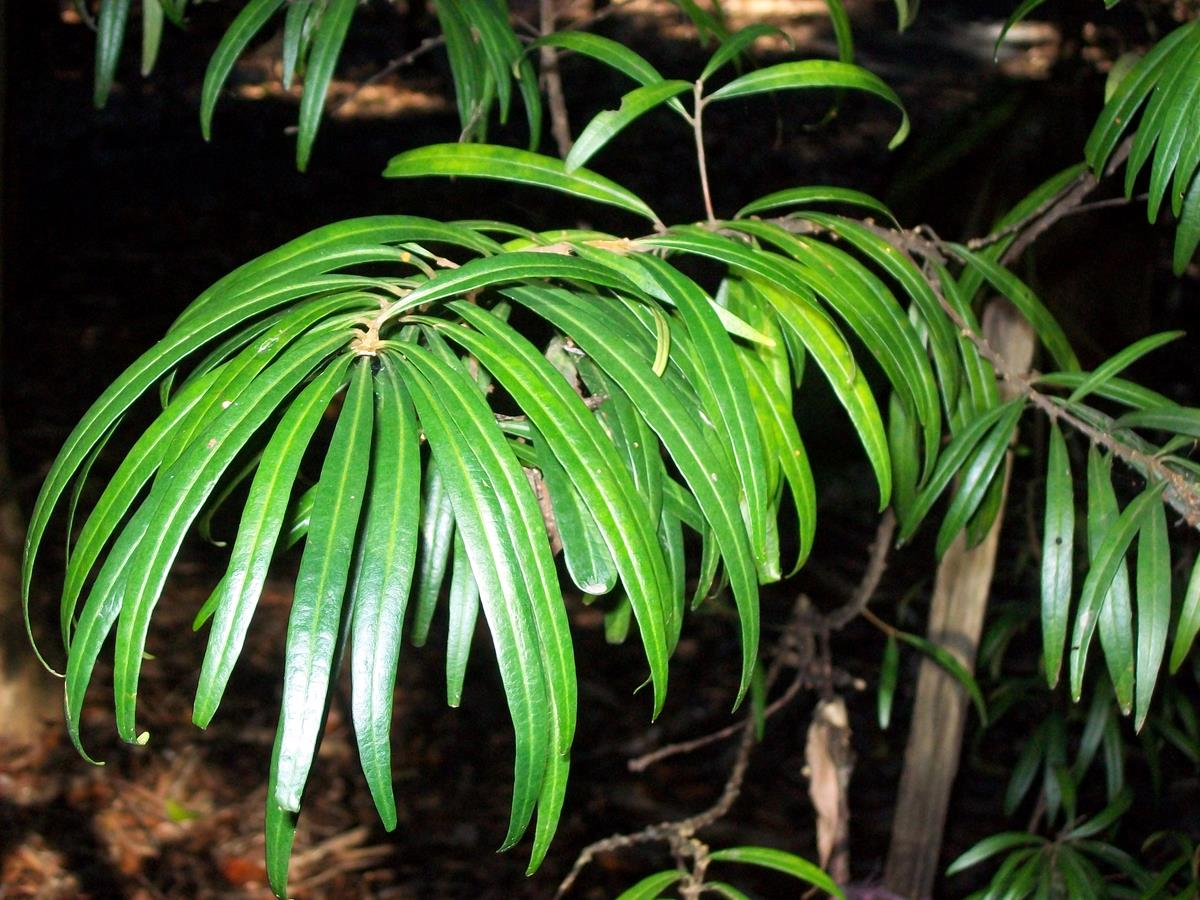

Scientific classification
- Kingdom: Plantae
- Clade: Tracheophytes
- Clade: Angiosperms
- Clade: Eudicots
- Clade: Rosids
- Order: Sapindales
- Family: Simaroubaceae
- Genus: Quassia
- Species: Q. sp. 'Moonee Creek'

Binomial name
- Quassia sp. 'Moonee Creek'

Synonyms
- Samadera sp. Moonee Creek (J.King s.n. Nov. 1949); Quassia sp. B.; Quassia bidwilli sensu Harden (1991); Quassia sp. B sensu Harden (1993); Quassia bidwillii sensu Harden (1991); Quassia sp.1 (Mooney Creek) [24573]; Quassia sp. (J. King s.n., 1949; Mooney Creek) [67250]; Quassia sp. Mooney Creek (J.King s.n. 1949) [56783]; Quassia sp. Moonee Creek [78975]; Quassia sp. Moonee Creek (King s.n. 1949) [78991]

= Quassia sp. 'Moonee Creek' =

Moonee quassia

Species of shrub

Quassia sp. 'Moonee Creek', the Moonee quassia, is a shrub found in north eastern New South Wales, Australia. A rare plant, listed as endangered by extinction. However, it has yet to be formally named.

It grows below eucalyptus forest, often in high rainfall areas. From the Coffs Harbour, Dorrigo and Grafton regions, mostly at lower altitudes. Known from 18 locations between Moonee Beach in the south, to McCraes Knob which is some 12 km east of the Clarence River in the north. It was originally known from an ash heap at Glenreagh, next to the Dorrigo railway line.

A bush to 2 metres tall, with narrow leaves, 10 cm long, alternate on the stem. Stems are usually not straight, (which indicates spasmodic growth patterns). Leaves are dark glossy green above, and paler below. The leaf veins are at a wide angle in relation to the mid-rib. Small green/red flowers form in clusters of one to four flowers. The fruit is a hairy red drupe, 5 to 10 mm long.
