= Graman Quassi =

Surinamese botanist (1692–1787)

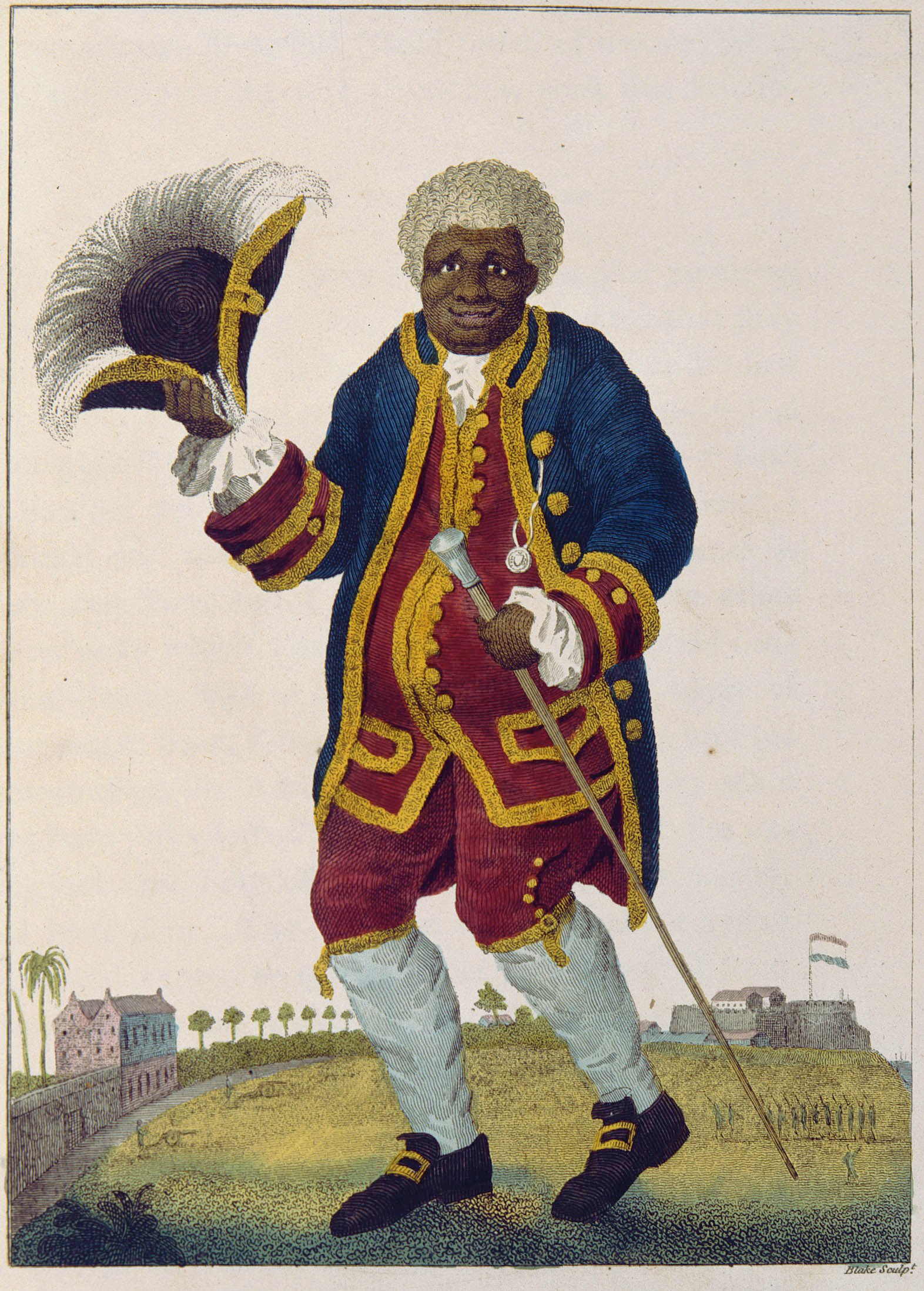
- Born: c. 1692; Gold Coast (region)
- Died: March 12, 1787 (aged 94–95); Paramaribo, Surinam
- Occupations: Physician, botanist, planter

Graman Quassi (c. 1692 – 12 March 1787) was a Surinamese physician, botanist and planter. Born in present-day Ghana, Quassi was taken to the Dutch colony of Surinam via the Atlantic slave trade, where he was initially enslaved on a sugar plantation before managing to emancipate himself. Assisting the Dutch colonial authorities in suppressing the activities of local maroons, he managed to rise to the top of the colony's small community of free people of color and eventually became a plantation owner himself. He gave his name to the plant genus Quassia.

== Biography ==
Quassi's roots were among the Kwa speaking Akan people of present-day Ghana, but as a child he was enslaved and brought to the New World. In Suriname, a Dutch colony in South America, he was first put to work in the sugar plantation of New Timotebo. Quassi had great linguistic and botanical knowledge. He was famed as a healer. He obtained his freedom in 1755.

Quassi participated in the colonial wars against the Saramaka maroons as a scout and negotiator for the Dutch. He lost his right ear during the fighting. For this reason the Surinamese Maroons remember him as a traitor. In the late 1760s, he was owner of a slave plantation.

In February 1772, he visited the Netherlands, and was given an audience by William V, Prince of Orange. He returned to Suriname in September 1772.

On 12 March 1787, Governor Wichers announced that Quassi had died in Paramaribo at the age of at least 95. He was buried by the Free Negro Corps.

== Legacy ==
One of his remedies was a bitter tea that he used to treat infections by intestinal parasites, this concoction was based on the plant Quassia amara which Carl Linnaeus named after him, as the discoverer of its medicinal properties. Quassia continues to be used in industrially produced medicines against intestinal parasites today. In contemporary accounts he was described as "one of the most extraordinary black men in Suriname, and perhaps the world"

== See also ==
- List of kidnappings
