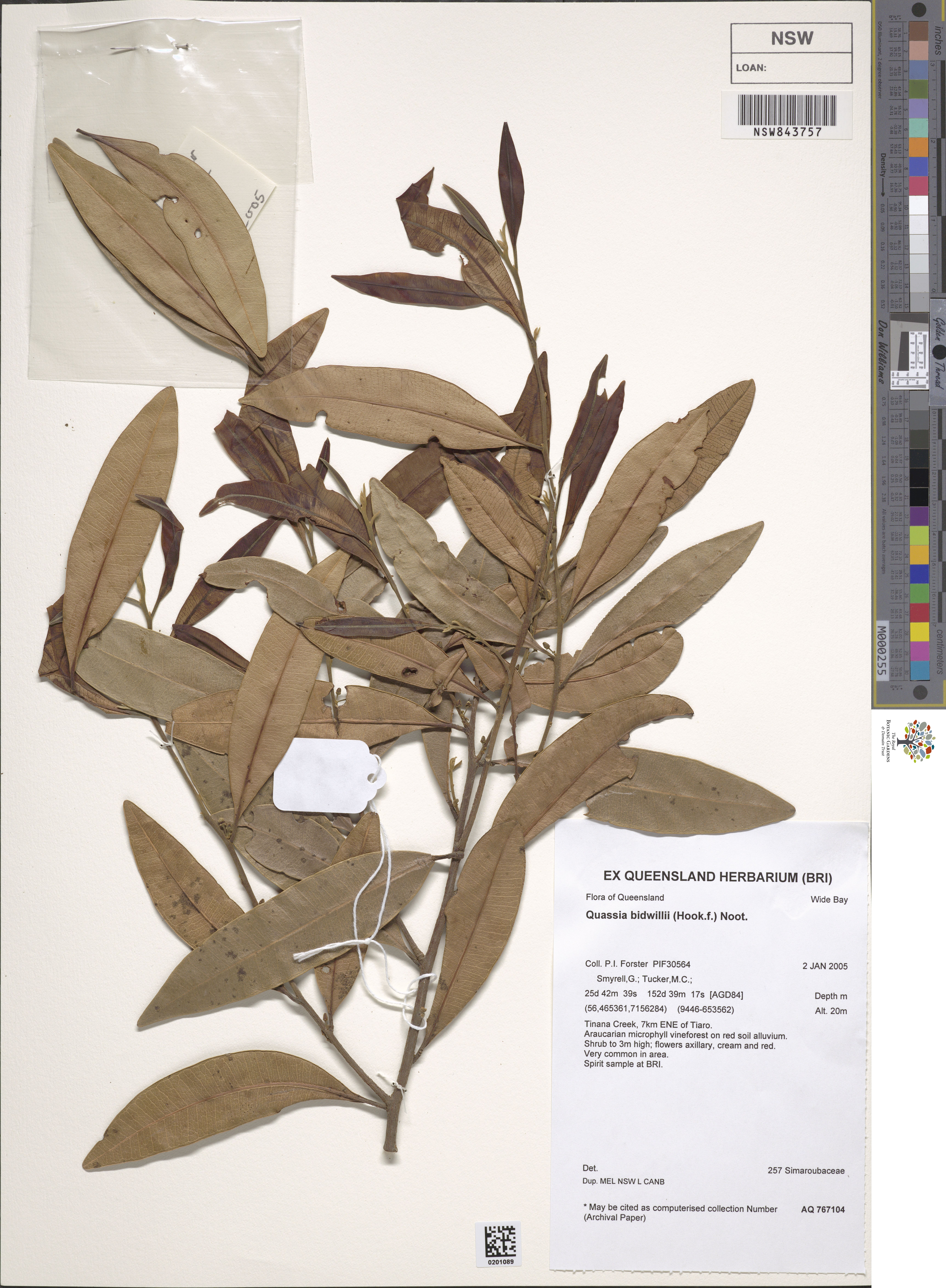
- Herbarium specimen

Conservation status
- Vulnerable (NCA)

Scientific classification
- Kingdom: Plantae
- Clade: Tracheophytes
- Clade: Angiosperms
- Clade: Eudicots
- Clade: Rosids
- Order: Sapindales
- Family: Simaroubaceae
- Genus: Samadera
- Species: S. bidwillii

Binomial name
- Samadera bidwillii Oliv.

Synonyms
- Hyptiandra bidwillii Benth. & Hook.f.; Quassia bidwillii (Benth. & Hook.f.) Noot.; Simaba bidwillii (Benth. & Hook.f.) Feuillet

= Samadera bidwillii =

Species of flowering plant

Samadera bidwillii is a species of plant in the family Simaroubaceae. It is native to Queensland, Australia, and ranges from the top of Cape York Peninsula to Gympie, where it grows in rainforest and vine thickets. It has a conservation status of vulnerable. The species as currently described may consist of more than one taxa.

== Description ==
Samadera bidwillii is a shrub or small tree growing up to 6 m (20 ft) tall. The leaves are long and narrow, measuring up to 15 cm (5.9 in) long by 1.2 cm (0.47 in) wide, with numerous lateral veins on either side of the midvein. They are glossy dark green above, yellowish green and finely hairy below. Flowers occur in axillary clusters, on short pedicels (stalks) about 4 mm (0.16 in) long. They have four or five petals about 2.5 mm (0.10 in) long. The fruit is a cluster of up to four single-seeded mericarps measuring about 10 mm (0.4 in) long.

== Distribution and habitat ==
It grows in drier rainforests and vine thickets, and occurs along much of the east coast of Queensland, from the top of Cape York Peninsula to Gympie in the southeast. There are a number of disjunct populations, with the main groups being near Cape York, Rockhampton and Maryborough, and with other more isolated occurrences in between these groups.

== Taxonomy ==
This species was first described as Hyptiandra bidwillii in 1862, and transferred to Samadera bidwillii in 1896. Specimens collected in New South Wales were previously included under this name but are now treated as "Quassia sp. Moonee Creek (J.King s.n. Nov. 1949)". It is thought that the species as currently recognised needs review and possibly splitting into additional taxa.

== Conservation status ==
It has been given a conservation status of vulnerable in the Queensland government's WildNet database. An explanation of the assessment is not provided in the public database.

== Gallery ==
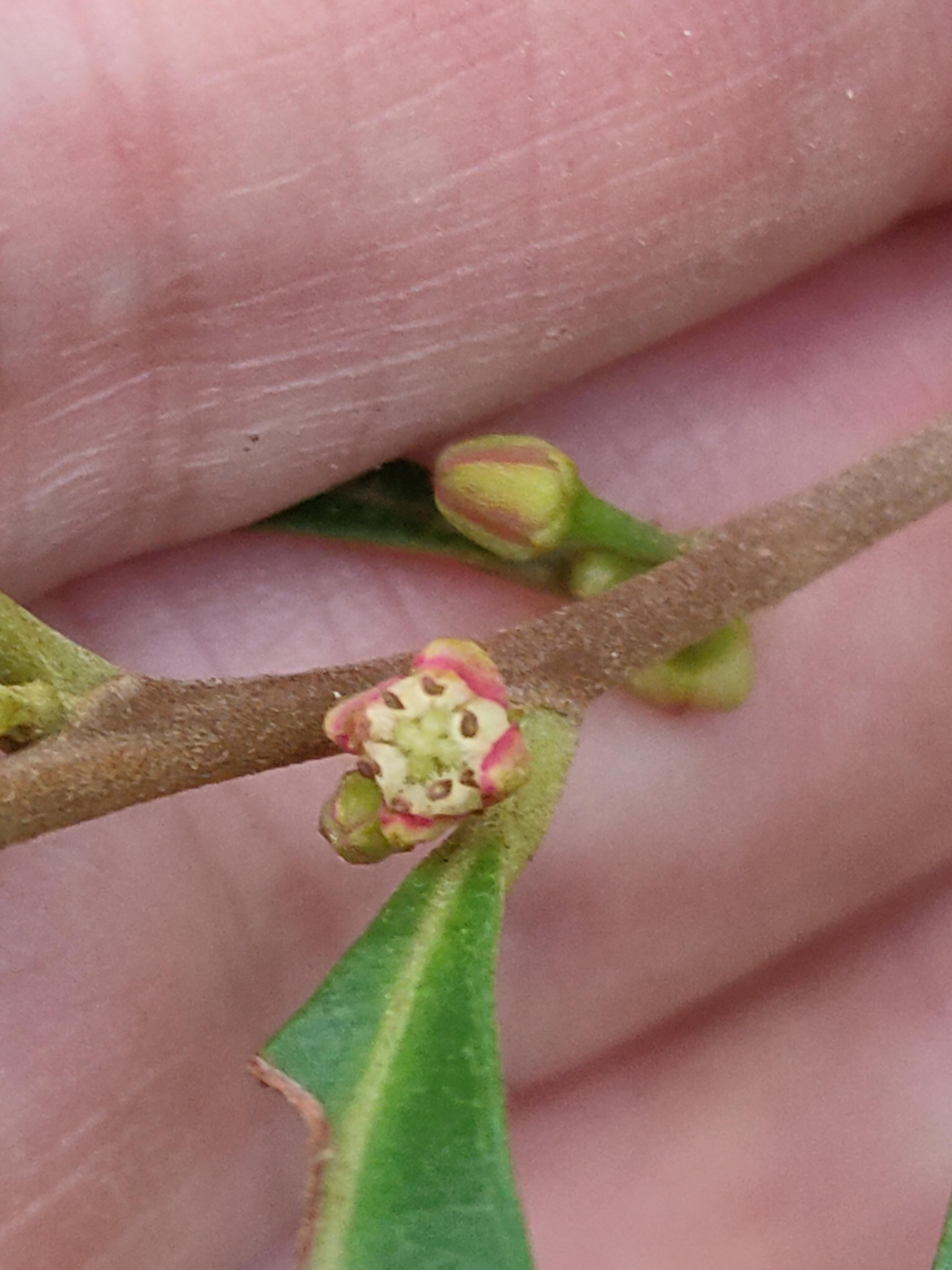
Flower and flower buds

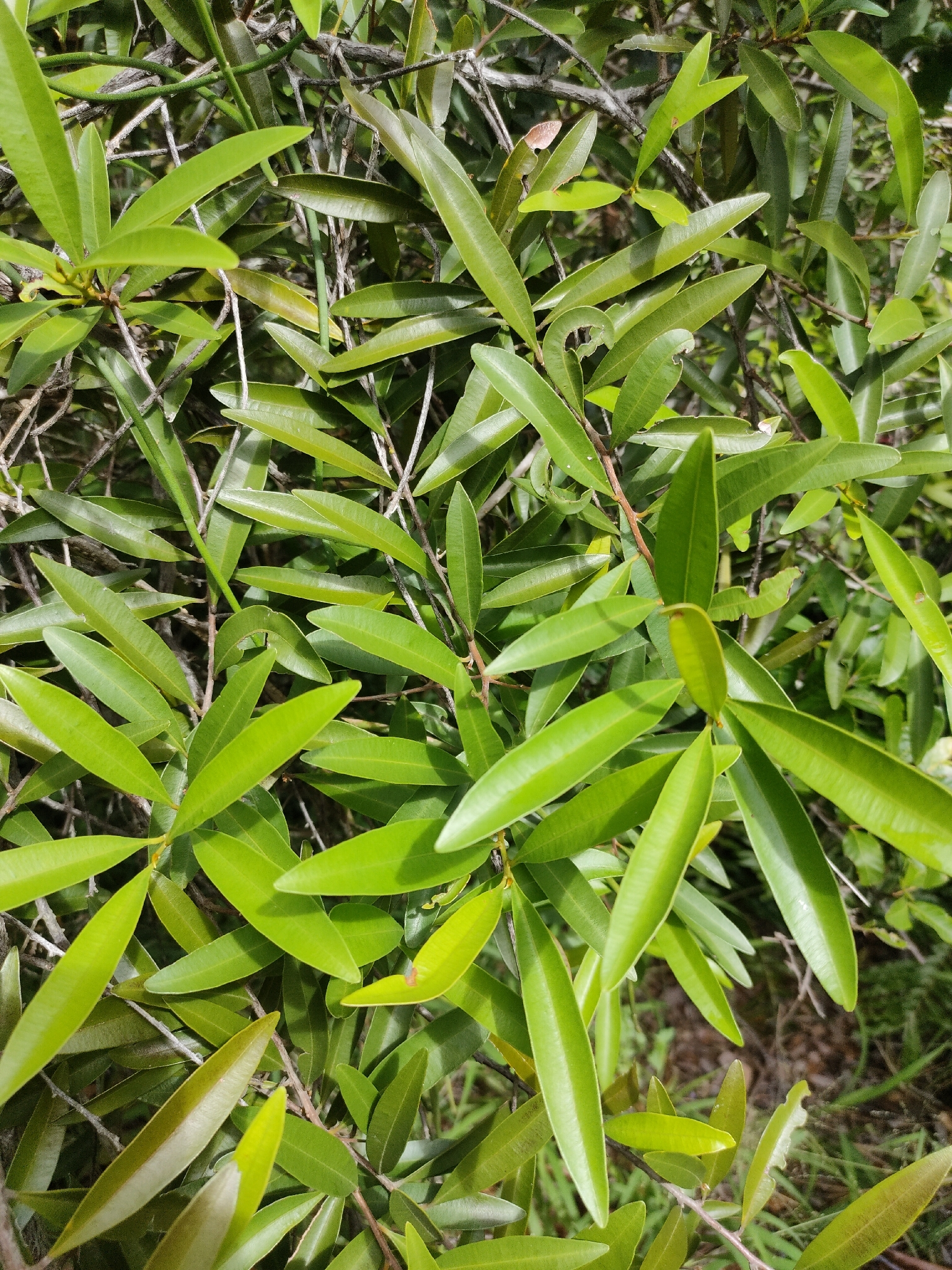
Foliage

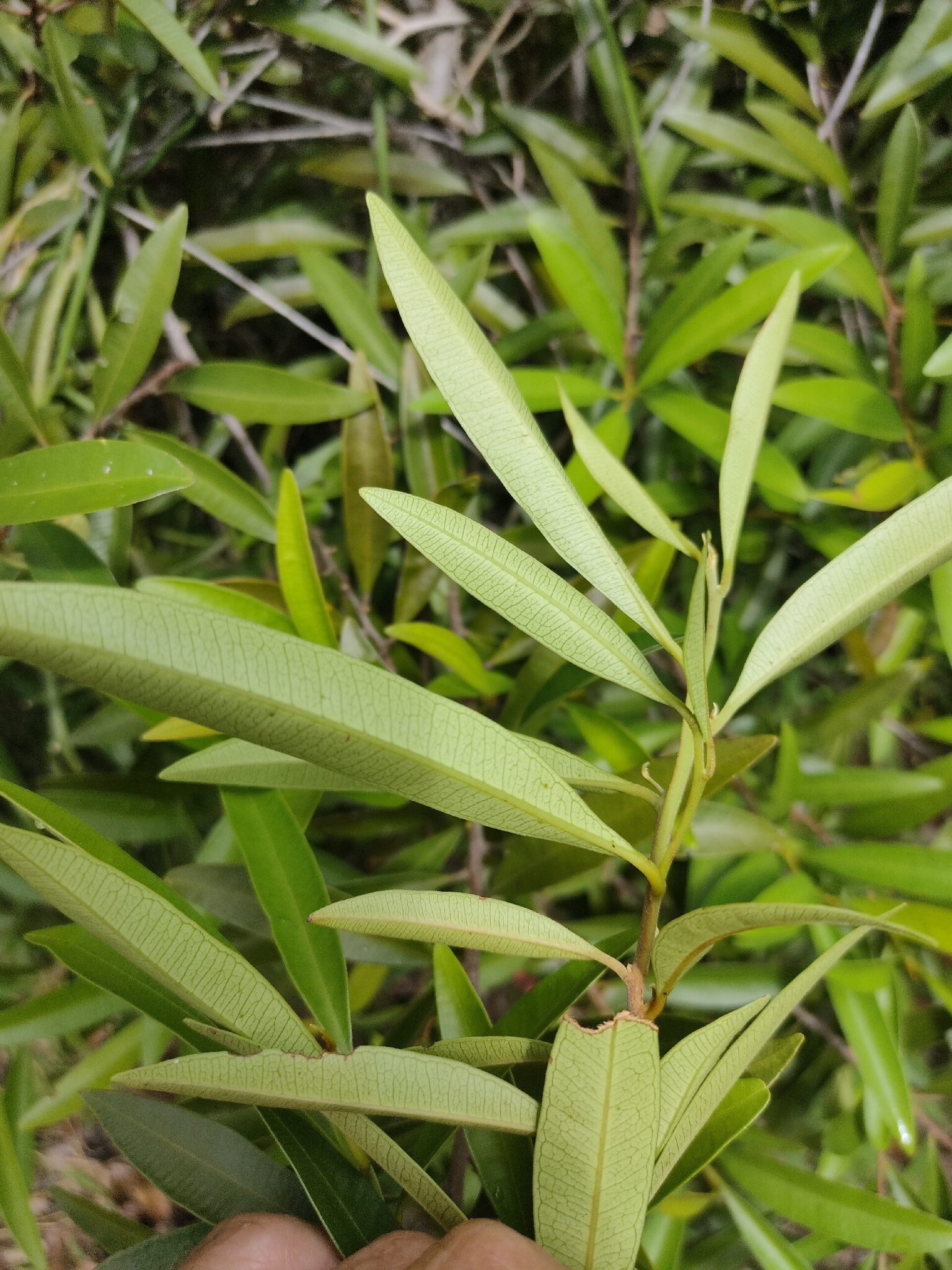
Underside of leaves
