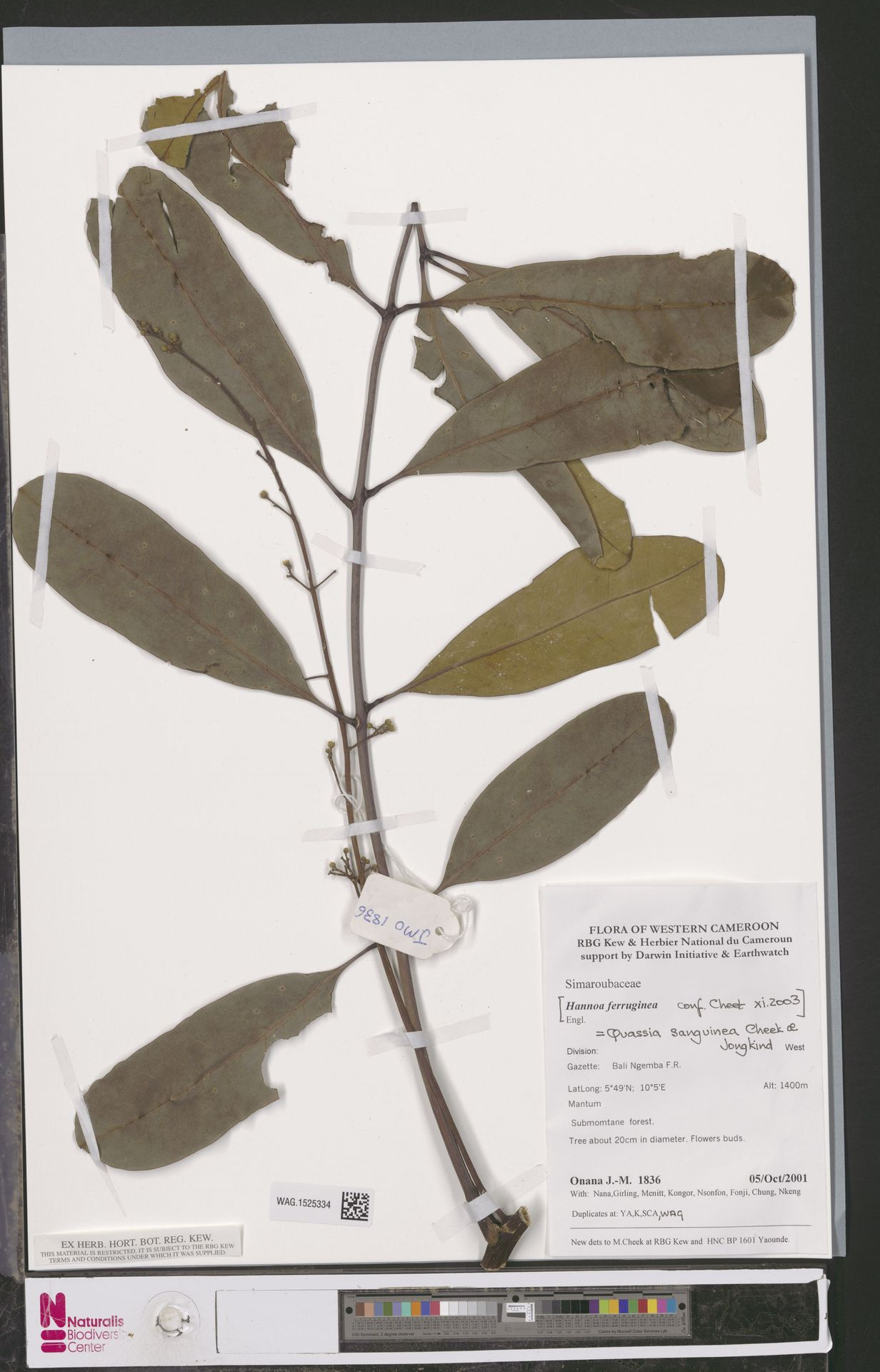

Conservation status
- Vulnerable (IUCN 3.1)

Scientific classification
- Kingdom: Plantae
- Clade: Tracheophytes
- Clade: Angiosperms
- Clade: Eudicots
- Clade: Rosids
- Order: Sapindales
- Family: Simaroubaceae
- Genus: Quassia
- Species: Q. sanguinea

Binomial name
- Quassia sanguinea Cheek & Jongkind ined.

Synonyms
- Hannoa ferruginea Engl.

= Quassia sanguinea =

Species of flowering plant

Quassia sanguinea is a species of plant in the Simaroubaceae family. It is found in Cameroon and Nigeria. Its natural habitats are subtropical or tropical moist lowland forests and subtropical or tropical moist montane forests. It is threatened by habitat loss.
