= Pierreodendron =

Scientific classification
- Kingdom: Plantae
- Clade: Tracheophytes
- Clade: Angiosperms
- Clade: Eudicots
- Clade: Rosids
- Order: Sapindales
- Family: Simaroubaceae
- Genus: Pierreodendron; Engl.

Synonyms
- Mannia Hook.f.; Simarubopsis Engl.

Genus of flowering plants

Pierreodendron is a genus of plants in the family Simaroubaceae.

Its native range is western tropical Africa and is found in Angola, Benin, Cameroon, Congo, Gabon, Ghana, Ivory Coast, Liberia, Nigeria, Togo and Zaïre.

It was first published by German botanist Adolf Engler in Bot. Jahrb. Syst. vol.39 on page 575 in 1907.

The genus name of Pierreodendron is in honour of Jean Baptiste Louis Pierre (1833–1905), a French botanist known for his Asian studies, as well as dendron the Greek word for tree.

Hans Peter Nooteboom (1934–2022) in 1962 (published in 1963), took a very broad view of the genus Quassia L. and included therein various genera including, Hannoa Planch., Odyendyea (Pierre) Engl., Pierreodendron Engl., Samadera Gaertn., Simaba Aubl. and also Simarouba Aubl. In 2007, molecular analyses of the Simaroubaceae family (Clayton et al., 2007), suggested the splitting up of genera Quassia again, with all Nooteboom's synonyms listed above being resurrected as independent genera.

== Known species ==
According to Plants of the World Online;

- Pierreodendron africanum (Hook.f.) Little
- Pierreodendron kerstingii (Engl.) Little
