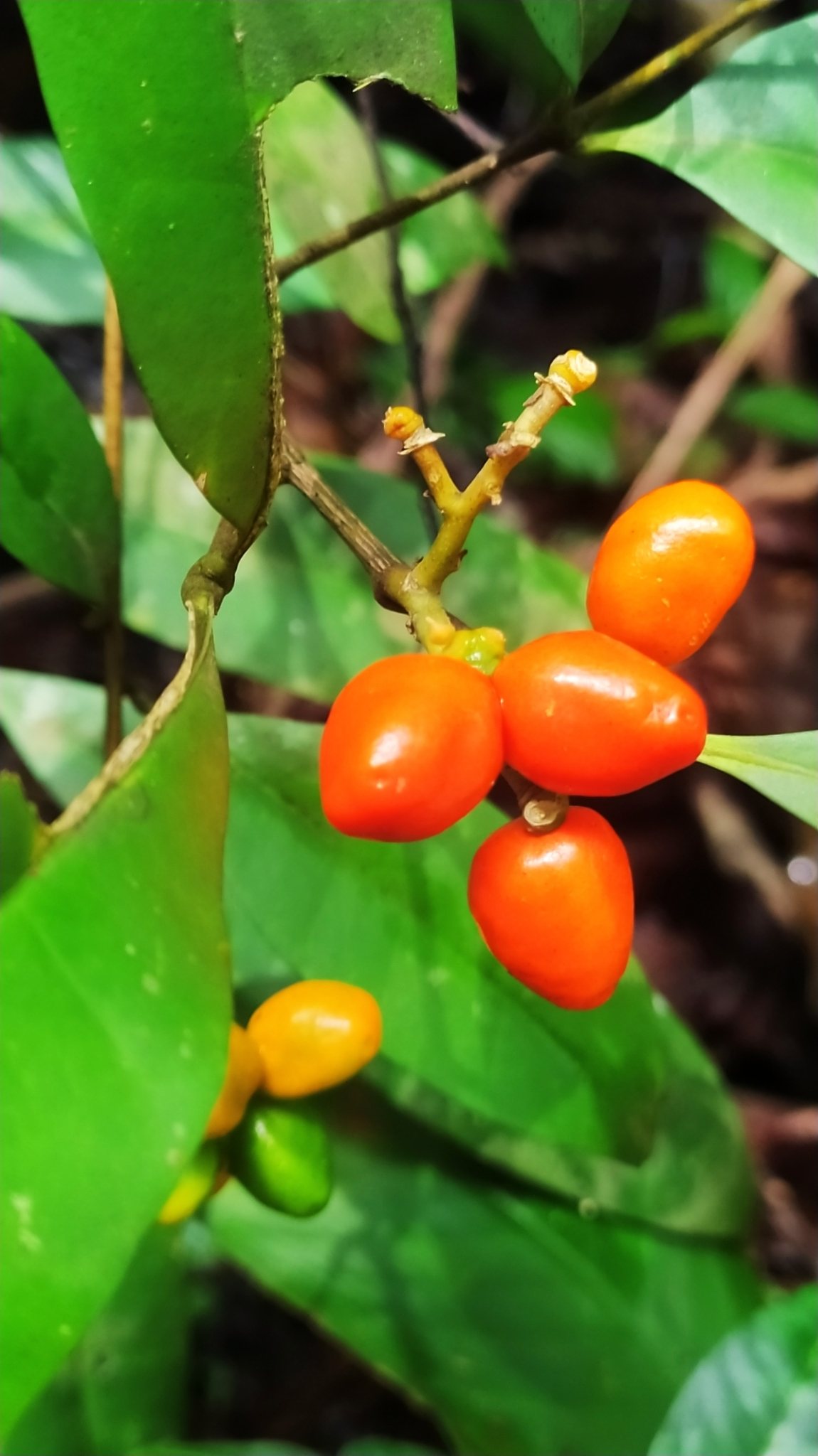
- Simaba guianensis

Scientific classification
- Kingdom: Plantae
- Clade: Tracheophytes
- Clade: Angiosperms
- Clade: Eudicots
- Clade: Rosids
- Order: Sapindales
- Family: Simaroubaceae
- Genus: Simaba; Aubl.

Synonyms
- Aruba Aubl. in Hist. Pl. Guiane 1: 293 (1775); Phyllostema Neck. in Elem. Bot. 2: 301 (1790), opus utique oppr.; Zwingera Schreb. in Gen. Pl., ed. 8[a].: 802 (1791), nom. illeg.

= Simaba =

Genus of flowering plants

Simaba is a genus of flowering plants belonging to the family Simaroubaceae.

Its native range stretches from southern tropical America and Trinidad, across to western tropical Africa to Angola then across to western Malesia.

It was first published by French botanist Jean Baptiste Christophore Fusée Aublet (1720–1778), in Hist. Pl. Guiane on page 409 in 1775.

Hans Peter Nooteboom (1934–2022) in 1962 (published in 1963), took a very broad view of the genus Quassia L. and included therein various genera including, Hannoa Planch., Odyendyea (Pierre) Engl., Pierreodendron Engl., Samadera Gaertn., Simaba Aubl. and Simarouba Aubl. In 2007, molecular analyses of the Simaroubaceae family (Clayton et al., 2007), suggested the splitting up of genera Quassia again, with all Nooteboom's synonyms listed above being resurrected as independent genera.

== Species ==
As accepted by Plants of the World Online;

- Simaba africana Baill.
- Simaba borneensis (Noot.) Feuillet
- Simaba guianensis Aubl.
- Simaba monophylla (Oliv.) Cronquist
- Simaba obovata Spruce ex Engl.
- Simaba orinocensis Kunth
- Simaba polyphylla (Cavalcante) W.W.Thomas
- Simaba pubicarpa Devecchi, W.W.Thomas & Francesch.

== Distribution ==
The genus is native to the countries (and regions) of; southern America (within Bolivia, Brazil, Costa Rica, Colombia, Ecuador, French Guiana, Guyana, Panamá, Peru, Suriname and Venezuela), the Caribbean, (within Trinidad and Tobago), tropical Africa (within Angola, Cabinda (in Angola), Cameroon, Congo, Equatorial Guinea, Gabon, and Zaïre (now Democratic Republic of the Congo) and western Malesia (within Borneo and Sumatra).
