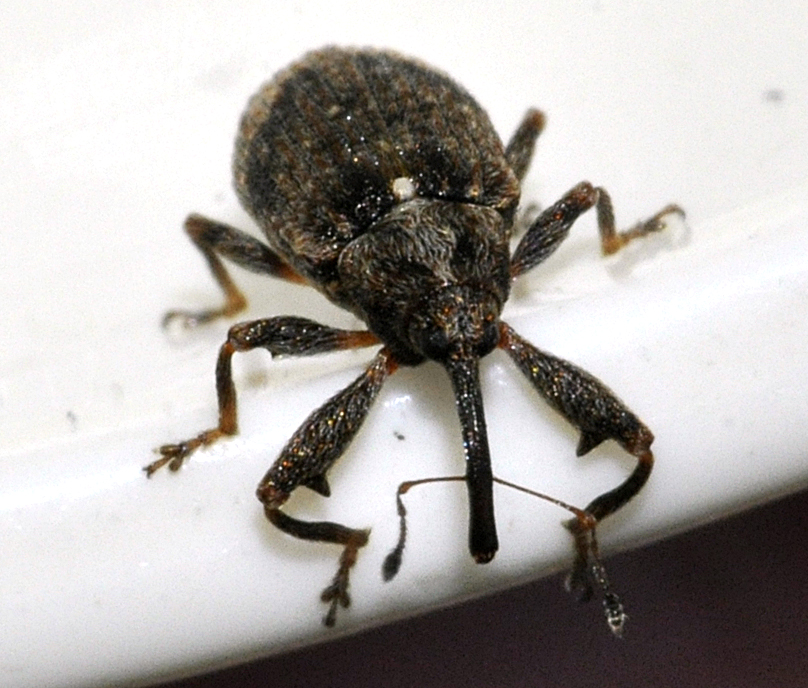

Scientific classification
- Kingdom: Animalia
- Phylum: Arthropoda
- Clade: Pancrustacea
- Class: Insecta
- Order: Coleoptera
- Suborder: Polyphaga
- Infraorder: Cucujiformia
- Superfamily: Curculionoidea
- Family: Curculionidae
- Genus: Anthonomus
- Species: A. pomorum

Binomial name
- Anthonomus pomorum (Linnaeus, 1758)

= Anthonomus pomorum =

Apple Blossom Weevil

Species of beetle

Anthonomus pomorum or the apple blossom weevil is a univoltine herbivore of apple trees, Malus domestica.

== Life history ==
Adults generally overwinter in leaf litter of forests or hedgerows. In the spring, they emigrate to orchards and colonize apple trees. They may find their host trees using pheromones or plant-derived chemical cues.

Spiders can be effective predators of A. pomorum.
