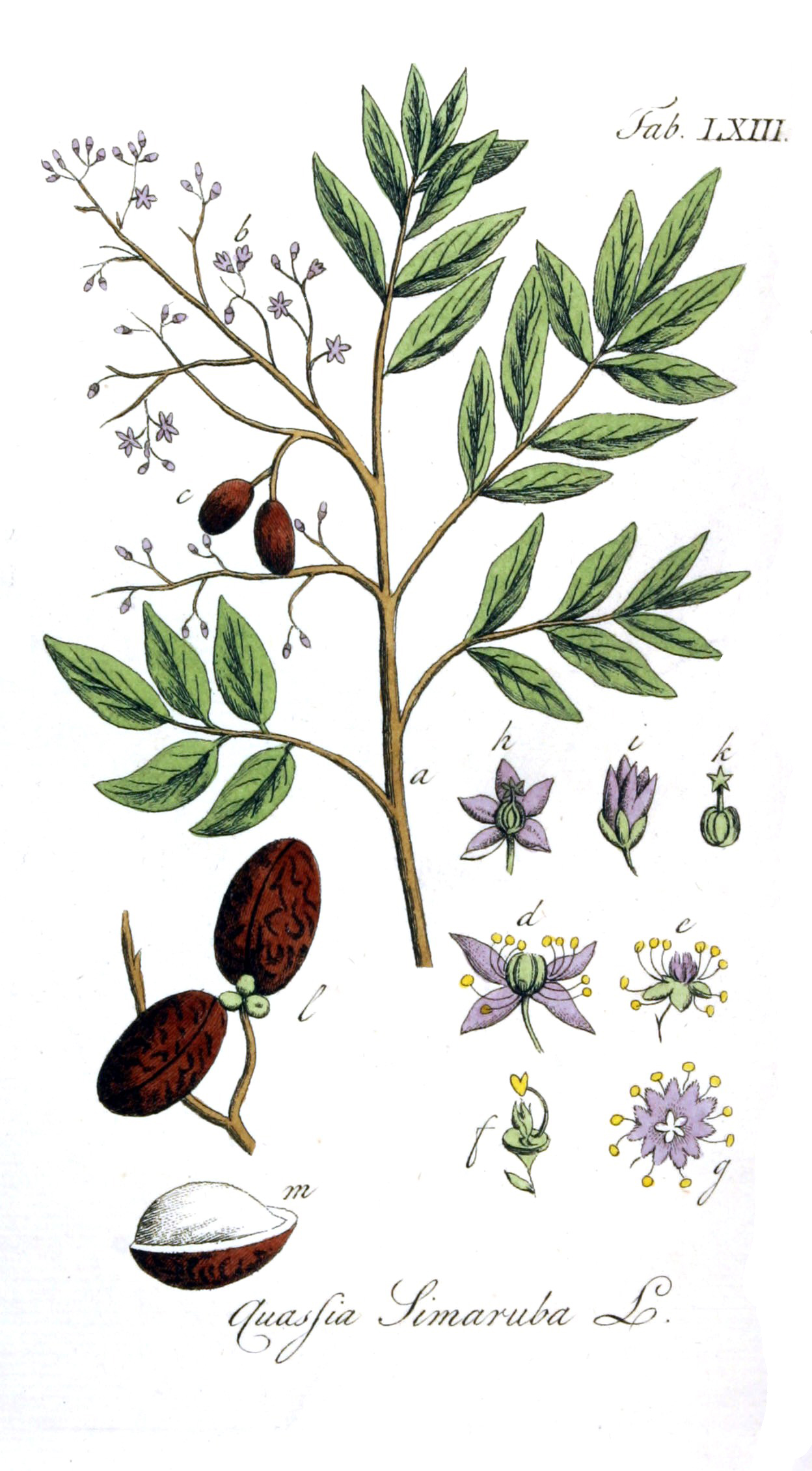
- Simarouba amara

Scientific classification
- Kingdom: Plantae
- Clade: Tracheophytes
- Clade: Angiosperms
- Clade: Eudicots
- Clade: Rosids
- Order: Sapindales
- Family: Simaroubaceae
- Genus: Simarouba; Aubl. 1775

Type species
- Simarouba amara Aubl.

Species
- Simarouba amara Simarouba berteroana Simarouba glauca Simarouba laevis Simarouba tulae Simarouba versicolor

= Simarouba =

Family of shrubs and trees

Simarouba is a genus of trees and shrubs in the family Simaroubaceae, native to the neotropics. It has been grouped in the subtribe Simaroubina along with the Simaba and Quassia genera. They have compound leaves, with between 1 and 12 pairs of alternate pinnate leaflets. Their flowers are unisexual, relatively small (around 1 cm long) and arranged in large panicles. Plants are dioecious, bearing only male or female flowers. The individual flowers have between 4 and 6 sepals and petals and between 8 and 12 stamens. The fruit is a carpophore and has up to 5 drupaceous mericarps.

In 1944, Adolf Engler and Arthur Cronquist separated the species in the genus, based mainly on the morphology of their flowers, but also using differences in their leaf structure. S. amara, S. glauca and S. versicolor are continental tree species and are often confused with each other, particularly in areas where more than one species is present in the flora. S. amara can be distinguished by having smaller flowers and anthers than S. glauca and S. versicolor and by it having straight, rather than curved petals; its fruit are also smaller. S. glauca can be distinguished by the lack of trichomes on its leaves compared with those of S. versicolor, which has dense tomentose leaves. S. versicolor has a greater variation in flower size than S. glauca and the leaf veins of S. glauca are generally more evident than those of S. versicolor. Geographically, S. glauca and S. versicolor are easy to distinguish since the southerly range of S. glauca is limited to Panama, whereas S. versicolor is only found in South America. A phylogenetic analysis in 1995 based on the large sub-unit of rubisco suggested that Simarouba was most closely related to the Leitneria and Ailanthus genera, but a later study in 2007, based on three chloroplastic genes and one nuclear gene, found it was most closely related to Pierreodendron and Simaba.

Structure	S. amara	S. glauca	S. versicolor
Flower	3–5 mm long	4–7.5 mm long	4–7.5 mm long
Anthers	0.4–1.2 mm long	1.3–2.0 mm long	1.0–1.5 mm long
Petals	Straight, dull yellow-green to white	Curved, brighter yellow with a touch of orange or red	Curved
Fruits	1.0–1.5 x 0.6–1.0 cm	2.0–2.5 x 1.2–1.5 cm	2.0–2.5 x 1.5–2.0 cm

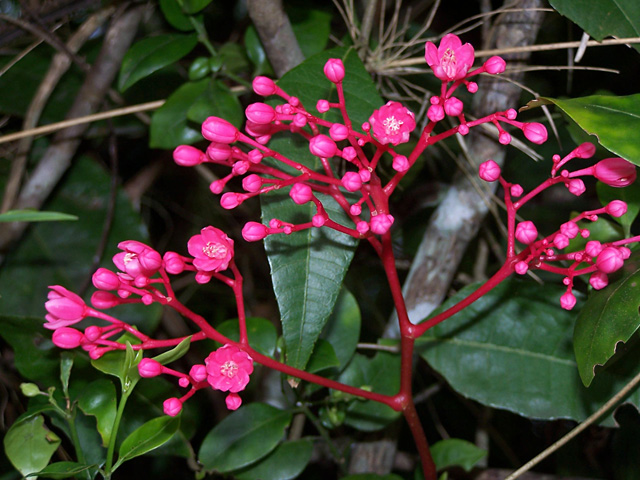
Inflorescence of Simarouba tulae

S. berteroana, S. laevis and S. tulae are endemic to the Caribbean islands.

== Discovery and uses ==
In 1713, the genus was discovered by French explorers. Between 1718 and 1725, the bark was exported to France where it was used to treat an epidemic of dysentery. The bark of Simarouba species has been used by indigenous tribes as a tea to treat many diseases. The seeds of Simarouba glauca have been proposed as suitable for producing edible oils in India. Simarouba amara is harvested for timber, with its bright and lightweight timber being highly sought after in European markets to use in making fine furniture and veneers. Simarouba glauca, also known as Lakshmi Taru in India, is also valued for its wood.

== Ecology ==
The alianthus webworm (Atteva aurea) is a pest of the genus Simarouba.
