= Hannoa =

Scientific classification
- Kingdom: Plantae
- Clade: Tracheophytes
- Clade: Angiosperms
- Clade: Eudicots
- Clade: Rosids
- Order: Sapindales
- Family: Simaroubaceae
- Genus: Hannoa; Planch.

Genus of flowering plants

Hannoa is a genus of plant in the family Simaroubaceae. Found in tropical parts of Africa.

== Description ==
The genus consists of trees, shrubs or shrublets. They have leaves that are not crowded at the ends of the branches, imparipinnate. With leaflets opposite or alternate (spaced), sometimes with scattered thickenings or depressions. The flowers are unisexual or bisexual. The inflorescences are axillary or terminal or paniculate. The carpels are 1-ovulate. They have 6–9 petals, which are imbricate (overlapping). The ovary in bisexual flowers is similar but much larger. The calyx is irregularly and sometimes shallowly 2–4-lobed. They generally have a vestigial ovary in the male flowers which is sunk in the disk, of 5 carpels with very short connate styles and 5 stigmas. They normally have 10 stamens but can have up to 12–14, with 5 opposing the petals and somewhat shorter. The flower disk is thick and fleshy, ± 10-ribbed or -lobed. The fruit (or seed capsule) consists of 1–3 disruptive mericarps.

== Taxonomy ==
The genus was first published in London J. Bot. vol.5 on page 566 in 1846.

Plants of the World Online lists 2 accepted species;

- Hannoa ferruginea Engl. (syn. Quassia sanguinea)
- Hannoa schweinfurthii Oliv. (syn. Quassia schweinfurthii (Oliv.) Noot. and Simaba schweinfurthii (Oliv.) Feuillet)

It is an accepted genus by GRIN (United States Department of Agriculture and the Agricultural Research Service), but they only list 1 species, Hannoa undulata (Guill. & Perr.) Planch.

While World Flora Online lists it as a synonym of Quassia L.

== Former species ==
As listed by Plants of the World;

- Hannoa kitombetombe G.C.C.Gilbert now Odyendea gabunensis (Pierre) Engl.
- Hannoa klaineana Pierre & Engl. now Odyendea gabunensis (Pierre) Engl.
- Hannoa chlorantha (Pierre) Engl. now Odyendea klaineana (Pierre) Engl.

== Distribution ==
They are native to Cameroon, Nigeria, Sudan and Zaïre.

== Uses ==
Hannoa klaineana and Hannoa chlorantha are used in traditional medicine of Central African countries against fevers and malaria.
