= Hans Peter Nooteboom =

Dutch botanist (1934–2022)

- Born: 2 July 1934; Waingapu, Sumba, Indonesia
- Died: 20 April 2022 (aged 87); Leiden, Netherlands
- Scientific career
- Fields: botany
- Author abbrev. (botany): Noot.

Hans Peter Nooteboom (2 July 1934 – 20 April 2022) was a Dutch botanist, pteridologist, plant taxonomist, and journal editor.

== Biography ==
Born in the Dutch East Indies, Hans Nooteboom with his family returned in 1939 to the Netherlands, where he remained during WWII. After graduation from secondary school in Rotterdam, he studied biology at Leiden University. There he studied under van Steenis and Robert Hegnauer and graduated with MSc. After six years as a secondary school teacher, Nooteboom become a graduate student at Leiden University in Hegnauer's Laboratory of Experimental Plant Systematics. In 1975, Nooteboom graduated with a Ph.D. on Symplocaceae of the Old World. In 1976, he became a staff member of the Rijksherbarium, as successor to Johannes Hendrikus Kern (1903–1974). Nooteboom established an international reputation as a plant taxonomist.

... he proposed circumscriptions for the genera Leptochilus (Polypodiaceae) and Davallia (Davalliaceae) before molecular studies confirmed the unity of these groups, and he happily lumped some 50-odd recognized species under Davallia repens, well ahead of molecular studies that demonstrate the intricate structure of this mainly apomictic complex ... His broad generic concept in Magnoliaceae, initially shocking to his peers, is another example where DNA analysis has proved him right.

Nooteboom was an editor for Flora Malesiana from 1999 and had also done editorial work for Blumea and the Flora Malesiana Bulletin. As a collector for the Rijksherbarium (merged in 1999 into the National Herbarium of the Netherlands), he has made trips to "Ambon, the Andaman Islands, Aru, Kalimantan (several times), Sumatra, Sabah, Sarawak, Peninsular Malaysia, Singapore, Burma, Pakistan, China, The Philippines, Indonesia, Malaysia, Ceylon and China".

As member of the scientific committee of the foundation Keurhout and of the board of IUCN, the Netherlands he was part of missions evaluating forestry in Burma and Canada. Also he travelled to Australia, Cambodia, and Vietnam. He was secretary/ treasurer of the Netherlands foundation for international nature conservation, de van Tienhoven foundation.

Nooteboom died in Leiden on 20 April 2022, at the age of 87.

== Selected publications ==
- Nooteboom, HP; JE Vidal, A Aubréville, JF Leroy. 1977. Flore du Cambodge, du Laos et du Viêt-Nam. publ. Muséum national d'histoire naturelle. 75 pp. ISBN 2-85654-151-8
- Report of the 1982-1983 Bukit Raya expedition. publ. Rijksherbarium, Leiden
- Davalliaceae. publ. ETI, Expert Center for Taxonomic Identification, University of Amsterdam. ISBN 978-3-540-14818-0
- Berg, CC; EJH Corner, HP Nooteboom. Flora Malesiana : being an illustrated systematic account of the Malesian flora, including keys for determination, diagnostic descriptions, references to the literature, synonymy and distribution and notes on the ecology of its wild and commonly cultivate. publ. Nationaal Herbarium Nederland, Leiden. 730 pp. + CD
- Revision of the symplocaceae of the old world, New Caledonia excepted. publ. Universitaire Pers, Leiden. 30 pp. ISBN 978-90-6021-242-4
- What Should Botanists Do with Their Time?. 1988. Taxon 37(1): 134.

=== Eponyms ===
- (Elaeocarpaceae) Elaeocarpus nooteboomii Coode
- (Euphorbiaceae) Bridelia nooteboomii Chakrab.
- (Lauraceae) Cinnamomum nooteboomii Kosterm.
