= Bitter wood =

Bitter wood is a common name for several trees, all from the family Simaroubaceae, and may refer to:

- The genus Picrasma of South & South-East Asia and the Caribbean, e.g. Picrasma excelsa
- Simarouba glauca, native to Florida, the Caribbean, and Central America
- Quassia amara, native to Central and South America
