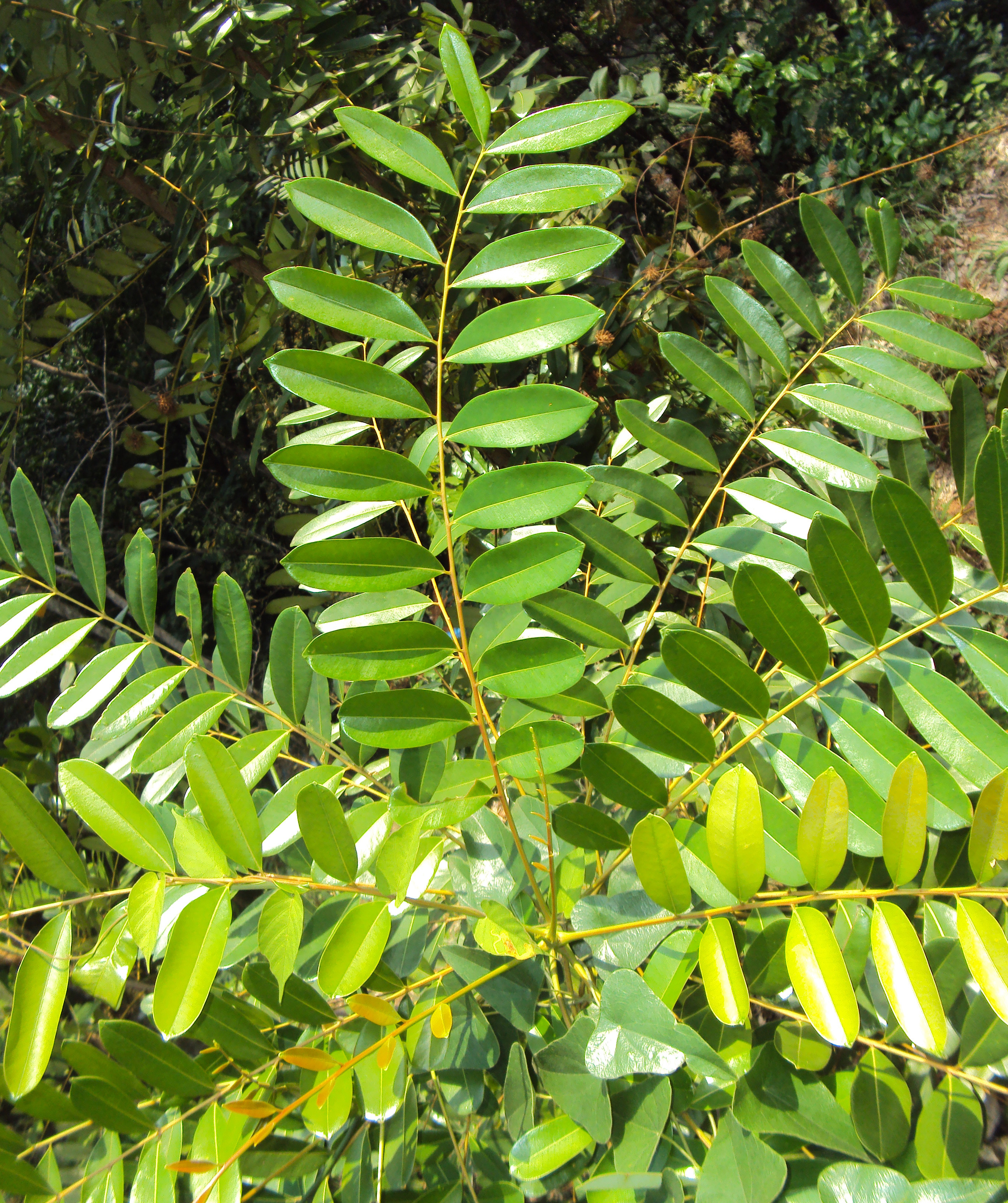

Conservation status
- Least Concern (IUCN 3.1)

Scientific classification
- Kingdom: Plantae
- Clade: Tracheophytes
- Clade: Angiosperms
- Clade: Eudicots
- Clade: Rosids
- Order: Sapindales
- Family: Simaroubaceae
- Genus: Simarouba
- Species: S. glauca

Binomial name
- Simarouba glauca DC., 1811

= Simarouba glauca =

Species of tree

Simarouba glauca is a flowering tree that is native to Florida, South America, and the Caribbean. Common names include paradise-tree, dysentery-bark, and bitterwood. The tree is well suited for warm, humid, tropical regions. Its cultivation depends on rainfall distribution, water holding capacity of the soil, and sub-soil moisture. It is suited for temperature range of 10 to 40 °C (50 to 104 °F), and can grow at elevations from sea level to 1,000 m (3,300 ft). It grows 40 to 50 ft (12 to 15 m) tall and has a span of 25 to 30 ft (7.6 to 9.1 m). It bears yellow flowers and purple elongated oval fleshy fruits.

== Cultivation ==
It can be propagated from seeds, grafting, and tissue culture technology. Fruits are collected in April and May, when they are ripe, and then dried in sun for about a week. Skin is separated, and seeds are grown in plastic bags to produce saplings. Saplings 2 to 3 months old can be transplanted to a plantation.

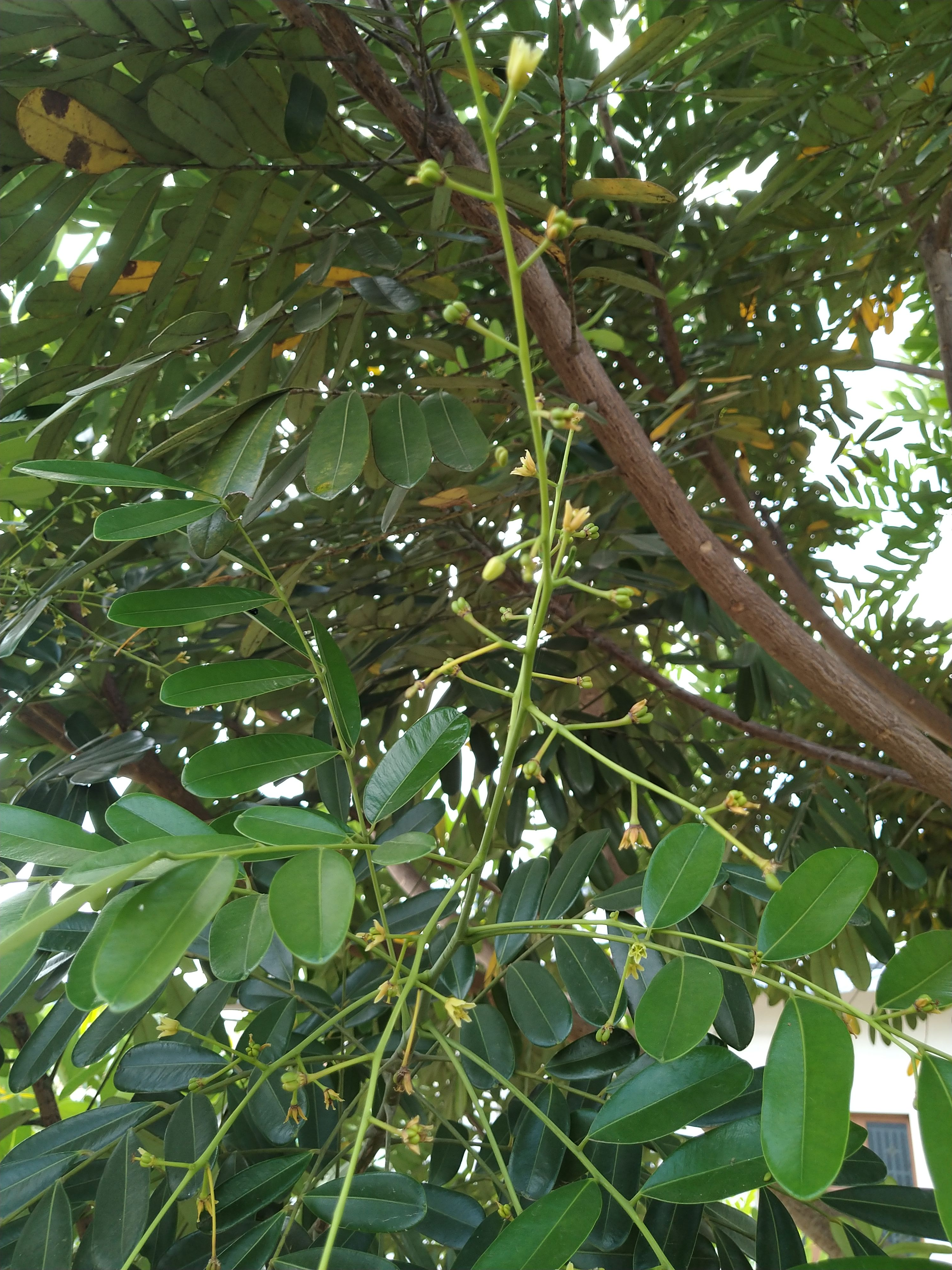
Flowers of Paradise tree

Paradise plant as decorative plant

== Use ==
The wood is generally insect resistant and is used in the preparation of quality furniture, toys, matches, and as pulp (in paper making). It also can be used for industrial purposes in the manufacture of biofuel, soaps, detergents, lubricants, varnishes, cosmetics, and pharmaceuticals.

=== Claims of medicinal properties ===
Simarouba is used for treating diarrhea, stomach upset, and malaria, among other diseases, but there is no scientifically verified evidence for its effectiveness in any of these.

== Environmental impact ==
The tree forms a well-developed root system and dense evergreen canopy that efficiently checks soil erosion, supports soil microbial life, and improves groundwater position. Besides converting solar energy into biochemical energy yearround, it checks overheating of the soil surface, particularly during summer. Large-scale planting in wastelands facilitates wasteland reclamation, converts the accumulated atmospheric carbon dioxide into oxygen, and contributes to the reduction of greenhouse effect or global warming.

== See also ==
- Bitter wood
- Quassia amara
- Picrasma excelsa
