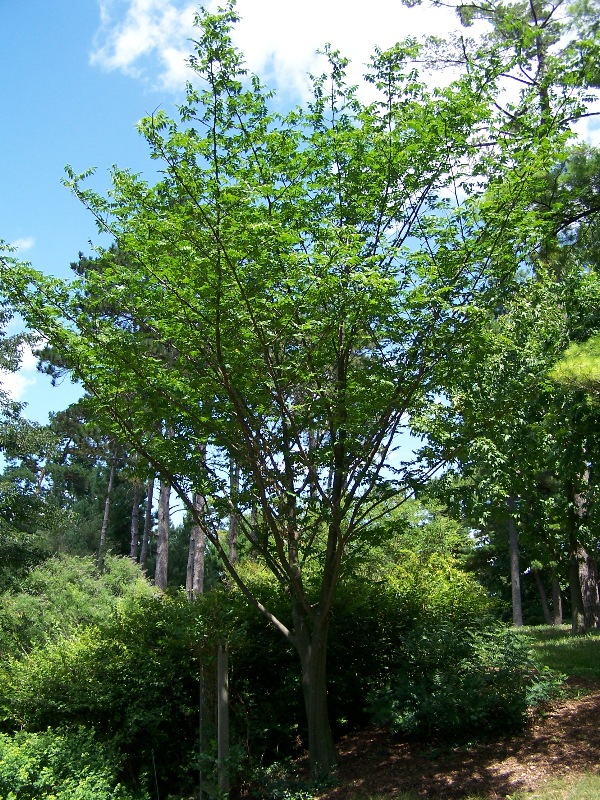
- Specimen at the Morton Arboretum; Accession 515-63-5

Scientific classification
- Kingdom: Plantae
- Clade: Tracheophytes
- Clade: Angiosperms
- Clade: Eudicots
- Clade: Rosids
- Order: Sapindales
- Family: Simaroubaceae
- Genus: Picrasma
- Species: P. quassioides

Binomial name
- Picrasma quassioides (D.Don) Benn.

= Picrasma quassioides =

Species of tree

Picrasma quassioides (picrasma; Chinese: 苦樹 ku shu, Japanese: ニガキ nigaki "bitterwood"; also India quassia, quassia wood, shurni, quassia-wood, or quassiawood; syn. P. ailanthioides) is a species of Picrasma native to temperate regions of southern Asia, from the northeast of Pakistan east along the Himalaya and through East Asia from southern, central and eastern China to Taiwan, Japan and Korea.

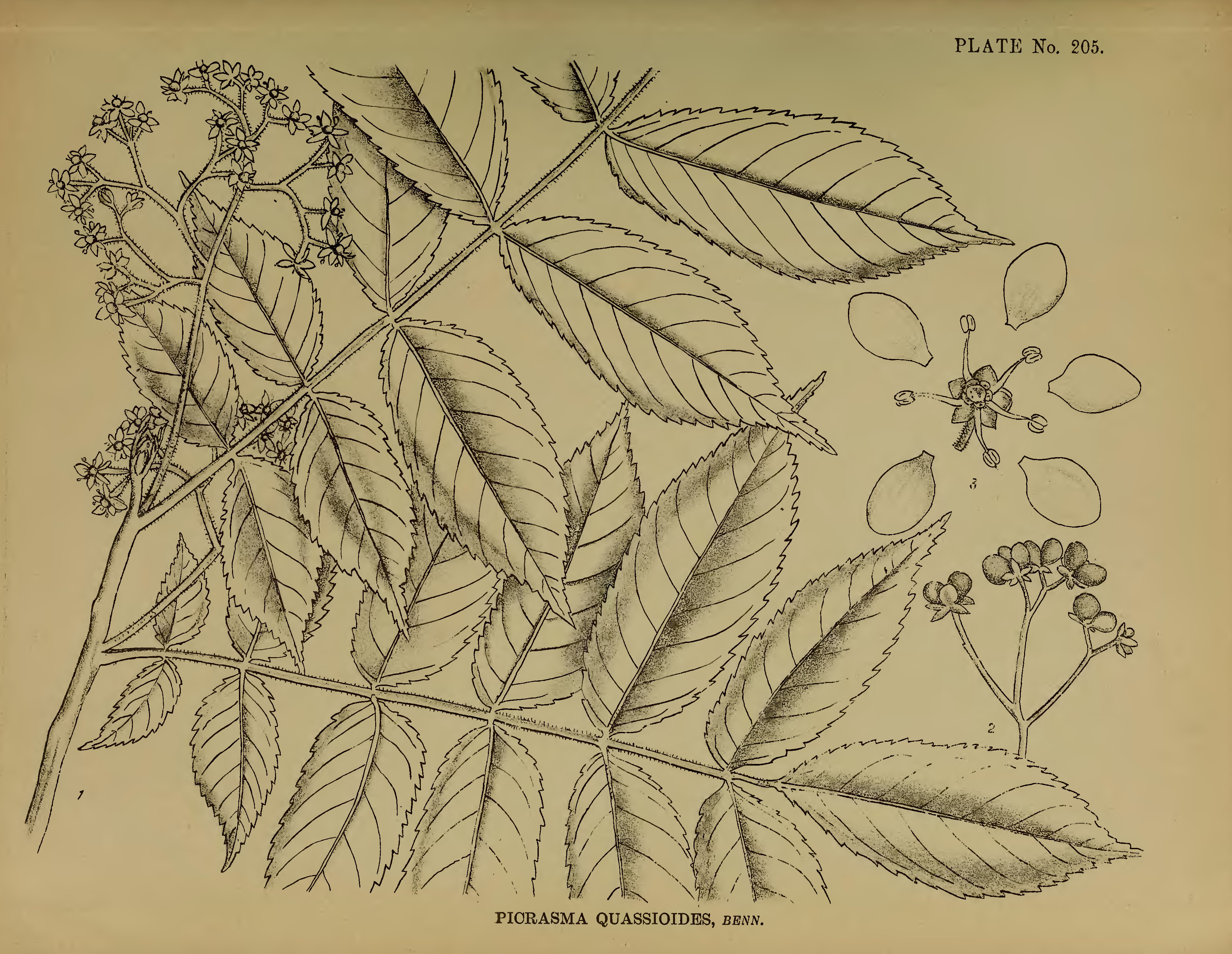
Botanical illustration of Picrasma quassoides.

It is a deciduous shrub or small tree growing to 10–15 m (rarely 20 m) tall with a trunk up to 50 cm diameter. The bark is smooth and dark grey-brown. The leaves are 15–40 cm long, pinnate, with 7–15 leaflets 2.5–10 cm long and 1.5–4.5 cm broad, with a coarsely and irregularly toothed margin. The flowers are green to yellow-green with four or five sepals and petals, produced in cymes 8–15 cm long in mid to late spring. The fruit is an ovoid to globose, red to black drupe 6–7 mm diameter.

== Cultivation and uses ==
The bark is used in herbal medicine as a bitter flavouring and antibacterial agent. Extracts from the wood are also used as a natural insecticide in organic farming.

It is occasionally grown as an ornamental tree in Europe and North America, valued for its bright orange to red autumn colour.

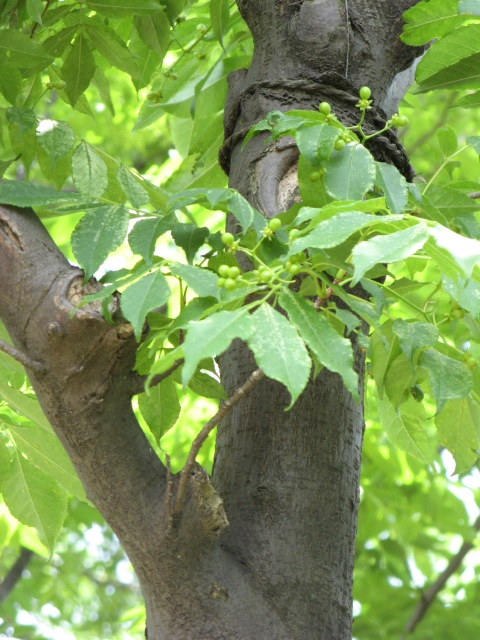
Foliage and immature fruit, Japan
