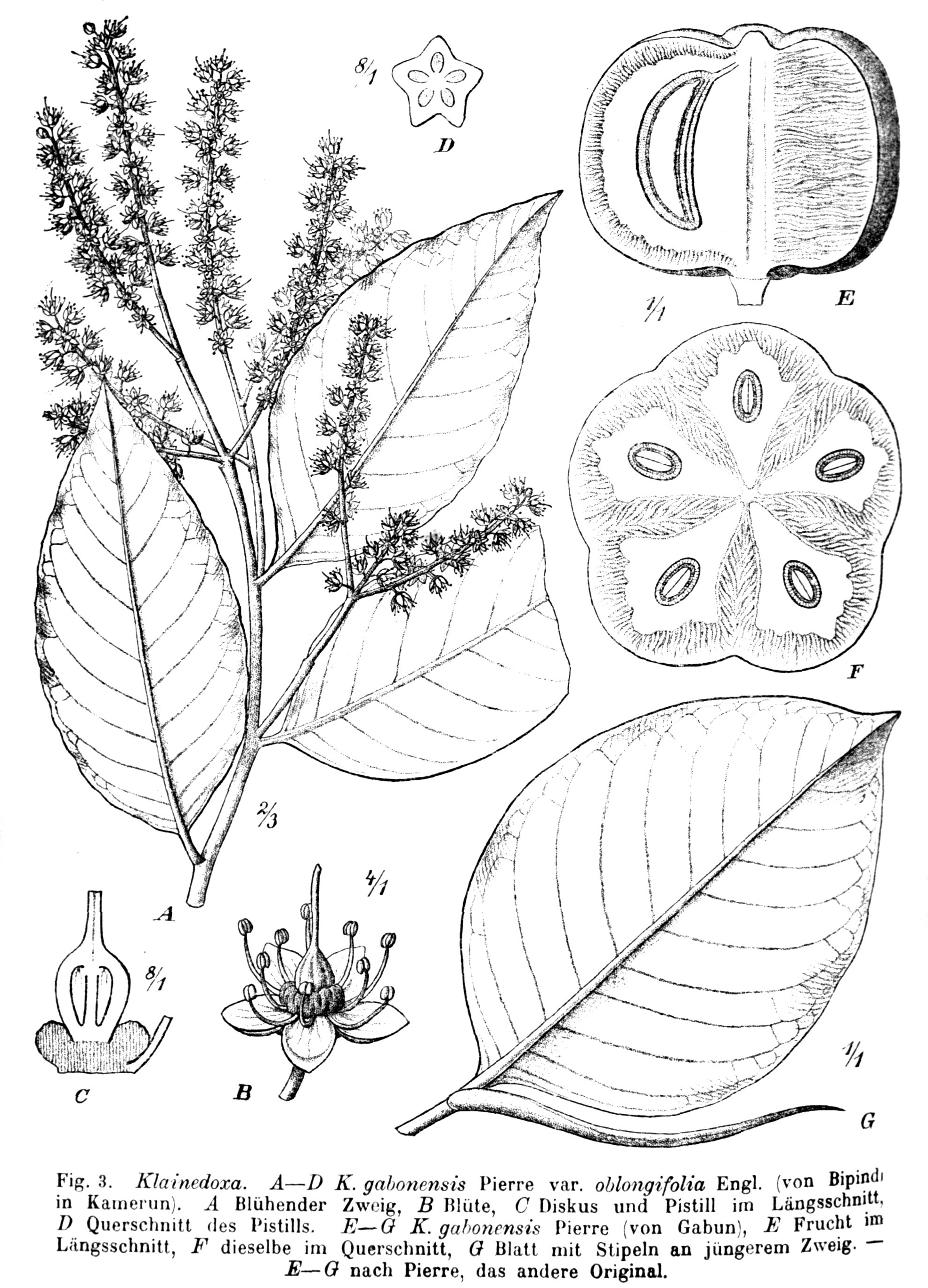
- Klainedoxa gabonensis from Engler's Botanische Jahrbucher

Conservation status
- Least Concern (IUCN 3.1)

Scientific classification
- Kingdom: Plantae
- Clade: Tracheophytes
- Clade: Angiosperms
- Clade: Eudicots
- Clade: Rosids
- Order: Malpighiales
- Family: Irvingiaceae
- Genus: Klainedoxa
- Species: K. gabonensis

Binomial name
- Klainedoxa gabonensis Pierre ex Engl.

Synonyms
- Condgiea lanceolata Baill. ex Tiegh.; Condgiea ovalifolia Baill. ex Tiegh.; Klainedoxa buesgenii Engl.; Klainedoxa cuprea Tiegh.; Klainedoxa dybowskii Tiegh.; Klainedoxa gabonensis var. microphylla Pellegr.; Klainedoxa gabonensis var. oblongifolia Engl.; Klainedoxa lanceifolia Vermoesen; Klainedoxa lanceolata Tiegh.; Klainedoxa latifolia Pierre ex Tiegh.; Klainedoxa lecomtei Tiegh.; Klainedoxa longifolia Pierre ex Tiegh.; Klainedoxa macrocarpa Tiegh.; Klainedoxa macrophylla Pierre ex Tiegh.; Klainedoxa microphylla (Pellegr.) A.H.Gentry; Klainedoxa oblongifolia (Engl.) Vermoesen; Klainedoxa oblongifolia Stapf ex Broun & R.E.Massey; Klainedoxa ovalifolia Vermoesen; Klainedoxa polyphylla Mildbr.; Klainedoxa sphaerocarpa Tiegh.; Klainedoxa spinosa Tiegh.; Klainedoxa thollonii Tiegh.; Klainedoxa tripyrena Tiegh.; Klainedoxa zenkeri Tiegh.

= Klainedoxa gabonensis =

Species of tree

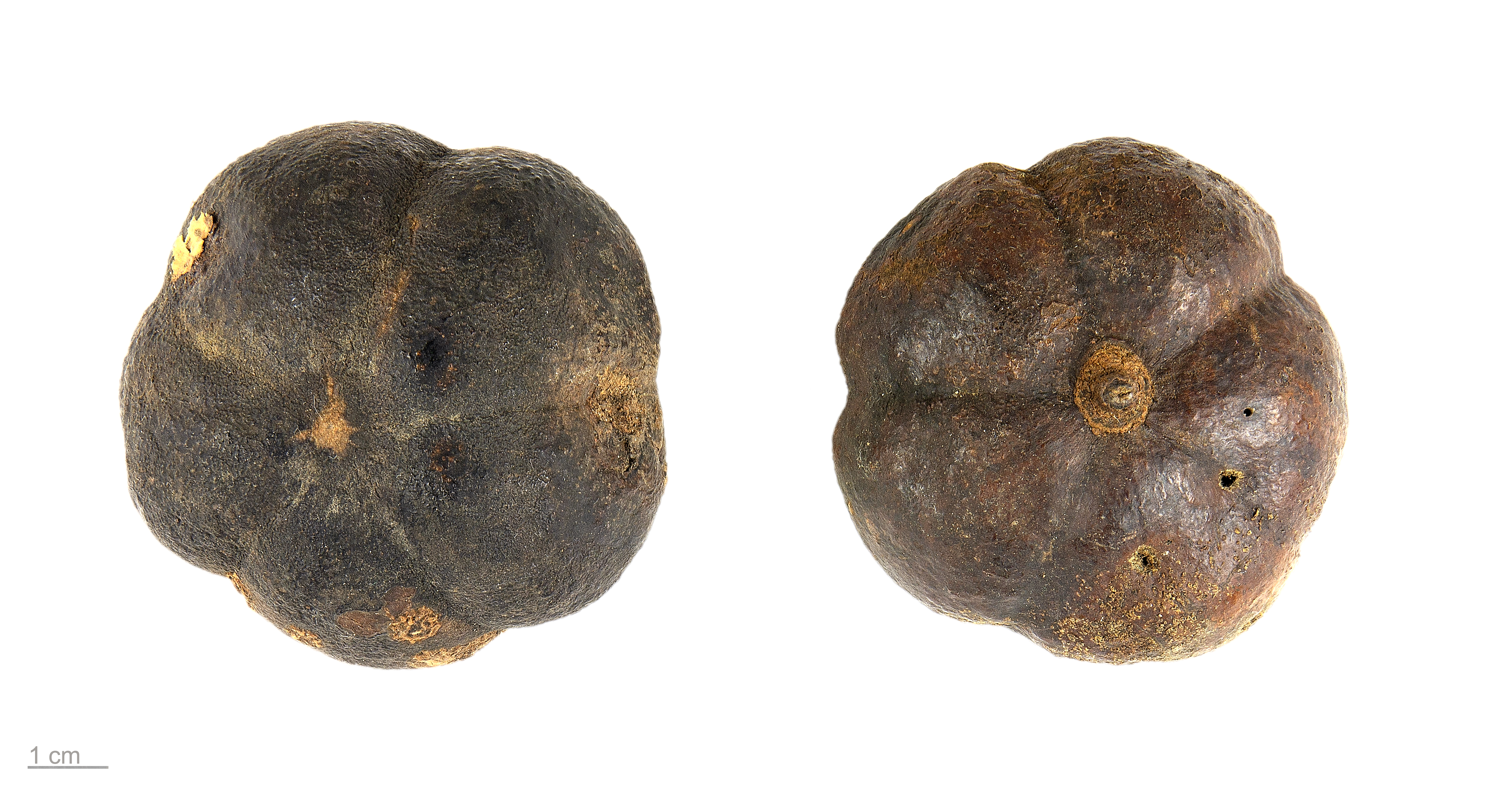
Klainedoxa gabonensis

Klainedoxa gabonensis is a large tropical African tree of the family Irvingiaceae growing to 40 m (130 ft) in height. Its straight trunk is buttressed and up to 25 m (82 ft) long, while its spreading evergreen crown makes it one of the largest trees of the rainforest. It is found from Senegal to Sudan, Cameroons, Ivory Coast, Democratic Republic of the Congo, Uganda and Tanzania, growing as far south as Angola and Zambia.

The timber is dense (0.91–1.15) and extremely hard so that cutting and local usage is very limited, but trees are still exploited for firewood. Sapwood is thin, light brown in colour, and liable to insect attack. Heartwood is reddish to golden brown with wide dark veining, and zigzag markings. Poles are resistant to rotting and are used in hut construction and to make spring traps. This tree is usually left standing when forest is cleared for agriculture and forms a prominent part of the resultant landscape. Round about October the tree produces a spectacular flush of bright red new leaves, flowering taking place at the same time and adding a purple hue. Slashed bark oozes watery, clear or amber-coloured sap with a musky smell. The cut surface is initially white, but turns purplish after oxidising. Young leaves have long linear stipules which are soon shed, and are absent on some trees.

== Medicinal ==
The bark has analgesic qualities. When ground to a fine powder and mixed with clay and water it is rubbed onto rheumatic joints. People afflicted with lumbago have the affected parts treated with bark smoke. Pulped bark is made into an ointment with palm-oil and applied to rheumatic parts, and a bark decoction is added to baths and lotions for buccal infections, smallpox and chickenpox, and taken orally for venereal disease, sterility and impotence. Tannin is present in both bark and root. Alkaloids are present in the leaves. Young leaves with stipules are eaten with palm kernels as an aphrodisiac. They are also eaten with vegetables, oil, salt, fish or meat to ease stomach ache, and are used as a topical analgesic.
