= Bitter ash =

Bitter ash is a common name for several plants and may refer to:

- Euonymus atropurpureus, native to the eastern United States and Canada
- Picrasma excelsa, native to the Caribbean
- Quassia amara, native to Central and South America
