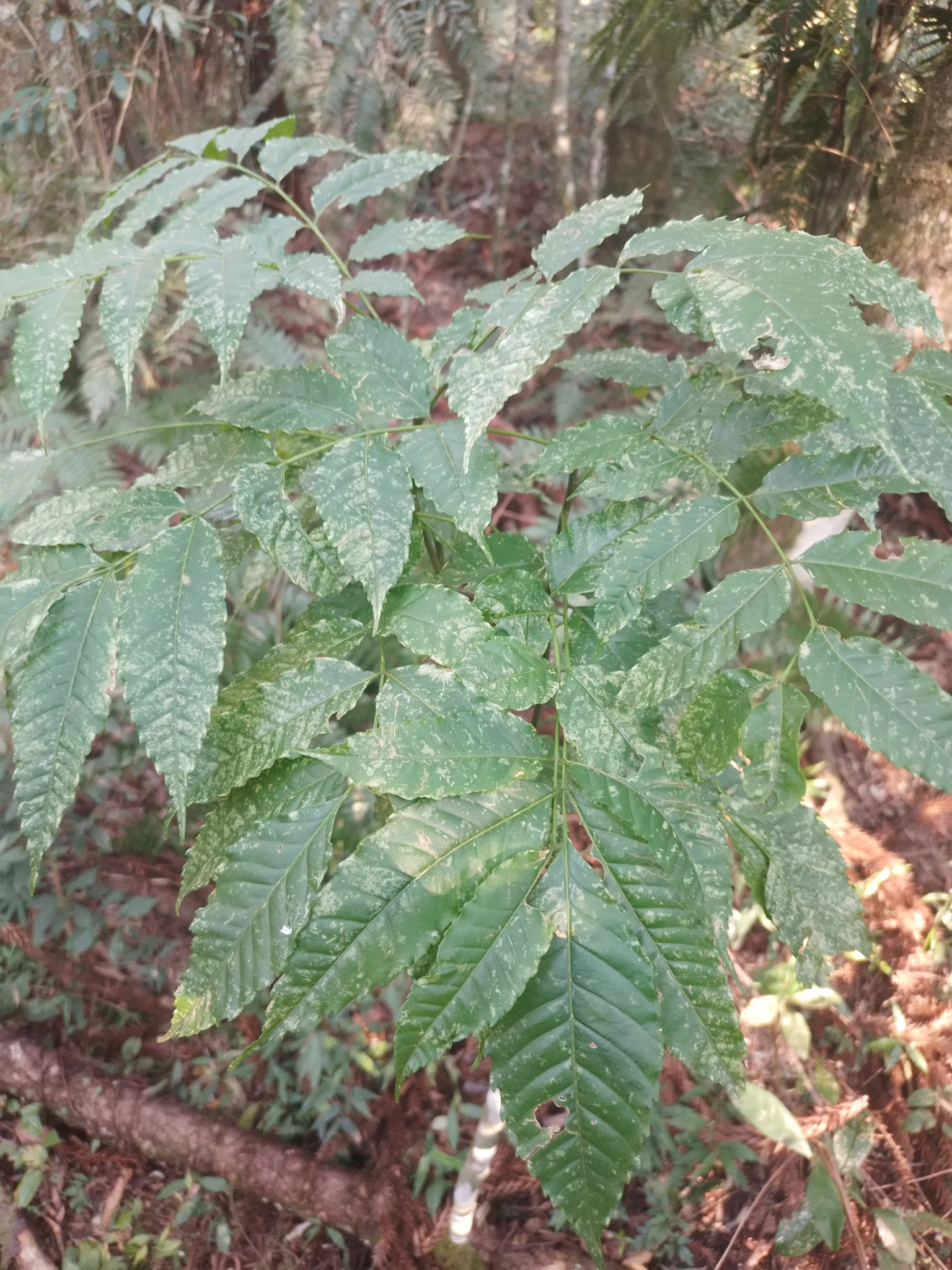

Scientific classification
- Kingdom: Plantae
- Clade: Tracheophytes
- Clade: Angiosperms
- Clade: Eudicots
- Clade: Rosids
- Order: Sapindales
- Family: Simaroubaceae
- Genus: Picrasma
- Species: P. crenata

Binomial name
- Picrasma crenata (Vell.) Engl.

Synonyms
- Aeschrion crenata Vell.; Picraena palo-amargo Speg.; Picrasma palo-amargo Speg.; Thevetia pinnata Vell.

= Picrasma crenata =

Species of tree

Picrasma crenata, the pau-amargo, pau-tenente or tenente-josé, is a tree species in the family Simaroubaceae, native to Brazil, Argentina and Paraguay. In Brazil, it grows in the Atlantic Forest in the regions of Nordeste (in Bahia state), Sudeste (in Minas Gerais, São Paulo and Rio de Janeiro states) and Sul (in Paraná, Santa Catarina and Rio Grande do Sul states).
