= Picrasma javanica =

Scientific classification
- Kingdom: Plantae
- Clade: Tracheophytes
- Clade: Angiosperms
- Clade: Eudicots
- Clade: Rosids
- Order: Sapindales
- Family: Simaroubaceae
- Genus: Picrasma
- Species: P. javanica

Binomial name
- Picrasma javanica Blume

Species of tree

Picrasma javanica is a tree in the family Simaroubaceae. The specific epithet javanica is from the Latin meaning "of Java".

== Description ==
Picrasma javanica grows up to 24 metres (80 ft) tall with a trunk diameter of up to 25 centimetres (10 in). The bark is dark and smooth. The flowers are white to yellow or green. The fruits are green to red or blue, ovoid to roundish and measure up to 1.2 cm (0.5 in) in diameter.

== Distribution and habitat ==
Picrasma javanica grows naturally from northeast India to Indochina and south to Malesia. Its habitat is rainforest from sea-level to 1,500 metres (5,000 ft) altitude.
