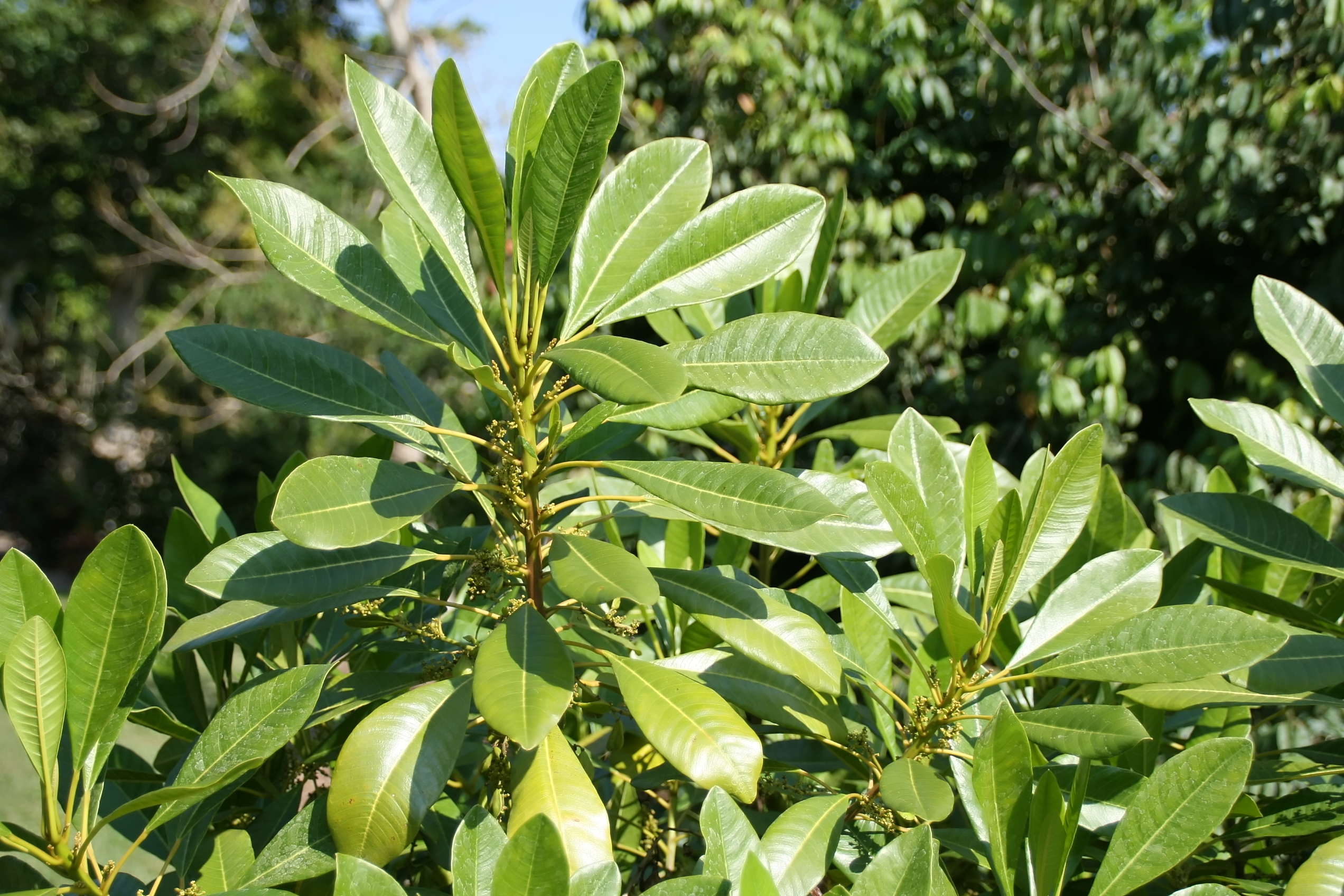
- At Fairchild Tropical Botanic Garden, Florida

Conservation status
- Least Concern (IUCN 3.1)

Scientific classification
- Kingdom: Plantae
- Clade: Tracheophytes
- Clade: Angiosperms
- Clade: Eudicots
- Clade: Rosids
- Order: Sapindales
- Family: Simaroubaceae
- Genus: Soulamea
- Species: S. amara

Binomial name
- Soulamea amara Lam.

Synonyms
- Cardiocarpus amarus (Lam.) Reinw.; Cardiophora hindsii Benth.

= Soulamea amara =

Species of flowering plant

Soulamea amara is a plant in the family Simaroubaceae. It is native to maritime Southeast Asia and some islands of the western Pacific.

== Description ==
Soulamea amara grows as a shrub or tree up to 5 m (16 ft) tall, occasionally to 15 m (50 ft) tall. The leaves are oblong to obovate and measure up to 35 cm (14 in) long and up to 12 cm (5 in) wide. The inflorescences measure up to 12 cm (5 in) long. The fruits feature a hard pericarp.

== Taxonomy ==
Soulamea amara was described in 1785 by the French naturalist Jean-Baptiste Lamarck. The specific epithet amara means 'bitter', referring to the taste of plant parts.

== Distribution and habitat ==
Soulamea amara is native to Borneo, the Maluku Islands, New Guinea, the Bismarck Archipelago, the Solomon Islands, the Caroline Islands, the Marshall Islands and Vanuatu. Its habitat is on or near beaches and coral reefs.

== Conservation ==
Soulamea amara has been assessed as least concern on the IUCN Red List. The species is broadly distributed. However, it is threatened by deforestation and by conversion of land in its habitat for agriculture and plantations. The species' presence in any protected areas is unknown.

== Uses ==
The fruit and roots of Soulamea amara are used locally in traditional medicine to treat some digestive, respiratory and skin conditions. The bitterness of the fruit can be used to induce vomiting.
