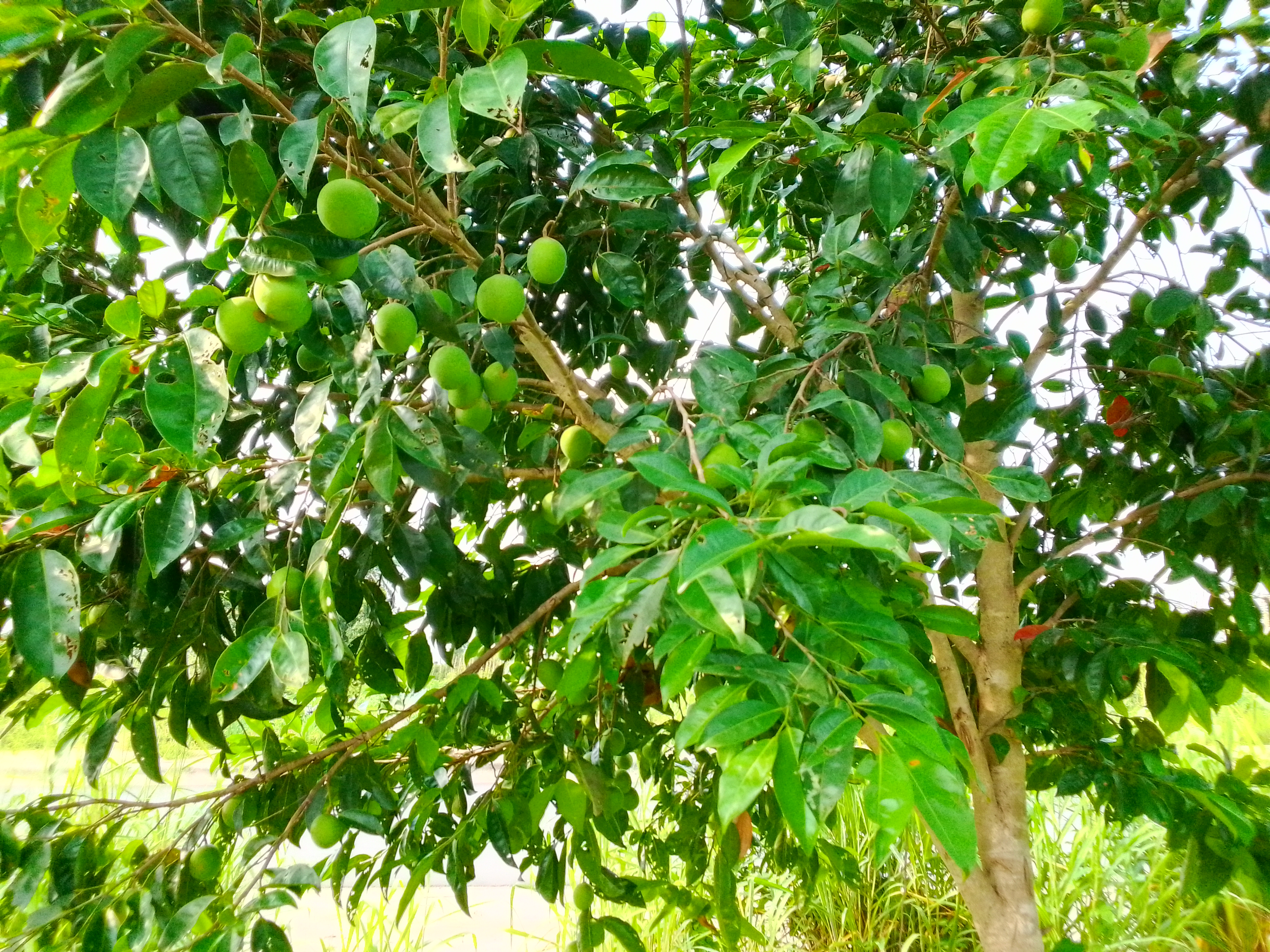

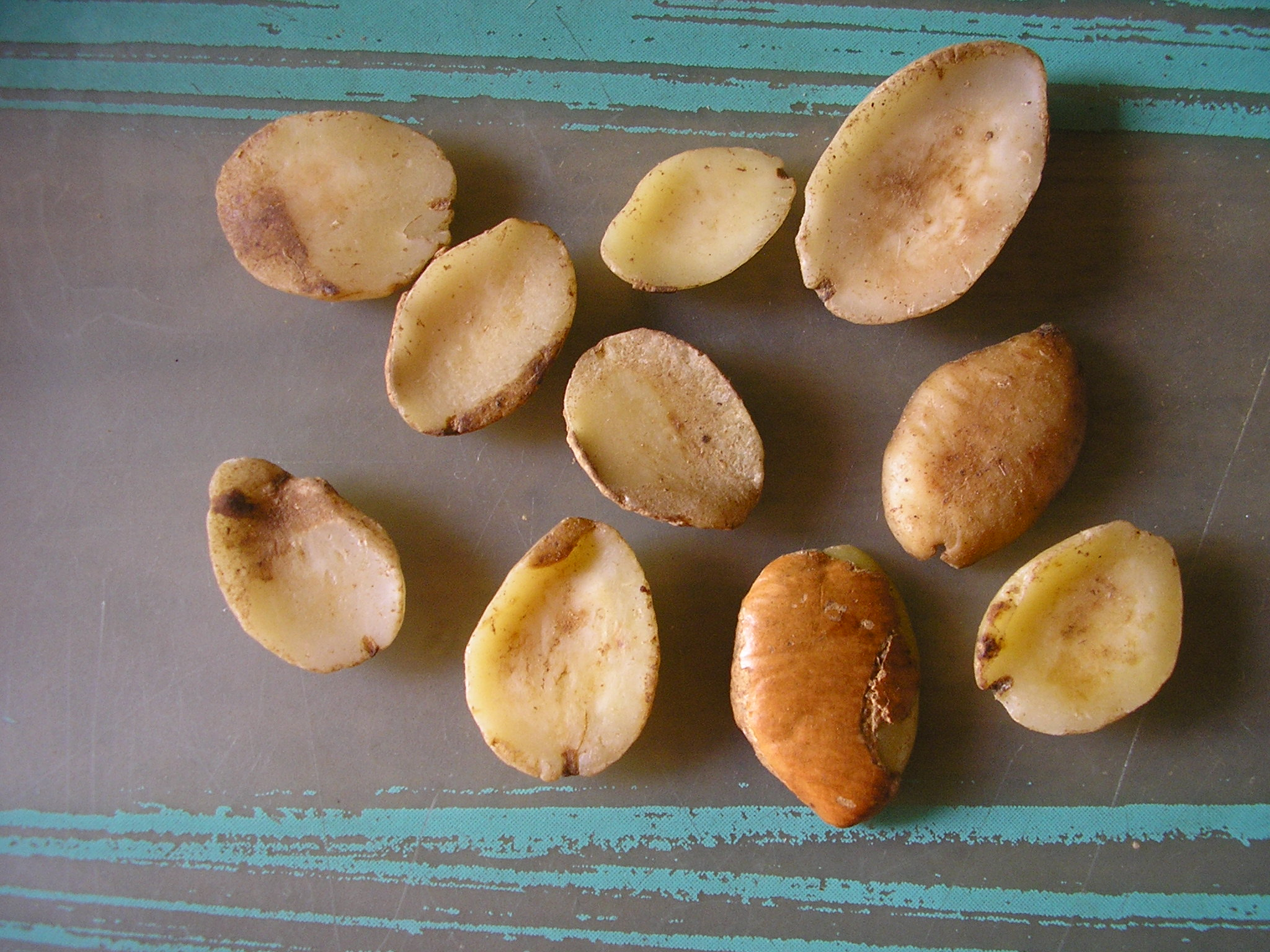
- Ogbono nuts

Conservation status
- Near Threatened (IUCN 2.3)

Scientific classification
- Kingdom: Plantae
- Clade: Tracheophytes
- Clade: Angiosperms
- Clade: Eudicots
- Clade: Rosids
- Order: Malpighiales
- Family: Irvingiaceae
- Genus: Irvingia
- Species: I. gabonensis

Binomial name
- Irvingia gabonensis (Aubry-Lecomte ex O'Rorke) Baill.
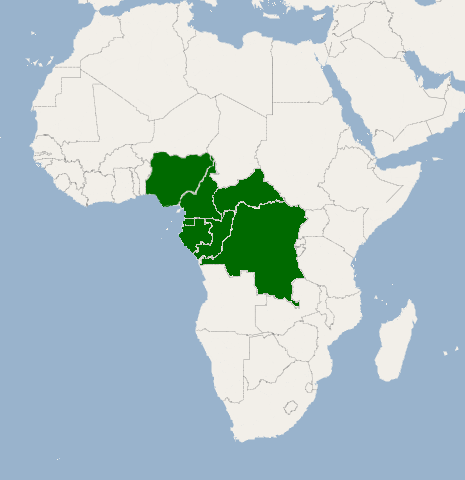
- Natural occurrence of Irvingia gabonensis in Africa

Synonyms
- Irvingia barteri Hook.f. Irvingia caerulea Tiegh. Irvingia duparquetii Tiegh. Irvingia erecta Tiegh. Irvingia fusca Tiegh. Irvingia griffonii Tiegh. Irvingia hookeriana Tiegh. Irvingia laeta Tiegh. Irvingia pauciflora Tiegh. Irvingia platycarpa Tiegh. Irvingia tenuifolia Hook.f. Irvingia velutina Tiegh.

= Irvingia gabonensis =

Species of tree

Irvingia gabonensis is a species of African trees in the genus Irvingia, sometimes known by the common names wild mango, African mango, or bush mango. They bear edible mango-like fruits, and are especially valued for their fat- and protein-rich nuts.

== Description ==
Irvingia gabonensis grows straight, up to a height of 40 m (130 ft) and 1 m (3 ft 3 in) in diameter. It has buttresses to a height of 3m (10 ft). The outer bark is smooth to scaly with grey to yellow-grey color. The crown is evergreen, spherical and dense. Leaves are elliptic, one margin is often a little rounder than the other, acuminate, dark green and glossy on the upper surface. The bisexual flowers are yellow to greenish-white in small panicles. The fruit is nearly spherical, green when ripe with a bright orange pulp. The stone is woody and contains one seed. Seeds germinate epigeally (above ground).

== Distribution and habitat ==
Irvingia gabonensis is indigenous to the humid forest zone from the northern tip of Angola, including Congo, DR Congo, Cameroon, Nigeria, Ivory Coast and south-western Uganda. Since 2009, the Gabonese government has prohibited logging of the andok tree until 2034.

The tree grows in tropical wet and in dry climates. African bush mango grows naturally in canopied jungle, gallery forests and semi-deciduous forests. It grows at altitudes from 200–500 m (660–1,640 ft) with annual rainfalls from 1,200–1,500 mm (47–59 in). Supported temperature ranges from 20–38 °C (68–100 °F). Soils more than 150 cm (59 in) deep are needed, with a moderate fertility and good drainage. pH can range from 4.5 to 7.5.

== Ecology ==
Irvingia gabonensis is insect-pollinated by Coleoptera, Diptera, Hymenoptera and Lepidoptera. It flowers from March to June and has two fruiting seasons: from April to July and from September to October. Seeds are dispersed by vertebrates, including elephants and gorillas. With a reduction in the number of those animals, the spread and regeneration of African bush mango decreases and it becomes more dependent on human planting.

== Cultivation ==
In the past, 90% of African bush mango products were harvested from scattered, wild trees. African bush mango trees were not cultivated initially, because it was believed, that it took up to 15 years for a tree to bear fruit. Although they were not artificially planted, their occurrence was high because they were also rarely harvested for timber. In a plantation using marcots (air-layering plants), flower production was observed within two to four years after planting. Germination from seeds is low and when they are not handled appropriately, most fail. The seeds are mostly extracted by breaking fruits by hand.

=== Breeding ===
The domestication of African bush mango is in its early stages. Around 1990, vegetative propagation allowed mass replication and selection. Grafting, budding, air-layering, marcotting and cuttings are feasible when they are applied to young wood.

== Uses ==
The fruits are often eaten fresh by humans and other mammals such as monkeys, gorillas, elephants and many more. As it is naturally and predominantly found in parts of Africa, it has been popularly called African mango. The fruits are processed into jelly, jam, juice and sometimes even wine. The pulp has also been used to prepare black dye for cloth coloration.

The seed coat has to be cracked open to get to the endosperm. Seeds, also called dika nuts, are eaten raw or roasted. Mostly however they are pounded to butter- or a chocolate-like block. Seeds can be pressed to produce an edible oil (solid at ambient temperatures) or margarine used for cooking. The oil can also be processed further to soap or cosmetics. The press cake can be used as cattle feed or as thickening agent for soup. Seeds can be ground or crushed and used as a thickening and flavoring agent in soups and stews. They can also be made into a cake called "dika bread" for preservation.

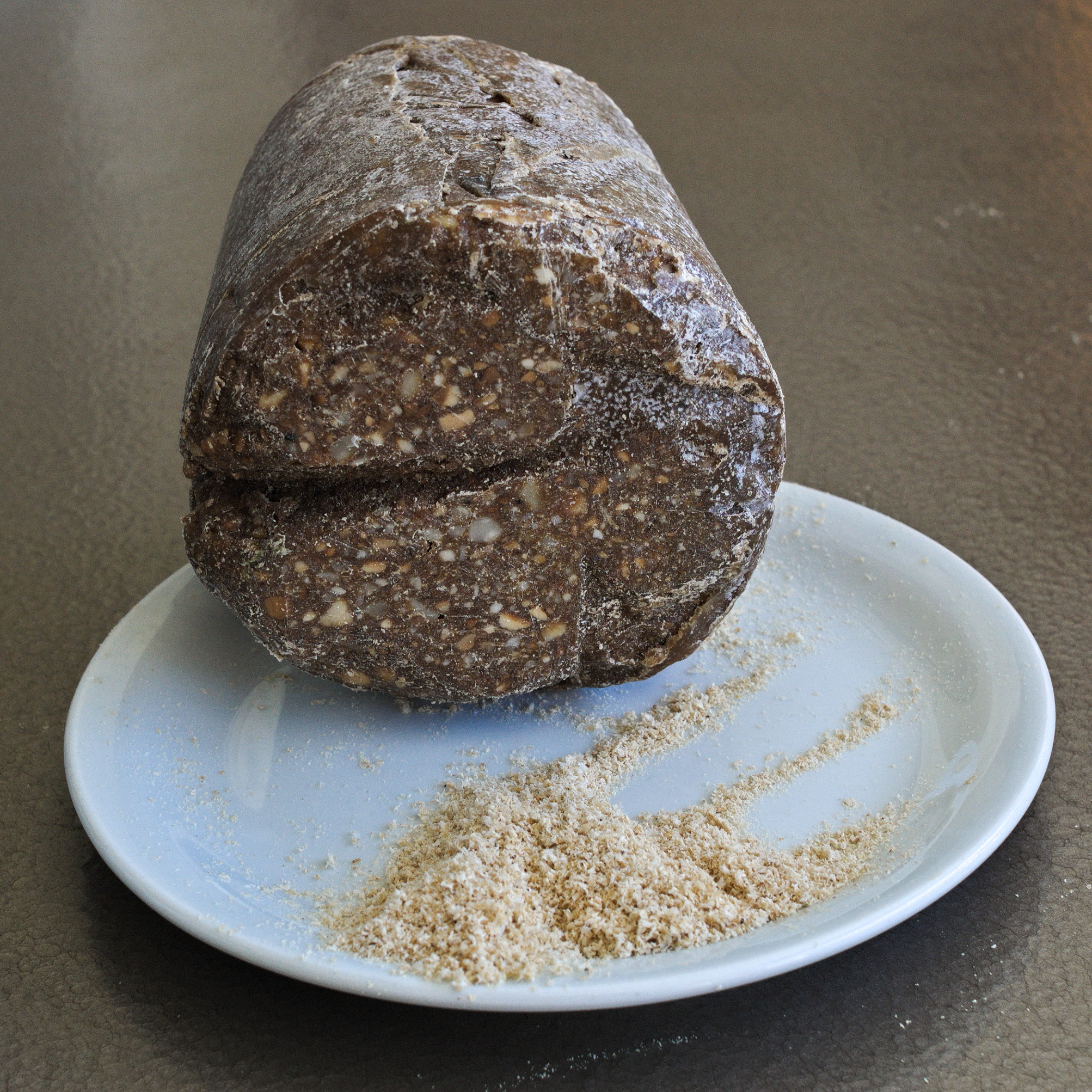
Dika bread

The nuts are often used in the Gabonese cuisine to season poultry and meat dishes, such as the poulet à l'odika. The ground nuts provide a smoked scent to the meals.

The wood is hard and therefore used for heavy construction work as making ships' decks or railway ties. Dead branches are used as firewood.

The trees are used in agroforestry systems to shade other crops, especially cocoa and coffee. They are also used to reduce erosion. Cities have started using them to shade streets, as shelter belts, or for beautification.

Thousands of tons of African bush mango seeds are traded each year, mostly within Africa.

=== Nutrition ===
The edible seeds provide 697 calories in a 100 gram portion and the following nutrients:

| Fat | 67 g |
| Carbohydrate | 15 g |
| Protein | 8.5 g |
| Water | 4 g |
| Calcium | 120 mg |
| Iron | 2.4 mg |

The approximate fatty acid composition in seeds includes myristic acid (33–70%), lauric acid (20–59%), oleic acid (1–11%), palmitic acid (2%) and stearic acid (1%).

Unlike the pulp of some other Irvingia spp., the pulp of Irvingia gabonensis tastes juicy and sweet and is eaten fresh. A 100 gram portion of fruit pulp provides 61 calories and includes:

| Water | 81 g |
| Carbohydrate | 15.7 g |
| Protein | 0.9 g |
| Fat | 0.2 g |
| Phosphorus | 40 mg |
| Calcium | 20 mg |
| Vitamin C | 7 mg |
| Iron | 2 mg |

Fruit pulp flavor components include zingiberene, cinnamic acid, dodecanal and dodecanol, resulting in spicy, earthy, fruity, and wine-yeast characteristics.

=== Weight control ===
Food supplements from Irvingia gabonensis, under the name "African mango" are marketed for management of body weight. Clinical trials to date have not confirmed their efficacy, although a meta-analysis concluded that Irvingia gabonensis showed "some potential benefit for weight loss", stating that "it appears to be safe and well tolerated as the most common adverse effects are headache, flatulence, and difficulty sleeping" but that "due to the limited data, Irvingia gabonensis cannot be recommended at this time."
