= Soulamea soulameoides =

Scientific classification
- Kingdom: Plantae
- Clade: Tracheophytes
- Clade: Angiosperms
- Clade: Eudicots
- Clade: Rosids
- Order: Sapindales
- Family: Simaroubaceae
- Genus: Soulamea
- Species: S. soulameoides

Binomial name
- Soulamea soulameoides (A.Gray) Noot. (1963)

Synonyms
- Amaroria soulameoides A.Gray (1853)

Species of flowering plant

Soulamea soulameoides is a species of flowering plant belonging to the family Simaroubaceae. It is a small dioecious tree endemic to Fiji.
