= Allantospermum borneense =

Scientific classification
- Kingdom: Plantae
- Clade: Tracheophytes
- Clade: Angiosperms
- Clade: Eudicots
- Clade: Rosids
- Order: Malpighiales
- Family: Irvingiaceae
- Genus: Allantospermum
- Species: A. borneense

Binomial name
- Allantospermum borneense Forman

Species of tree

Allantospermum borneense is a tree in the family Irvingiaceae. The specific epithet borneense is from the Latin meaning "of Borneo".

== Description ==
Allantospermum borneense grows as a large tree up to 90 metres (300 ft) tall with a trunk diameter of up to 60 centimetres (24 in) and large, spreading buttresses. The mostly smooth bark is pale brown with grey patches. The twigs are brown and slender. The flowers are white. The ellipsoid fruits measure up to 4.2 cm (2 in) long.

== Distribution and habitat ==
Allantospermum borneense grows naturally in Peninsular Malaysia and Borneo. Its main habitat is mixed dipterocarp forest.
