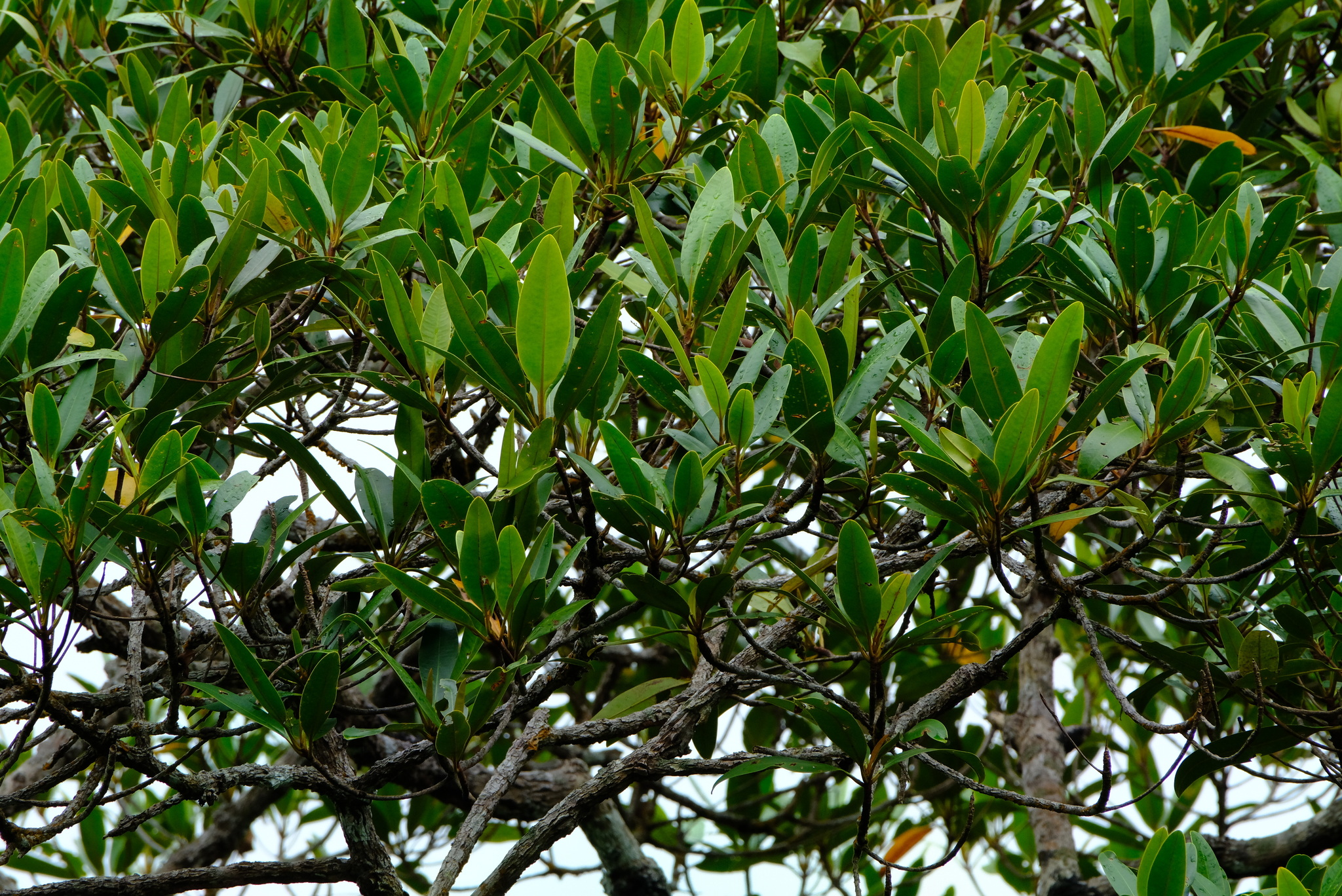

Conservation status
- Vulnerable (IUCN 3.1)

Scientific classification
- Kingdom: Plantae
- Clade: Tracheophytes
- Clade: Angiosperms
- Clade: Eudicots
- Clade: Rosids
- Order: Sapindales
- Family: Simaroubaceae
- Genus: Soulamea
- Species: S. terminalioides

Binomial name
- Soulamea terminalioides Baker

= Soulamea terminalioides =

Species of flowering plant

Soulamea terminalioides is a species of plant in the family Simaroubaceae. It is endemic to Seychelles.
