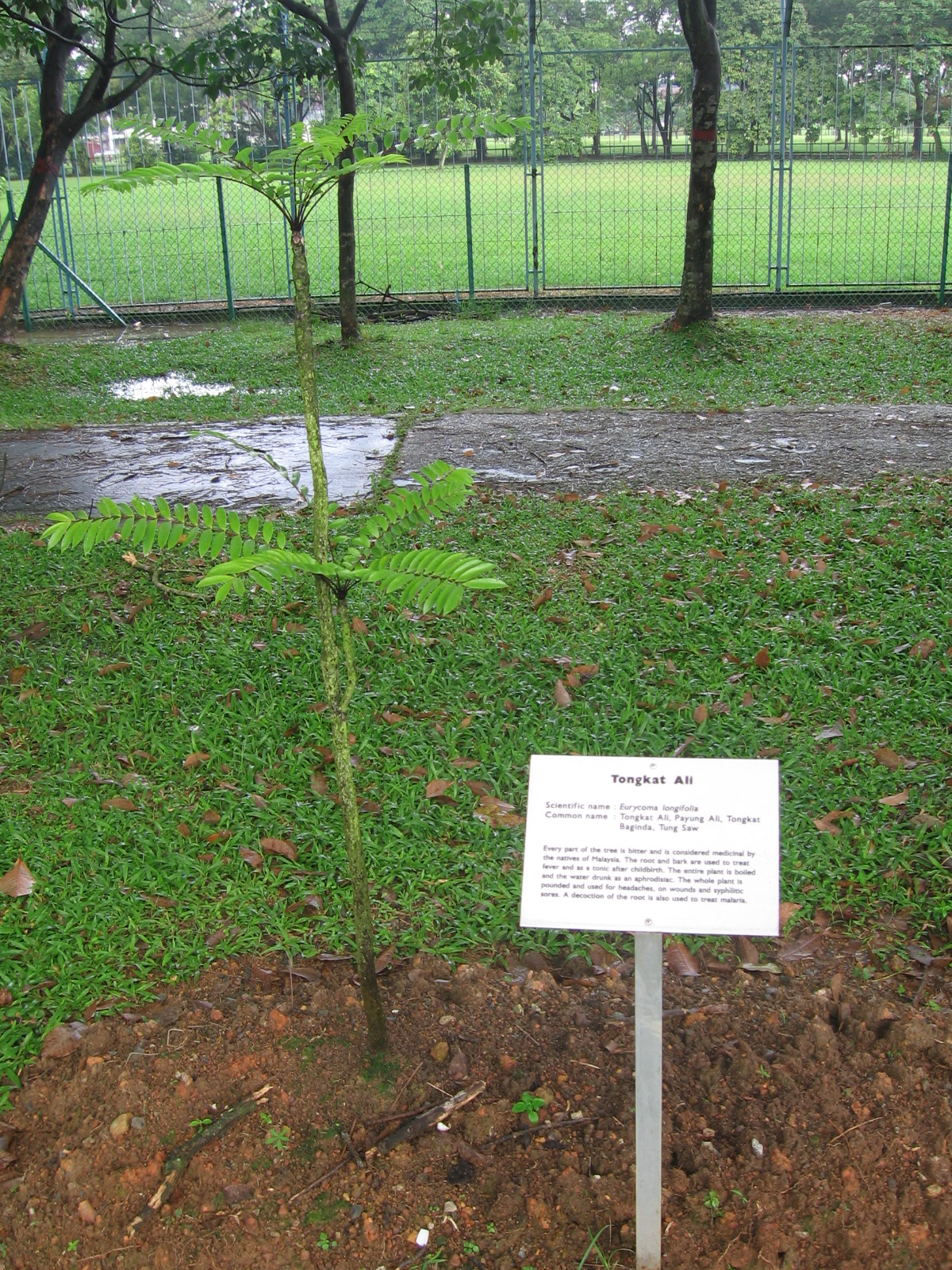

Conservation status
- Least Concern (IUCN 3.1)

Scientific classification
- Kingdom: Plantae
- Clade: Tracheophytes
- Clade: Angiosperms
- Clade: Eudicots
- Clade: Rosids
- Order: Sapindales
- Family: Simaroubaceae
- Genus: Eurycoma
- Species: E. longifolia

Binomial name
- Eurycoma longifolia Jack

= Eurycoma longifolia =

Species of flowering plant

Eurycoma longifolia (commonly called tongkat ali, Malaysian ginseng or long jack) is a flowering plant in the family Simaroubaceae. It is native to Mainland South Asia (Cambodia, Laos, Malaysia, Myanmar, Thailand and Vietnam) and Indonesia (the islands of Borneo and Sumatra), but has also been found in the Philippines. The plant is a medium-sized slender shrub that can reach 10 m (33 ft) in height, and is often unbranched.

The root has been used in traditional medicine in Southeast Asia over centuries. It is also a widely used dietary supplement by bodybuilders, who believe that it increases testosterone levels and athletic performance, although there is no clinical evidence for its effectiveness on health or any disease. Rare cases of liver injury have occurred from its use, mostly in bodybuilders.

== Common names ==
Eurycoma longifolia is also known by the common names penawar pahit, penawar bias, bedara merah, bedara putih, lempedu pahit, payong ali, tongkat baginda, muntah bumi, petala bumi, bidara laut (all Malay-Indonesian); babi kurus (Javanese); cây bá bệnh (Vietnamese); tho nan (Laotian); lan-don, hae phan chan, phiak, plaa lai phuenk, tung saw (all Thai); "long jack" (US); langir siam (Bahrain). Many of the common names refer to the plant's medicinal use and extreme bitterness. Penawar pahit translates simply as "bitter charm" or "bitter medicine". Older literature, such as a 1953 article in the Journal of Ecology, may cite only penawar pahit as the plant's common Malay name.

E. longifolia is known by common names "tongkat ali" and "pasak bumi" in the South East Asian region, but these names are also used for similar species, Polyalthia bullata. The bark and root of E. longifolia is more white/yellow-ish compared to the darker-colored P. bullata, which has led to the former being known as "tongkat ali/pasak bumi putih" or "tongkat ali/pasak bumi kuning", and the latter as "tongkat ali/pasak bumi hitam". ("Putih" means "white", "kuning" means "yellow", and "hitam" means "black" in Malay/Indonesian.) Indonesia also has a red-coloured variety known as "tongkat ali/pasak bumi merah" ("merah" meaning "red"), which is being studied by researchers and has not had its species classified.

Eurycoma longifolia is also known by the species name Eurycoma longifolia Jack, as this was the name used by botanist William Jack in his taxonomical description published in 1822.

Eurycoma longifolia is informally known as "Malaysian ginseng" (though not a ginseng but considered to have some similar effects).

== Description ==
A medium size slender shrub reaching 10 m (33 ft), often unbranched with reddish brown petioles. Leaves compound, even pinnate reaching 1 m (39 in) meter in length. Each compound leaf consists of 30 to 40 leaflets, lanceolate to obovate-lanceolate. Each leaflet is about 15–20 cm (6–8 in) long, 1.5–6 cm (1–2 in) wide, and much paler on the ventral side.

The inflorescence axillary is a large brownish red panicle, pubescent with fine, soft, granular trichomes. Flowers are dioecious. Petals are pubescent. The drupe is hard, ovoid, yellowish brown when young, and brownish red when ripe. The plant grows in the understorey of lowland forests, and survives on a variety of soils, but prefers acidic, well-drained soil.

== Uses ==
The plant is used in the traditional medicine of Indonesia, Malaysia and Vietnam where the root of the plant is boiled in water, and the water is consumed as a tonic. The flower and fruits are used to treat dysentery, and the root is used for malaria, fever, and other ailments.

=== Dietary supplement ===
In the United States, the extract for use in dietary supplements has self-affirmed generally recognized as safe (GRAS) status, as an ingredient. Supplemental use occurs in various forms, such as root powders, an additive in tea or coffee, and capsules alone or in combination with other ingredients. It is commonly used by bodybuilders or other sports participants in the belief the compound can increase testosterone levels that would improve performance.

Available clinical research has found no significant effect of E. longifolia as a supplement. It is under preliminary research for erectile dysfunction, immunomodulation, and other effects. Side effects of using supplements may include nausea, abdominal discomfort, diarrhea, or headaches. Rare cases of liver injury have occurred from its use, mostly in bodybuilders. E. longifolia supplements should not be used during pregnancy. Its long-term safety over regular use has not been adequately assessed.

== Commercialization ==
=== Adulteration and contamination ===
There are numerous cases of products falsely claiming to contain E. longifolia as an ingredient, as well as E. longifolia product contamination cases. In 2006, the U.S. Food and Drug Administration (FDA) banned seven dietary supplement products that claimed to include E. longifolia as a principal ingredient, but which additionally contained prescription drugs and even analogs of prescription drugs that have not yet been tested for safety in humans, such as acetildenafil.

In 2017, the FDA announced that two different brands of E. longifolia-containing coffee were recalled after being found to be adulterated with active ingredients from erectile dysfunction drugs.

In Malaysia, there are over 200 registered E. longifolia products. However, a 2004 study determined, following quality testing, that 36% of these were contaminated with mercury beyond legally permitted limits.

=== Extracts ===
Products stating various E. longifolia extract ratios of 1:50, 1:100, and 1:200 are common on the market. However, extracts based on this ratio system are often misleading and hard to verify. Scientific research done on herbal products in general indicates that in many cases the content of bioactive constituents varies between products.

Another option is for extraction techniques to use standardization methods to monitor the bioactive content and quality of the extract against standardization markers. Among standardization markers that have been used for E. longifolia are eurycomanone, total protein, total polysaccharide and glycosaponin, which have been recommended in a technical guideline developed by the Scientific and Industrial Research Institute of Malaysia.

=== Conservation and sustainability ===
E. longifolia is mainly used for its roots, which necessitates uprooting the entire plant when it is harvested. This has led to concerns over the long-term sustainability of its use.

In Malaysia raw E. longifolia is banned from export, and the plant itself been listed as one of the priority species for conservation, and the harvesting of wild trees is restricted according to Act 686 on International Trade in Endangered Species. In 2016, Ahmad Shabery Cheek, the Malaysian Minister of Agriculture, said that the species may go extinct within twenty years if cultivation and replanting efforts are not made quickly. To support commercialization, the Malaysian government made attempts to encourage the long-term commercial cultivation of the plant, through the provision of grants for farmers, enabling agronomy research by MARDI, and the formation of cluster farms under the East Coast Economic Region.

== Phytochemicals ==
Chemical analyses of extracts have revealed some 65 phytochemicals, including saponins, alkaloids, polyphenols, coumarin, tannins, triterpenes, and the glycoprotein compounds, eurycomanol, eurycomanone, and eurycomalactone.

== See also ==
- Labisia pumila
- Quassinoid
