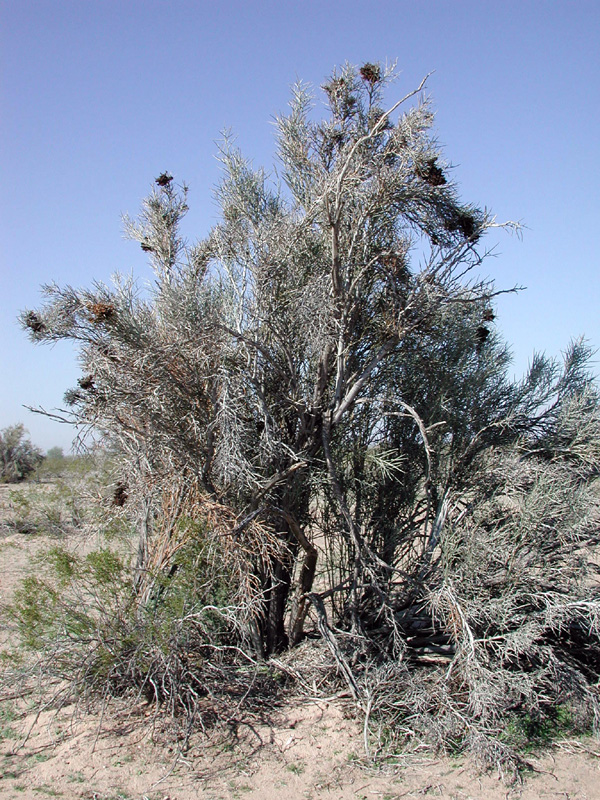

Conservation status
- Apparently Secure (NatureServe)

Scientific classification
- Kingdom: Plantae
- Clade: Tracheophytes
- Clade: Angiosperms
- Clade: Eudicots
- Clade: Rosids
- Order: Sapindales
- Family: Simaroubaceae
- Genus: Castela
- Species: C. emoryi

Binomial name
- Castela emoryi (A.Gray) Moran & Felger; Transactions of the San Diego Society of Natural History 15(4):40. 1968

Synonyms
- Holacantha emoryi A. Gray

= Castela emoryi =

Species of plant

Castela emoryi, with the common names crucifixion thorn, Emory's crucifixion-thorn, and Spanish: chaparro amargosa, is a shrub species in the genus Castela of the family Simaroubaceae.

== Distribution ==
Bureau of Land Management sign at a castela emoryi preserve in California

The plant is native to the Mojave Desert and Sonoran Deserts of North America.

It is found in southern California, Arizona, and Sonora state (México).

The species is dioecious and occurs in the moistest areas in the hottest, driest deserts within its range; it is considered poor in germination.

== Description ==
Castela emoryi is often less than 1 metre (3.3 ft), and occasionally to grows 4 metres (13 ft) or more.

Crucifixion thorn is mostly leafless, its sharp branches are green and perform photosynthesis. Seeds are contained in clusters of fruit in groups of 5. The fruit is tan, green, red or brown in color, turning black with age, and may persist on the tree for several years.

It is ranked on the California Native Plant Society Inventory of Rare and Endangered Plants, as an endangered species within California, and more common elsewhere. It is threatened by solar energy development and military activities within its California range. The species is classified as "Salvage restricted" in Arizona.

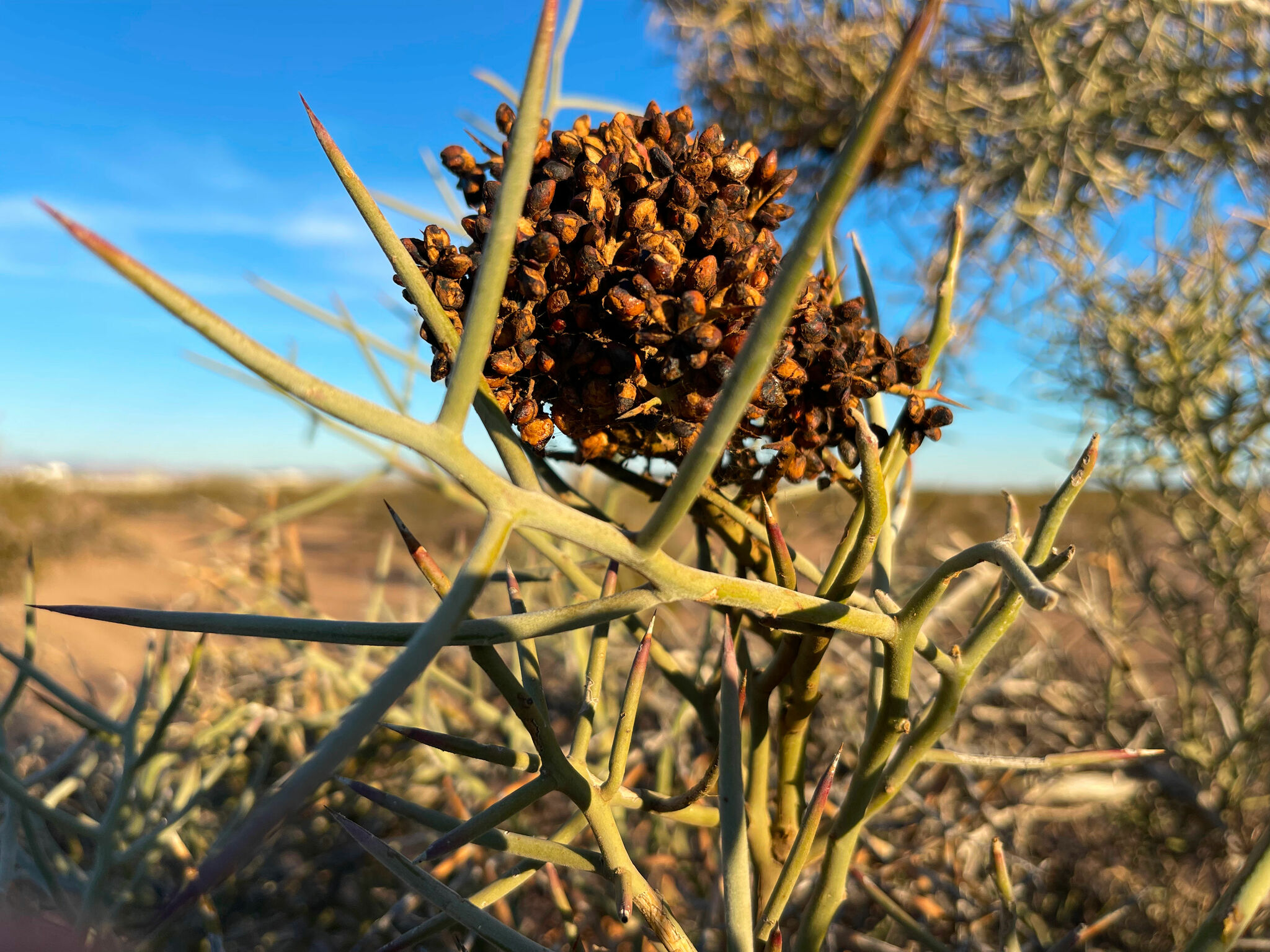
green thorns

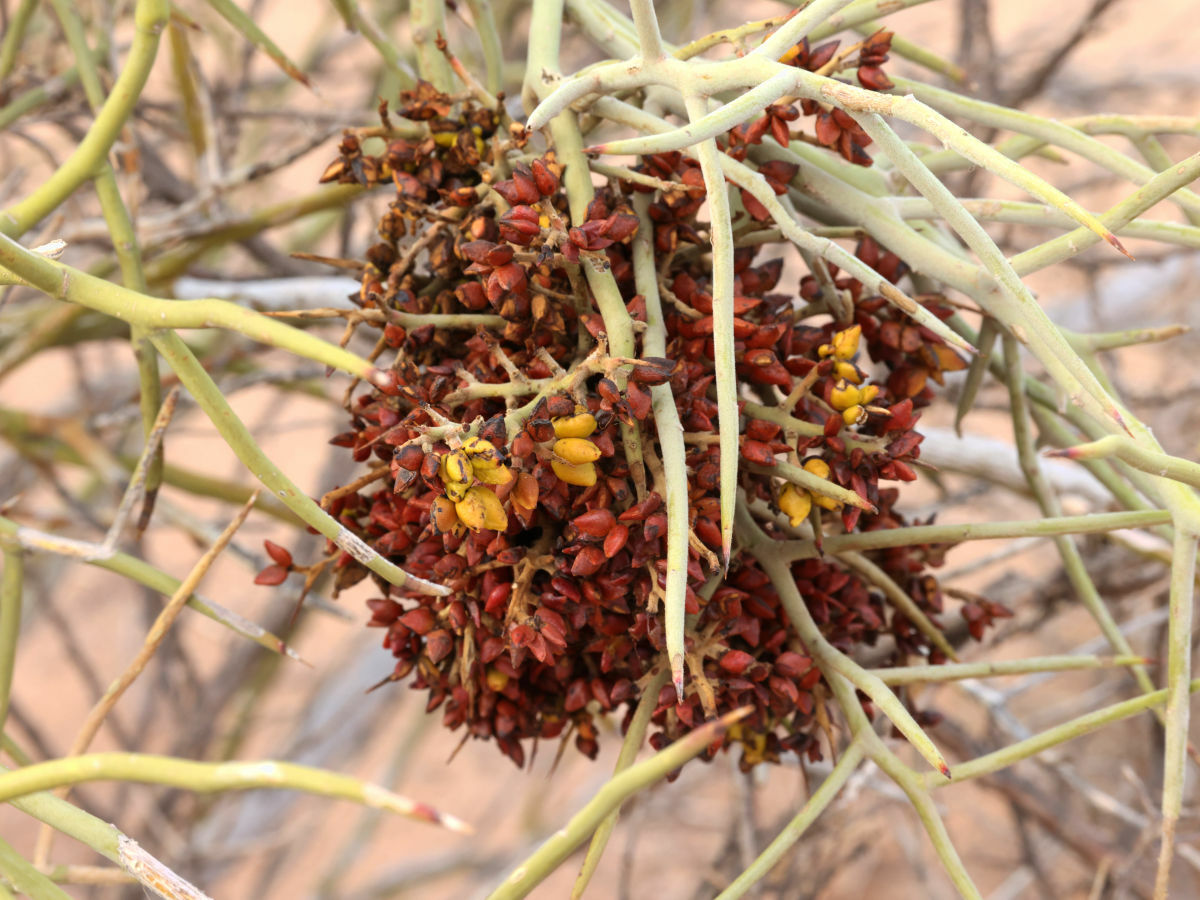
fruit cluster

== Ecology ==
Castela emoryi is one of the few plants in its habitat that blooms in the mid-summer heat, and serves as an important source of resources for insects during that time. Its nectar is collected by ants, and pollination is performed by wasps and bees, particularly bumblebees.

== Uses ==
The Yavapai people traditionally used this as a medicinal plant, making a dermatological aid from its bud's sap.

=== Insecticide and fungicide ===
Castela emoryi is a plant toxin insecticide. It contains quassinoids such as glaucarubolone glucoside which has antifeedant properties against termites such as Reticulitermes flavipes, or potential fungicidal activity for the control of grape downy mildew.

It also contains glaucarubol, a compound characteristic of the family, ellagic acid, betulin and (—)-syringaresinol.
