= Nothospondias =

Conservation status
- Vulnerable (IUCN 2.3)

Scientific classification
- Kingdom: Plantae
- Clade: Tracheophytes
- Clade: Angiosperms
- Clade: Eudicots
- Clade: Rosids
- Order: Sapindales
- Family: Simaroubaceae
- Genus: Nothospondias; Engl.
- Species: N. staudtii

Binomial name
- Nothospondias staudtii Engl.

Synonyms
- Nothospondias talbotii S.Moore

Genus of flowering plants

Nothospondias is a genus of plants in the family Simaroubaceae. It contains the sole species Nothospondias staudtii, native to Cameroon, Côte d'Ivoire, Gabon, Ghana, and Nigeria. It is a dioecious tree.
