= Picrolemma =

Scientific classification
- Kingdom: Plantae
- Clade: Tracheophytes
- Clade: Angiosperms
- Clade: Eudicots
- Clade: Rosids
- Order: Sapindales
- Family: Simaroubaceae
- Genus: Picrolemma; Hook.f.

Genus of plants

Picrolemma is a genus of flowering plants belonging to the family Simaroubaceae. They are small dioecious shrubs.

Its native range is Southern Tropical America.

Species:

- Picrolemma huberi Ducke
- Picrolemma sprucei Benth. & Hook.f.
