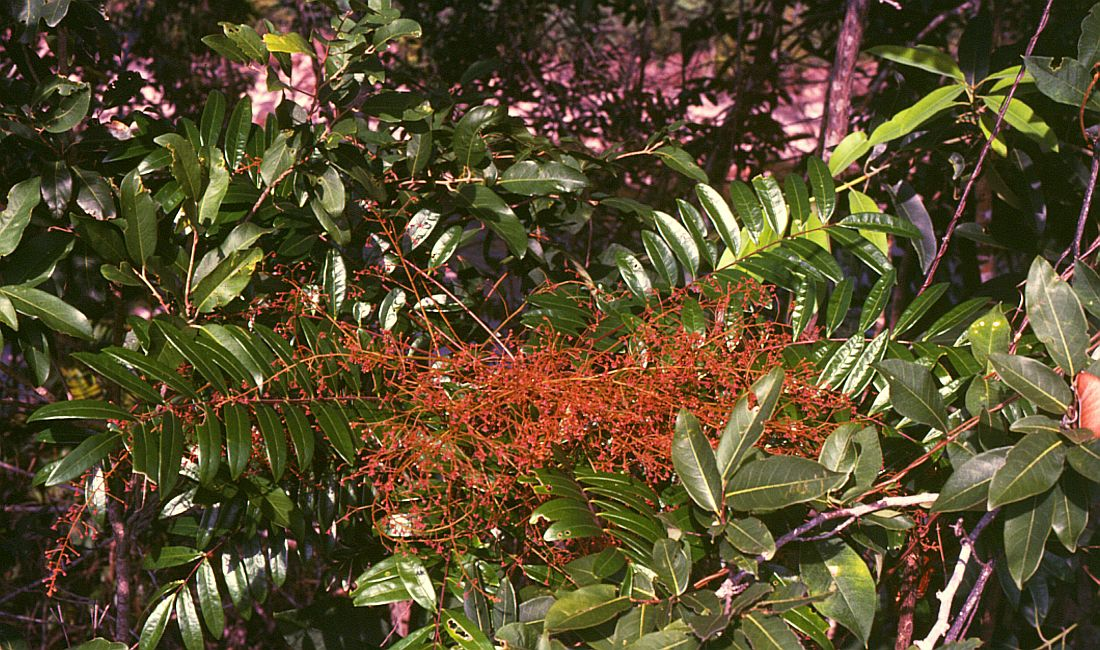
- Eurycoma longifolia, flowering plant

Scientific classification
- Kingdom: Plantae
- Clade: Tracheophytes
- Clade: Angiosperms
- Clade: Eudicots
- Clade: Rosids
- Order: Sapindales
- Family: Simaroubaceae
- Genus: Eurycoma; Jack

Synonyms
- Picroxylon Warb.

= Eurycoma =

Genus of flowering plants

Eurycoma is a small genus of flowering plants in the family Simaroubaceae, native to tropical Southeast Asia. They are small evergreen trees with spirally arranged pinnate leaves. The flowers are small, produced in large panicles.

As of December 2023, Plants of the World Online accepted the following species:

- Eurycoma apiculata Benn.
- Eurycoma harmandiana Pierre
- Eurycoma longifolia Jack
