= Odyendea =

Scientific classification
- Kingdom: Plantae
- Clade: Tracheophytes
- Clade: Angiosperms
- Clade: Eudicots
- Clade: Rosids
- Order: Sapindales
- Family: Simaroubaceae
- Genus: Odyendea; Engl. (1896)

Species
- Odyendea gabunensis (Pierre) Engl.; Odyendea klaineana (Pierre) Engl.

Genus of flowering plants

Odyendea is a genus of flowering plants in the family Simaroubaceae. It includes two species of shrubs or trees native to sub-Saharan Africa.

- Odyendea gabunensis (Pierre) Engl.
- Odyendea klaineana (Pierre) Engl.
