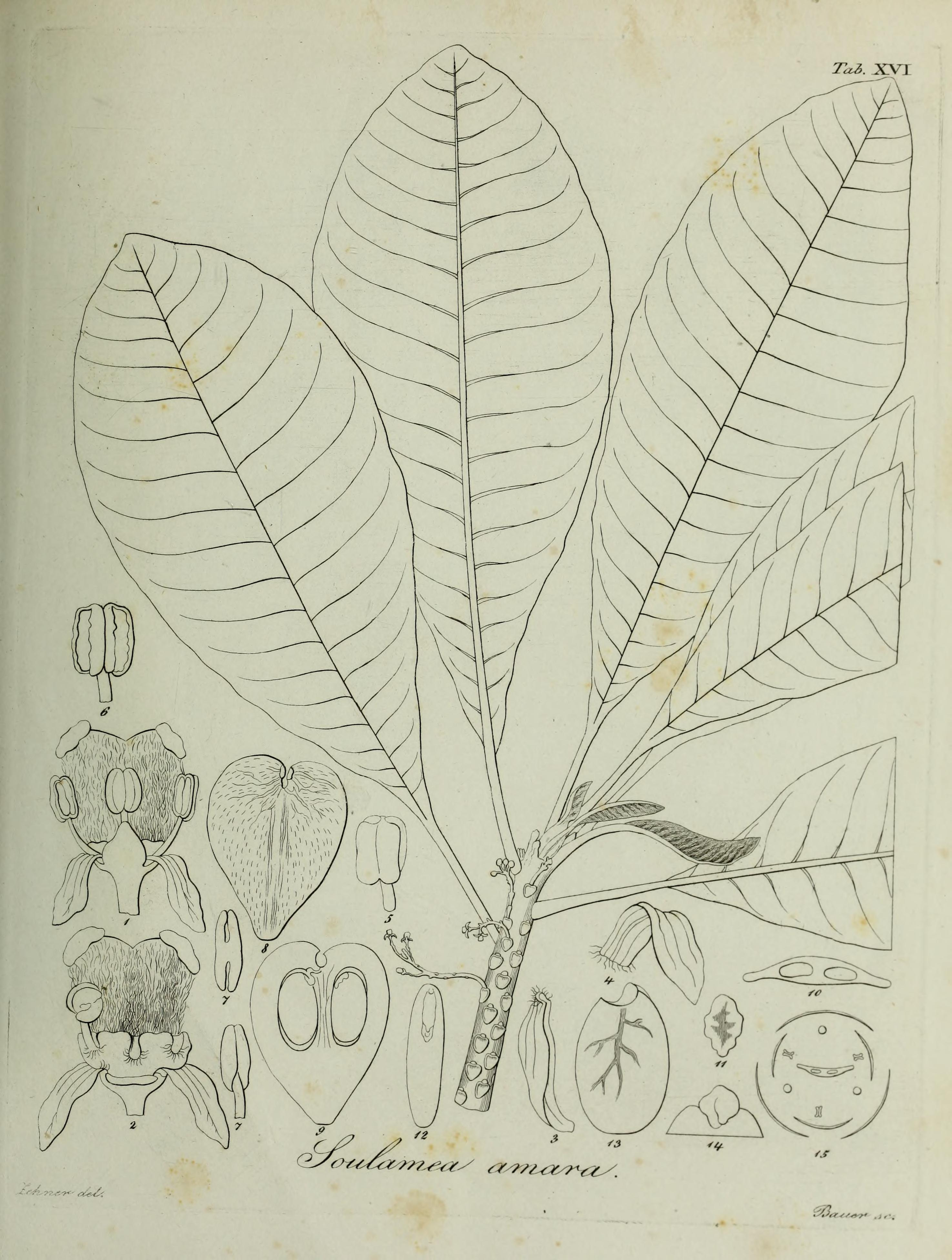
- Soulamea amara

Scientific classification
- Kingdom: Plantae
- Clade: Tracheophytes
- Clade: Angiosperms
- Clade: Eudicots
- Clade: Rosids
- Order: Sapindales
- Family: Simaroubaceae
- Genus: Soulamea; Lam. (1785)

Synonyms
- Amaroria A.Gray (1853); Cardiocarpus Reinw. (1825); Cardiophora Benth. (1843); Picrocardia Radlk. (1890)

= Soulamea =

Genus of plants

Soulamea is a genus of plant in family Simaroubaceae. They are shrubs or small trees, and are dioecious, with the exception of Soulamea amara, which has bisexual flowers. It is native to parts of Malesia in the West Pacific. From the Seychelles, Borneo, Bismarck Archipelago, Caroline Islands, Marshall Islands, New Caledonia, New Guinea and Maluku to the Solomon Islands, Vanuatu, and Fiji.

== Species ==
14 species are accepted.

- Soulamea amara Lam.
- Soulamea cardioptera Baill.
- Soulamea cycloptera Guillaumin
- Soulamea dagostinii Jaffré & Fambart
- Soulamea fraxinifolia Brongn. & Gris
- Soulamea moratii Jaffré & Fambart
- Soulamea muelleri Brongn. & Gris
- Soulamea pancheri Brongn. & Gris
- Soulamea pelletieri Jaffré & Fambart
- Soulamea rigaultii Jaffré & Fambart
- Soulamea soulameoides (A.Gray) Noot. – Fiji
- Soulamea terminalioides Baker – Seychelles
- Soulamea tomentosa Brongn. & Gris
- Soulamea trifoliata Baill.
