= Eurycomanone =

Names
- Other names Pasakbumin-A

Identifiers
CAS Number	84633-29-4
3D model (JSmol)	Interactive image
ChemSpider	24742022Stereo differ
PubChem CID	3069398
UNII	X7F43HL2HB
CompTox Dashboard (EPA)	DTXSID101004921
- InChI: InChI=1S/C20H24O9/c1-7-4-10(21)13(23)17(3)9(7)5-11-18-6-28-20(27,16(17)18)12(22)8(2)19(18,26)14(24)15(25)29-11/h4,9,11-14,16,22-24,26-27H,2,5-6H2,1,3H3/t9-,11+,12+,13+,14-,16+,17+,18?,19-,20+/m0/s1 Key: UCUWZJWAQQRCOR-HVKQXNTCSA-N
- SMILES: CC1=CC(=O)[C@H]([C@]2([C@H]1C[C@@H]3C45[C@@H]2[C@@]([C@@H](C(=C)[C@@]4([C@H](C(=O)O3)O)O)O)(OC5)O)C)O

Properties
Chemical formula	C_{20}H_{24}O_{9}
Molar mass	408.403 g·mol^{−1}
- Except where otherwise noted, data are given for materials in their standard state (at 25 °C [77 °F], 100 kPa). Infobox references

Eurycomanone is a chemical compound that has been isolated from Eurycoma longifolia, also known as the longjack plant or tongkat ali. Eurycomanone is distributed throughout the plant, with the highest concentration in leaves. Researchers measured 6.0568 μg/mL in leaves, and only 0.3533 μg/mL in roots.

== Mechanism of action ==
Eurycomanone is thought to be central to the sex-hormone increasing effects of Eurycoma longifolia supplementation. In vitro, eurycomanone has been shown to enhance testosterone steroidogenesis through its inhibitory effects on aromatase, presumably causing testosterone production to increase to restore downstream estrogen homeostasis.

As of November 2022, there are no studies investigating the effects of isolated Eurycomanone in human subjects. However, studies investigating the effects supplementation with Eurycoma longifolia in human subjects have observed increases in free and total testosterone, with some studies showing increases or no changes in estradiol, luteinizing hormone, sex binding hormone globulin and follicle-stimulating hormone in both healthy and hypogonadism-affected men.
