= Allantospermum =

Scientific classification
- Kingdom: Plantae
- Clade: Tracheophytes
- Clade: Angiosperms
- Clade: Eudicots
- Clade: Rosids
- Order: Malpighiales
- Family: Irvingiaceae
- Genus: Allantospermum; Forman

Species
- See text

Synonyms
- Cleistanthopsis Capuron

Genus of flowering plants

Allantospermum is a genus of trees up to 90 m (300 ft) tall in the family Irvingiaceae. Formerly it has been included in families Simaroubaceae and Ixonanthaceae. It contains the following two species:

- Allantospermum borneense Forman – Malesia
- Allantospermum multicaule (Capuron) Noot. – Madagascar
