= Homalolepis =

Scientific classification
- Kingdom: Plantae
- Clade: Embryophytes
- Clade: Tracheophytes
- Clade: Spermatophytes
- Clade: Angiosperms
- Clade: Eudicots
- Clade: Rosids
- Order: Sapindales
- Family: Simaroubaceae
- Genus: Homalolepis; Turcz.

Genus of plants

Homalolepis is a genus of flowering plants belonging to the family Simaroubaceae.

Its native range is Costa Rica to South Tropical America.

Species:

- Homalolepis arenaria (Devecchi & Pirani) Devecchi & Pirani
- Homalolepis bahiensis (Moric.) Devecchi & Pirani
- Homalolepis cavalcantei (W.W.Thomas) Devecchi & Pirani
- Homalolepis cedron (Planch.) Devecchi & Pirani
- Homalolepis cuneata (A.St.-Hil. & Tul.) Devecchi & Pirani
- Homalolepis docensis (Franceschin. & K.Yamam.) Devecchi & Pirani
- Homalolepis ferruginea (A.St.-Hil.) Devecchi & Pirani
- Homalolepis floribunda (A.St.-Hil.) Devecchi & Pirani
- Homalolepis glabra (Engl.) Devecchi & Pirani
- Homalolepis guajirensis Devecchi, W.W.Thomas & Pirani
- Homalolepis insignis (A.St.-Hil. & Tul.) Devecchi & Pirani
- Homalolepis intermedia (Mansf.) Devecchi & Pirani
- Homalolepis maiana (Casar.) Devecchi & Pirani
- Homalolepis morettii (Feuillet) Devecchi & Pirani
- Homalolepis paraensis (Ducke) Devecchi & Pirani
- Homalolepis planaltina Devecchi & Pirani
- Homalolepis pohliana (F.Boas) Devecchi & Pirani
- Homalolepis praecox (Hassl.) Devecchi & Pirani
- Homalolepis pumila Devecchi & Pirani
- Homalolepis rigida Devecchi
- Homalolepis rotundata Devecchi, Pirani & W.W.Thomas
- Homalolepis salubris (Engl.) Devecchi & Pirani
- Homalolepis suaveolens (A.St.-Hil.) Devecchi & Pirani
- Homalolepis subcymosa (A.St.-Hil. & Tul.) Devecchi & Pirani
- Homalolepis suffruticosa (Engl.) Devecchi & Pirani
- Homalolepis tocantina (Devecchi & Pirani) Devecchi & Pirani
- Homalolepis trichilioides (A.St.-Hil.) Devecchi & Pirani
- Homalolepis warmingiana (Engl.) Devecchi & Pirani
