= Gymnostemon =

Conservation status
- Vulnerable (IUCN 2.3)

Scientific classification
- Kingdom: Plantae
- Clade: Tracheophytes
- Clade: Angiosperms
- Clade: Eudicots
- Clade: Rosids
- Order: Sapindales
- Family: Simaroubaceae
- Genus: Gymnostemon; Aubrév. & Pellegr.
- Species: G. zaizou

Binomial name
- Gymnostemon zaizou Aubrév. & Pellegr.

Genus of trees

Gymnostemon is a monotypic genus of plants in the family Simaroubaceae. The sole species, Gymnostemon zaizou, is semi-deciduous forest tree. It is endemic to Côte d'Ivoire and threatened by habitat loss throughout its native range of the Sassandra River Basin. G. zaizou is a commercial hardwood species that is well-adapted to the heavy rainfall of western Africa. Wood from this species of tree is also used locally to make barred percussion instruments.
