= René Richard Louis Castel =

French poet and naturalist

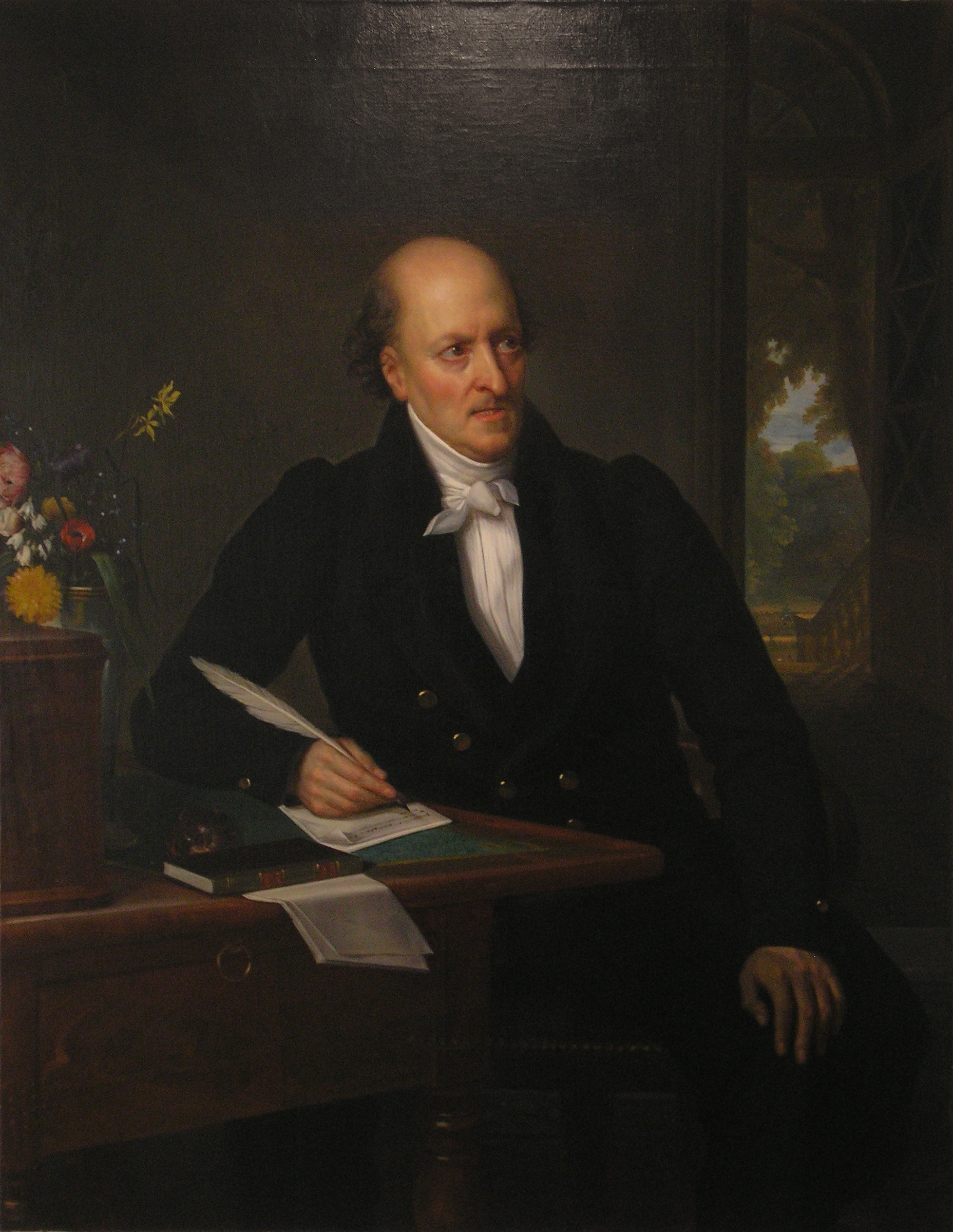
- Louis Germain, Portrait of René Castel, 1832 (Vire, musée de Vire)
- Born: 6 October 1758
- Died: 15 June 1832 (aged 73)
- Occupations: poet and naturalist

René Richard Louis Castel (6 October 1758 in Vire – 15 June 1832 in Reims) was a French poet and naturalist.

The genus Castela was named after him, honoring his works in botany.

== Associated works ==
- Les Plantes, poëme, Paris, Migneret, 1797.
- Histoire naturelle des poissons : avec les figures dessinées d'après nature / par Bloch; ouvrage classé par ordres, genres et espèces, d'après le systeme de Linné; avec les caractères génériques par René-Richard Castel, with Marcus Elieser Bloch, part of series: "Histoire naturelle de Buffon"; t. 32–41.
- La Forêt de Fontainebleau, poëme, Paris : Deterville, an XIII-1805.
- Le prince de Catane opéra en trois actes. Paroles de M. Castel, 1813 by Nicolo Isouard, words by René Castel. (an opera after Voltaires L'Education d'un prince).
