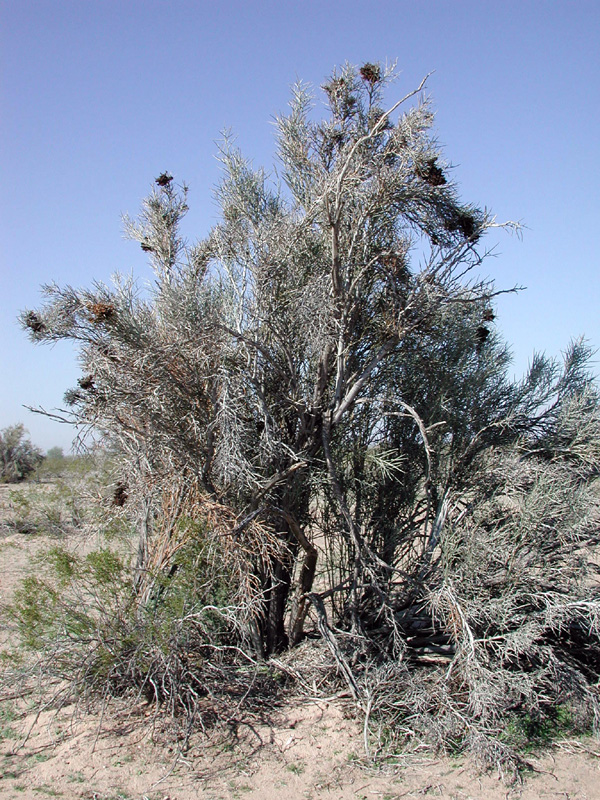
- Castela emoryi

Scientific classification
- Kingdom: Plantae
- Clade: Tracheophytes
- Clade: Angiosperms
- Clade: Eudicots
- Clade: Rosids
- Order: Sapindales
- Family: Simaroubaceae
- Genus: Castela; Turp.

Species
- 17 - See text

Synonyms
- Holacantha A.Gray; Neocastela Small

= Castela =

Genus of plants

Castela is a genus of thorny shrubs and small trees in the family Simaroubaceae. Members of the genus are native to the Americas, especially the tropical regions. The generic name honours the French naturalist René Richard Louis Castel. Castela is dioecious, with male and female flowers on separate plants.

== Species ==
There are 17 accepted species:

- Castela calcicola (Britton & Small) Ekman ex Urb.
- Castela coccinea Griseb.
- Castela depressa Turpin
- Castela emoryi (A.Gray) Moran & Felger – Crucifixion thorn
- Castela erecta Turp. – Goatbush
- Castela galapageia – Bitterbush
- Castela jacquiniifolia (Small) Ekman ex Urb.
- Castela leonis Acuña & Roíg
- Castela macrophylla Urb.
- Castela peninsularis Rose
- Castela polyandra Moran & Felger
- Castela retusa Liebm.
- Castela spinosa Cronquist
- Castela stewartii (C.H.Müll.) Moran & Felger
- Castela tortuosa Liebm.
- Castela tweediei Planch.
- Castela victorinii Acuña & Roíg
