= Iridosma =

Scientific classification
- Kingdom: Plantae
- Clade: Tracheophytes
- Clade: Angiosperms
- Clade: Eudicots
- Clade: Rosids
- Order: Sapindales
- Family: Simaroubaceae
- Genus: Iridosma; Aubrév. & Pellegr.
- Species: I. letestui

Binomial name
- Iridosma letestui (Pellegr.) Aubrév. & Pellegr.

Genus of plants

Iridosma is a monotypic genus of flowering plants belonging to the family Simaroubaceae. The only species is Iridosma letestui.

Its native range is Gabon.
