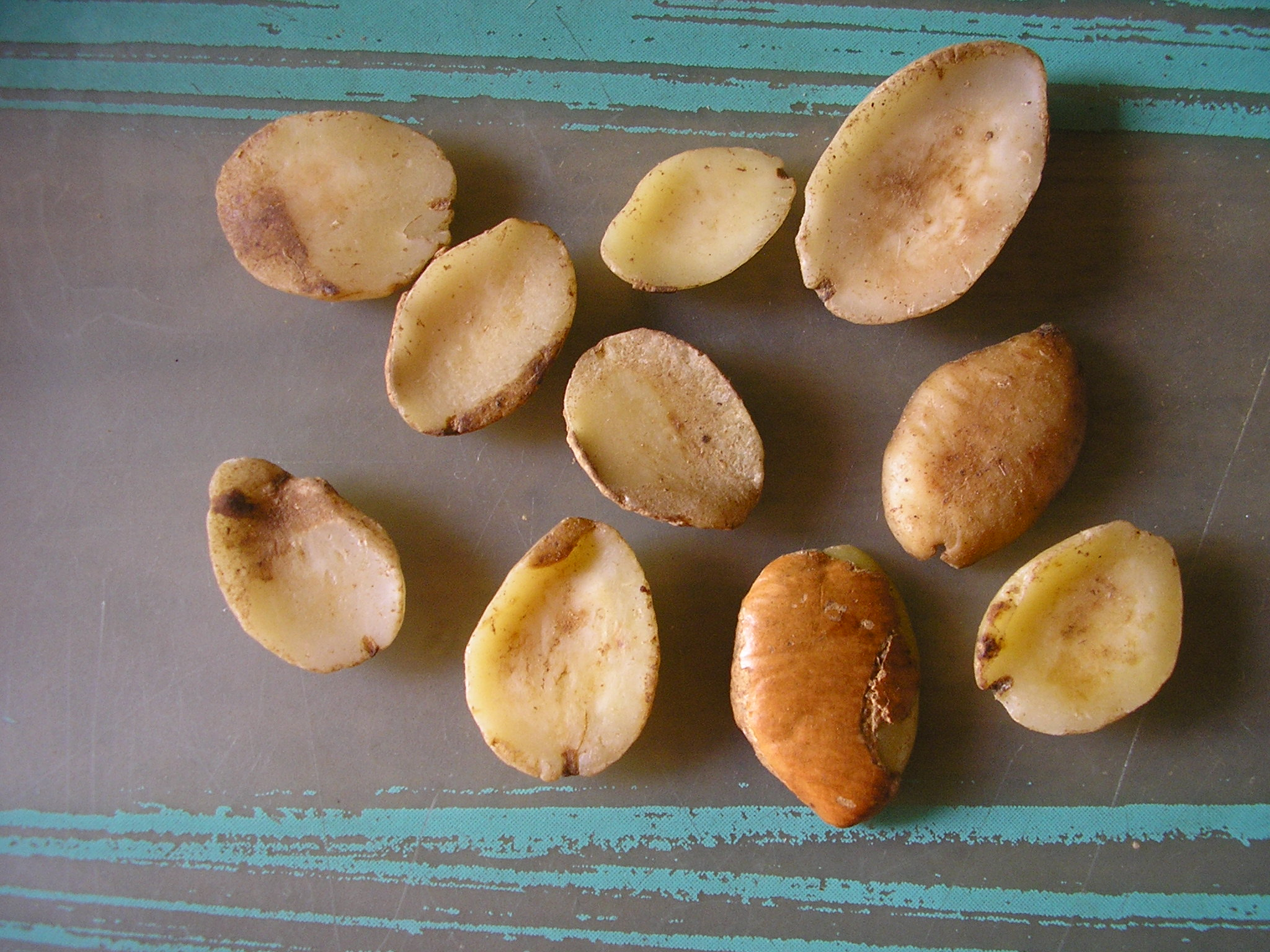
- Ogbono nuts

Scientific classification
- Kingdom: Plantae
- Clade: Tracheophytes
- Clade: Angiosperms
- Clade: Eudicots
- Clade: Rosids
- Order: Malpighiales
- Family: Irvingiaceae
- Genus: Irvingia; Hook.f. 1860 not F. Muell. 1865 (syn of Polyscias in Araliaceae)

Type species
- Irvingia smithii Hook.f.

Synonyms
- Irvingella Tiegh.

= Irvingia =

Genus of trees

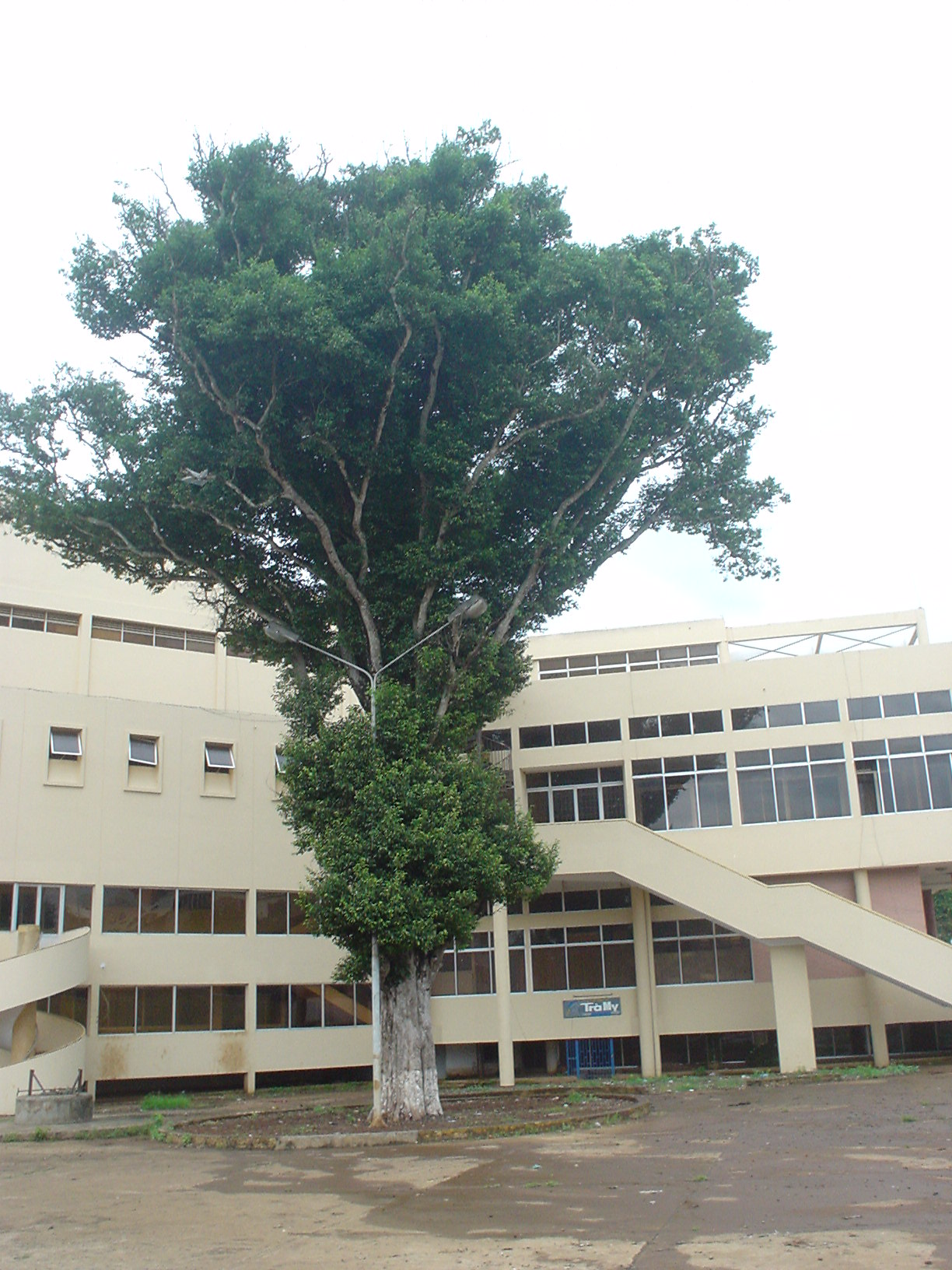
Irvingia malayana in Buon Ma Thuot, Dak Lak, Vietnam

Irvingia is a genus of African and Southeast Asian trees in the family Irvingiaceae, sometimes known by the common names wild mango, African mango, bush mango, dika, mbukpap uyo or ogbono.

They bear edible mango-like fruits (large drupes, with fibrous flesh), and are especially valued for their fat- and protein-rich nuts.

== Taxonomy ==
Irvingia was described as a genus in 1860. The genus is named in honour of Edward George Irving, a Royal Navy surgeon.

List of species:

Image	Scientific name	Distribution
	Irvingia excelsa	C Africa
	Irvingia gabonensis	W + C Africa
	Irvingia grandifolia	C Africa
	Irvingia malayana	SE Asia
	Irvingia robur	W + C Africa
	Irvingia smithii	W + C Africa
	Irvingia tenuinucleata	W + C Africa

== Distribution ==
It is native to Africa and Southeast Asia.

== Uses ==
The subtly aromatic nuts are typically dried in the sun for preservation, and are sold whole or in powder form. They may be ground to a paste known variously as dika bread or Gabon chocolate. Their high content of mucilage enables them to be used as thickening agents for dishes such as ogbono soup. The nuts may also be pressed for vegetable oil.

The trees yield a hard wood, useful in construction.
