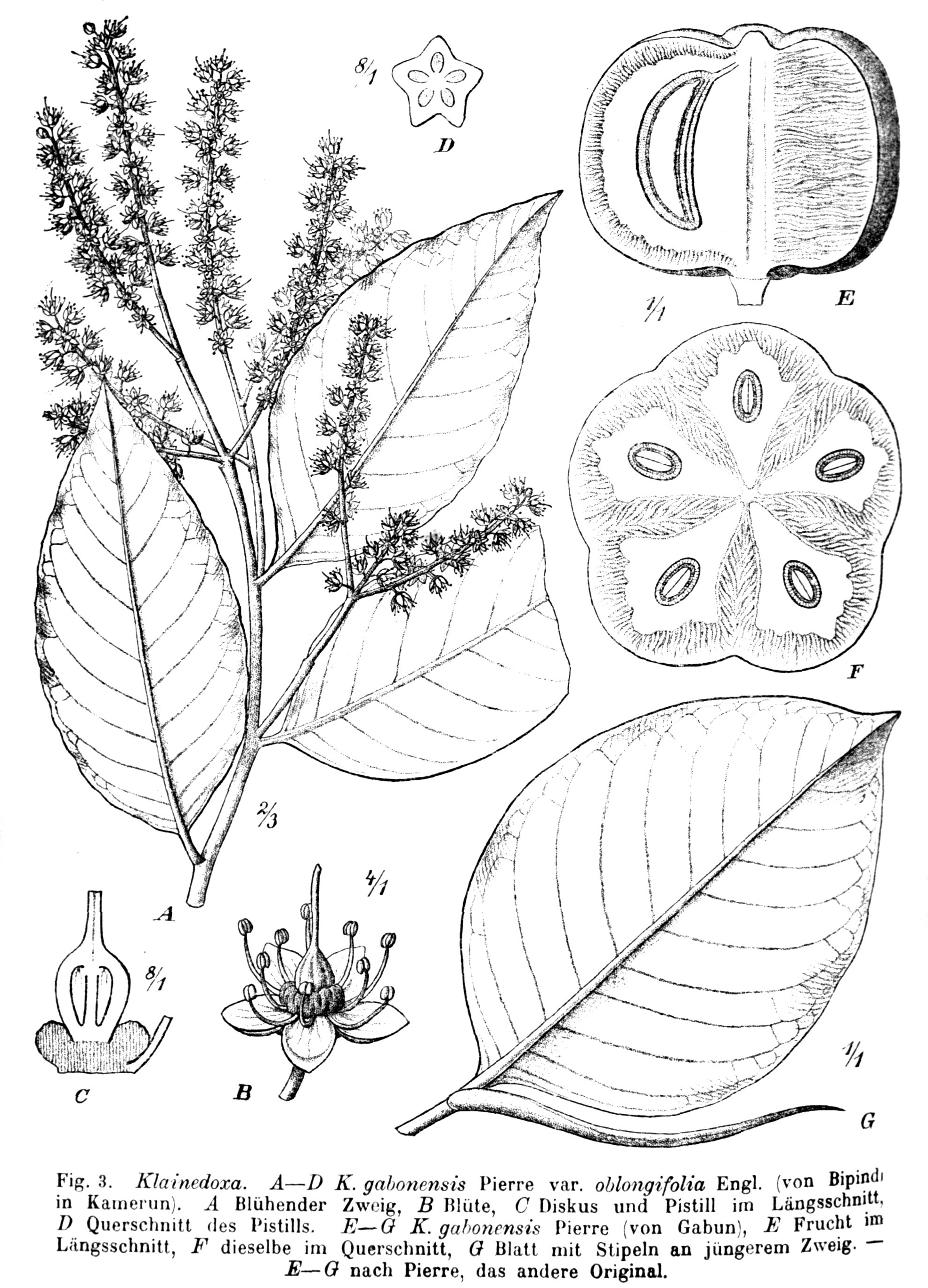

Scientific classification
- Kingdom: Plantae
- Clade: Tracheophytes
- Clade: Angiosperms
- Clade: Eudicots
- Clade: Rosids
- Order: Malpighiales
- Family: Irvingiaceae
- Genus: Klainedoxa; Pierre ex Engl.

Synonyms
- Condgiea Baill. ex Tiegh., not validly published

= Klainedoxa =

Genus of trees

Klainedoxa is a group of African trees in the family Irvingiaceae, described as a genus in 1896. It is native to Africa.

Species

- Klainedoxa gabonensis Pierre - W + C Africa from Senegal to South Sudan + Tanzania south to Angola
- Klainedoxa trillesii Pierre ex Tiegh. - from Ivory Coast to The Democratic Republic of the Congo
