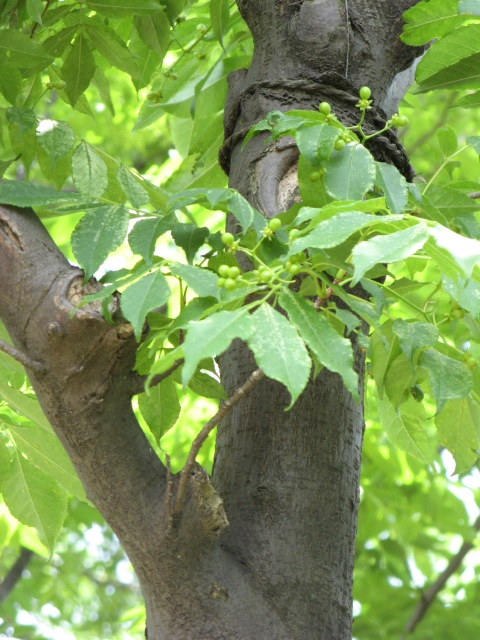
- Picrasma quassioides

Scientific classification
- Kingdom: Plantae
- Clade: Tracheophytes
- Clade: Angiosperms
- Clade: Eudicots
- Clade: Rosids
- Order: Sapindales
- Family: Simaroubaceae
- Genus: Picrasma; Blume

= Picrasma =

Genus of flowering plants

Picrasma is a genus of flowering plants in the family Simaroubaceae, comprising six to nine species native to temperate to tropical regions of Asia, and tropical regions of the Americas. The species are shrubs and trees growing up to 20 m tall.

== Selected species ==
- Picrasma chinensis P.Y.Chen
- Picrasma crenata Engl. in Engl. & Prantl
- Picrasma excelsa (Sw.) Planch.
- Picrasma javanica Blume
- Picrasma mexicana Brandegee
- Picrasma quassioides (D.Don) Benn.
