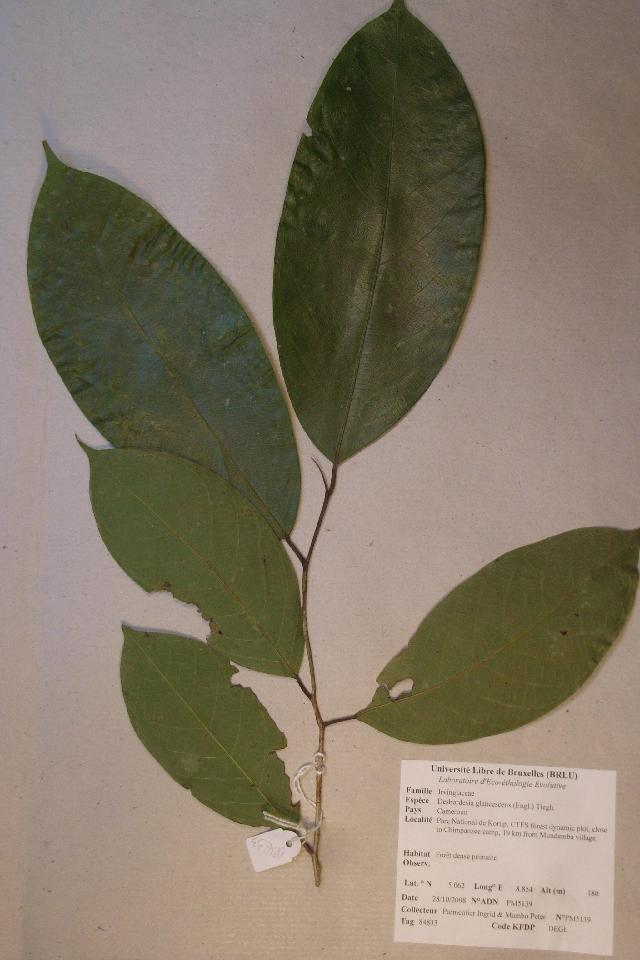
- Desbordesia glaucescens specimen from Korup National Park, Cameroon

Conservation status
- Least Concern (IUCN 3.1)

Scientific classification
- Kingdom: Plantae
- Clade: Tracheophytes
- Clade: Angiosperms
- Clade: Eudicots
- Clade: Rosids
- Order: Malpighiales
- Family: Irvingiaceae
- Genus: Desbordesia; Pierre & Tiegh 1905, conserved name, not Pierre 1901 nor (Engl.) Tiegh. 1905
- Species: D. glaucescens

Binomial name
- Desbordesia glaucescens (Engl.) Tiegh.

Synonyms
- Irvingia glaucescens Engl.; Desbordesia insignis Pierre ex Tiegh.; Desbordesia pallida Tiegh.; Desbordesia pierreana Tiegh.; Desbordesia soyauxii Tiegh.; Desbordesia spirei Tiegh.; Irvingella spirei Tiegh.; Irvingia oblonga A.Chev.; Desbordesia oblonga (A.Chev.) Heitz

= Desbordesia =

Genus of flowering plants

Desbordesia is a group of African trees in the family Irvingiaceae, described as a genus in 1905. There is only one known species, Desbordesia glaucescens, native to central Africa (Nigeria, Cameroon, Gabon, Equatorial Guinea, the Republic of the Congo and the Democratic Republic of the Congo).
