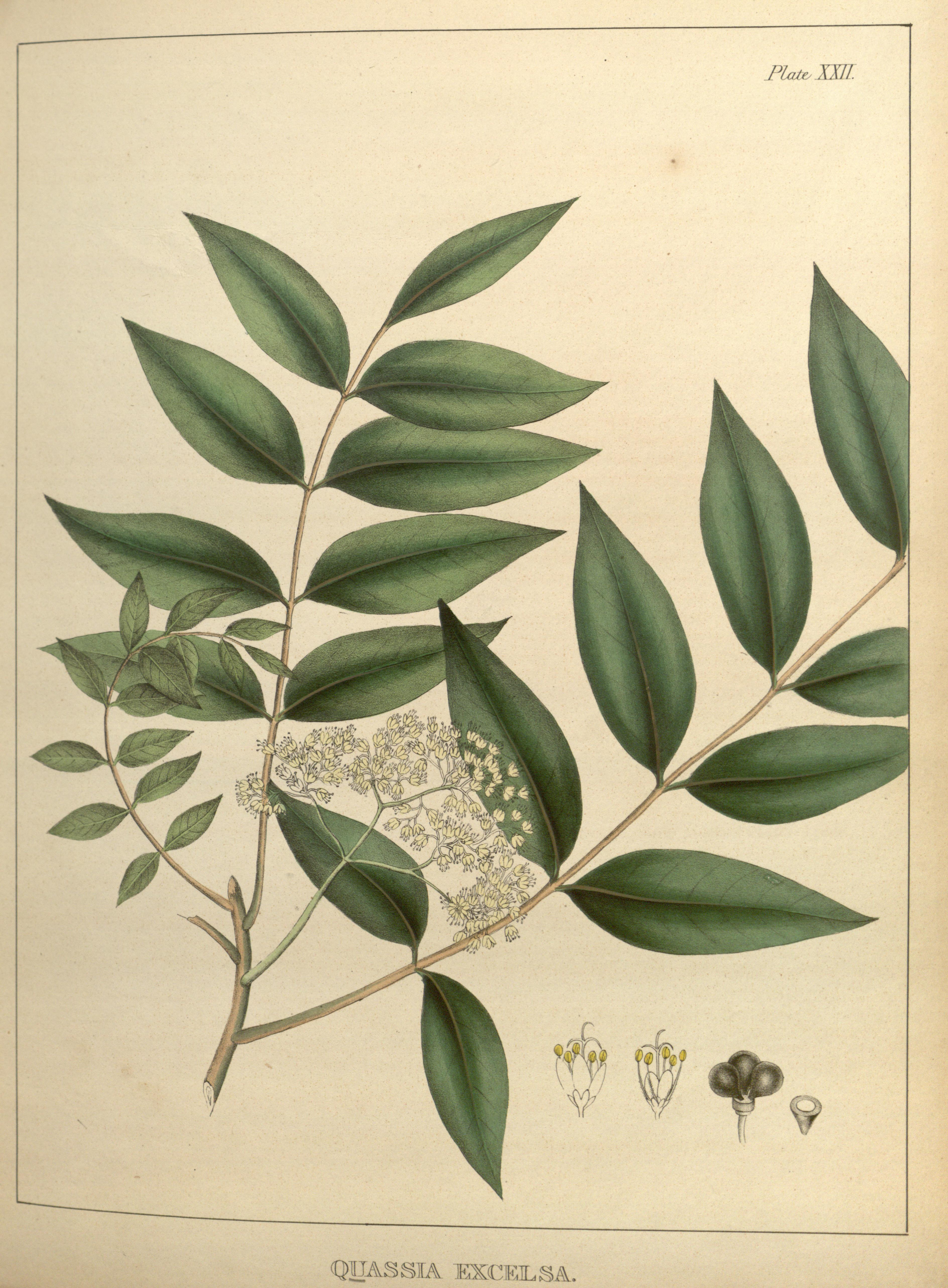

Conservation status
- Vulnerable (IUCN 2.3)

Scientific classification
- Kingdom: Plantae
- Clade: Tracheophytes
- Clade: Angiosperms
- Clade: Eudicots
- Clade: Rosids
- Order: Sapindales
- Family: Simaroubaceae
- Genus: Picrasma
- Species: P. excelsa

Binomial name
- Picrasma excelsa (Sw.) Planch.

Synonyms
- Aeschrion antillana (Eggers) Small; Aeschrion excelsa (Sw.) Kuntze; Aeschrion excelsa var. microcarpa Krug & Urb. Muenteria excelsa (Sw.) Walp. Picraena excelsa (Sw.) Lindl. Picrasma antillana (Eggers) Urb. Quassia excelsa Sw. Quassia pentandra Stokes; Quassia polygama Linds. Rhus antillana Eggers; Simarouba excelsa (Sw.) DC.

= Picrasma excelsa =

Species of flowering plant

Picrasma excelsa is a species of Picrasma in the family Simaroubaceae. It is found in Cuba, the Dominican Republic, Haiti, Jamaica, Puerto Rico, Saint Vincent and the Grenadines, and Venezuela. It is threatened by habitat loss.
