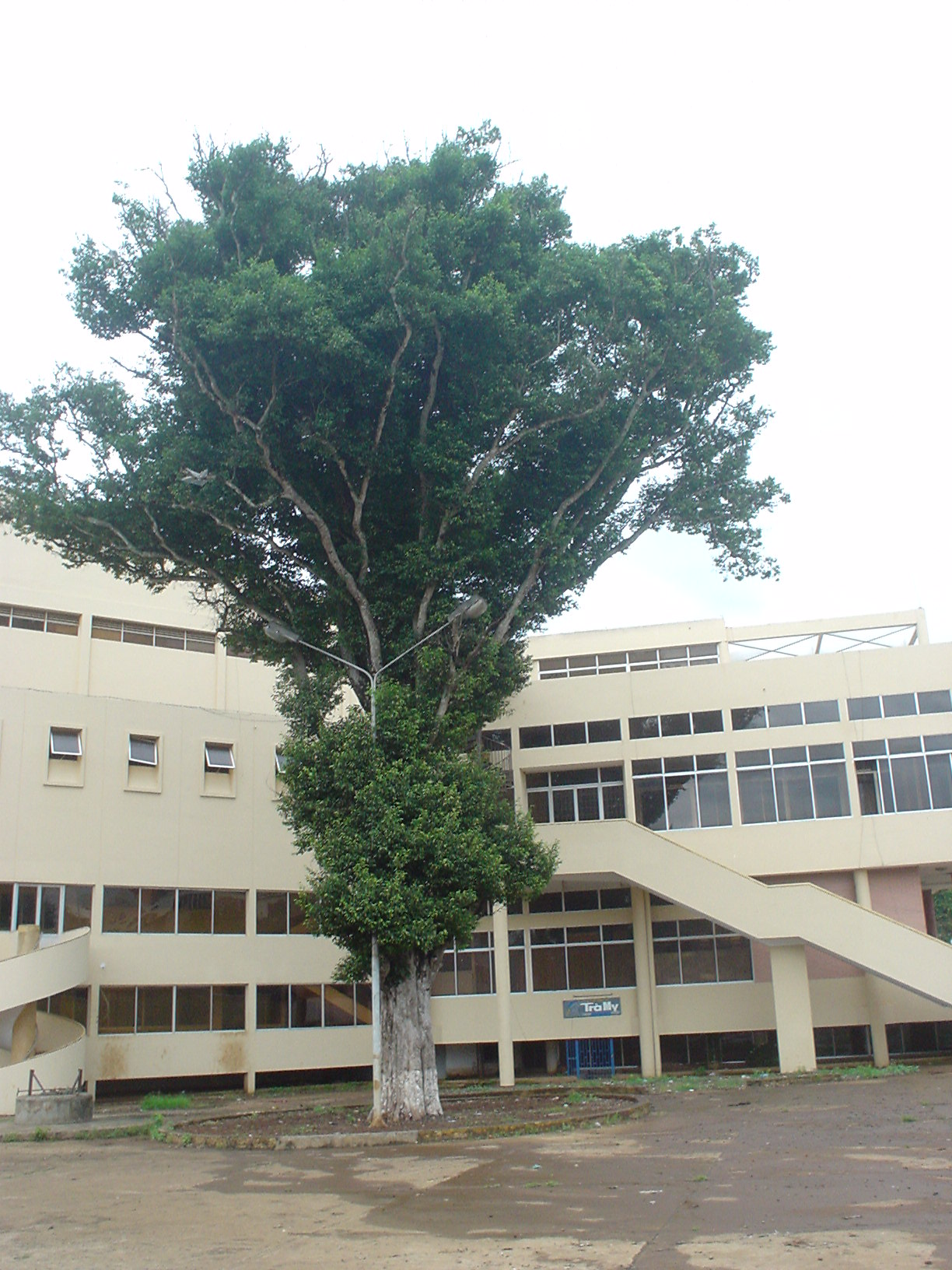
- Irvingia malayana

Scientific classification
- Kingdom: Plantae
- Clade: Tracheophytes
- Clade: Angiosperms
- Clade: Eudicots
- Clade: Rosids
- Order: Malpighiales
- Family: Irvingiaceae; Exell & Mendonça

= Irvingiaceae =

Family of flowering plants

Irvingiaceae is a small family of flowering plants, consisting of about 13 species; it was erected by Exell and Mendonça in 1951.

The family and type genus were named after the Scottish naval surgeon, Edward George Irving.

== Genera ==
Plants of the World Online includes:

- Allantospermum Forman
- Desbordesia Pierre ex Tiegh.
- Irvingia Hook.f.
- Klainedoxa Pierre ex Engl.
