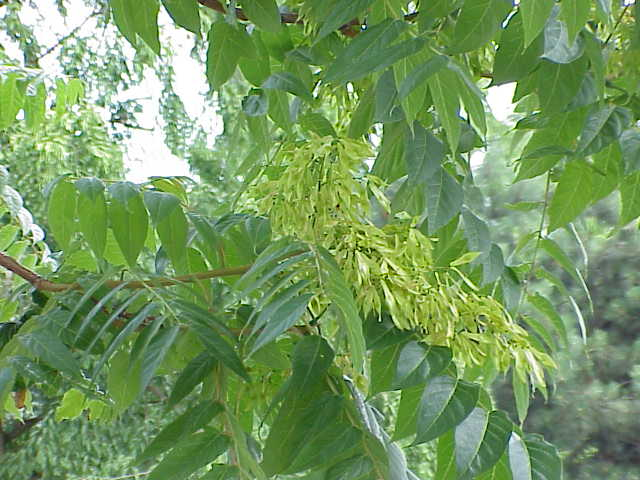
- Ailanthus altissima

Scientific classification
- Kingdom: Plantae
- Clade: Tracheophytes
- Clade: Angiosperms
- Clade: Eudicots
- Clade: Rosids
- Order: Sapindales
- Family: Simaroubaceae; DC.

Genera
- See text
- Distribution of the family Simaroubaceae.

Synonyms
- Ailanthaceae J.Agardh; Castelaceae J.Agardh; Holacanthaceae Jadin, nom. inval.; Leitneriaceae Benth. & Hook.f., nom. cons.; Simabaceae Horan.; Soulameaceae Endl.

= Simaroubaceae =

Family of plants

The Simaroubaceae, also known as the quassia family, are a small, mostly tropical, family in the order Sapindales. In recent decades, it has been subject to much taxonomic debate, with several small families being split off. A molecular phylogeny of the family was published in 2007, greatly clarifying relationships within the family. Together with chemical characteristics such as the occurrence of petroselinic acid in Picrasma, in contrast to other members of the family such as Ailanthus, this indicates the existence of a subgroup in the family with Picrasma, Holacantha, and Castela.

The best-known species is the temperate Chinese tree-of-heaven Ailanthus altissima, which has become a cosmopolitan weed tree of urban areas and wildlands.

Well-known genera in the family include the tropical Quassia and Simarouba.

It is known in English by the common names of the quassia family or ailanthus family.

== Genera ==
21 genera are accepted:

- Ailanthus Desf.
- †Ailanthophyllum Dawson
- Brucea J.F.Mill.
- Castela Turpin
- Eurycoma Jack
- Gymnostemon Aubrév. & Pellegr.
- Hannoa Planch.
- Homalolepis Turcz.
- Iridosma Aubrév. & Pellegr.
- Leitneria Chapm.
- Nothospondias Engl.
- Odyendea Pierre ex Engl.
- Perriera Courchet
- Picrasma Blume
- Picrolemma Hook.f.
- Pierreodendron Engl.
- Quassia L.
- Samadera Gaertn.
- Simaba Aubl.
- Simarouba Aubl.
- Soulamea Lam.

=== Excluded genera ===
- Allantospermum Forman → Irvingiaceae
- Alvaradoa Liebm. → Picramniaceae
- Desbordesia Pierre ex Tiegh. → Irvingiaceae
- Harrisonia R.Br. ex A.Juss. → Rutaceae
- Irvingia Hook.f. → Irvingiaceae
- Kirkia Oliv. → Kirkiaceae
- Klainedoxa Pierre ex Engl. → Irvingiaceae
- Picramnia Sw. → Picramniaceae
- Recchia Sessé & Moc. ex DC. → Surianaceae
