= Birch leafminer =

Name for a group of sawflies

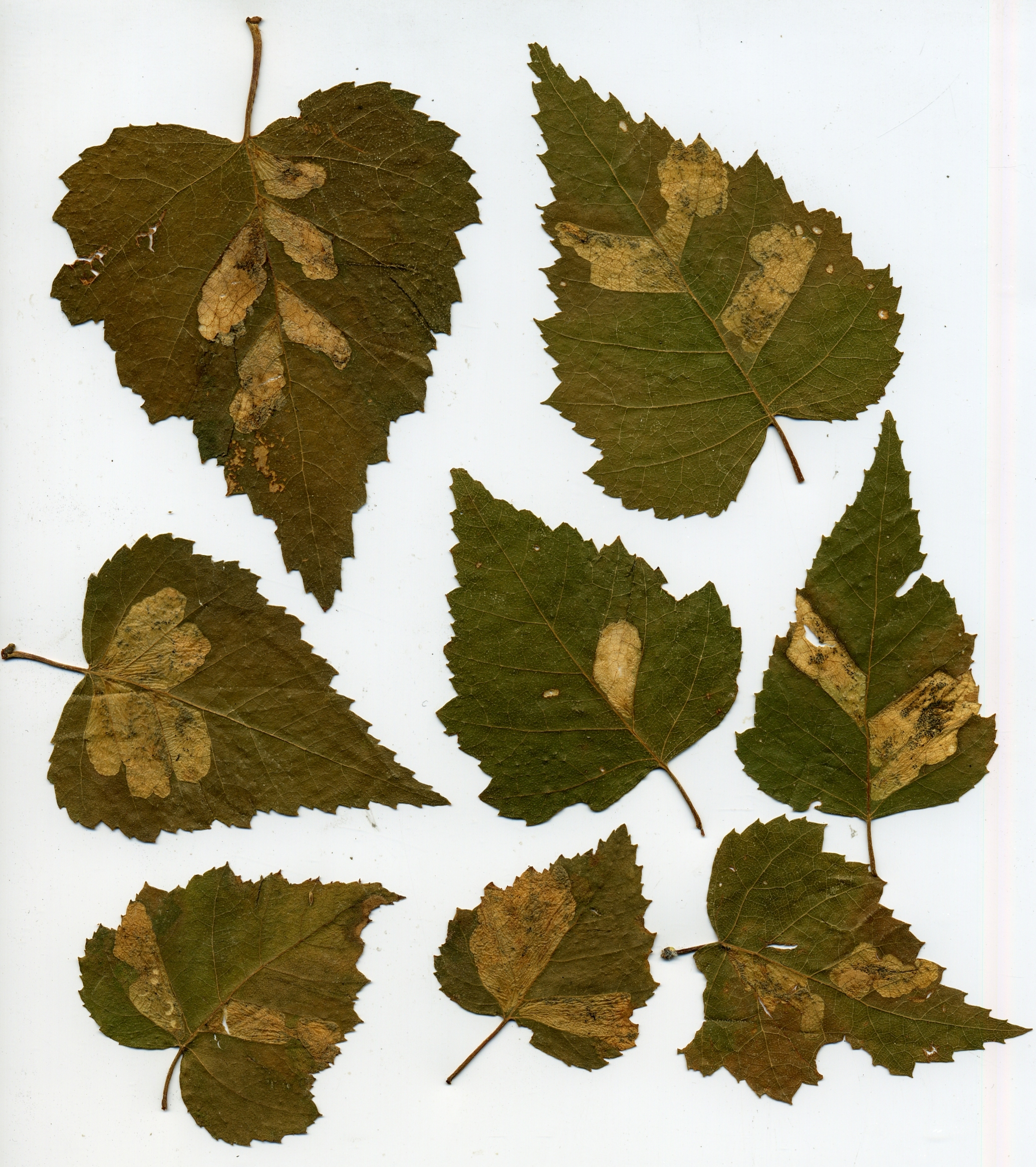
Effect of leafminers in birch leaves

Birch leafminers are sawflies, which are closely related to bees and wasps. They are among the most common insect pests affecting birch trees (Betula spp.) in North America. The primary species affecting birch trees in North America are Profenusa thomsoni and Fenusa pumila. Areas inside the leaves are consumed by the larvae, affecting the leaves' ability to produce food. Yearly browning of birch leaves are noticed in mid July and August, but the leafminers have been feeding inside the leaf tissue since early spring.

== Life cycle ==
Leafminers overwinter in the soil as prepupae. Adults emerge in May to late June to early July, depending on temperature and humidity. Oviposition (egg-laying) peaks during the last week of June. Adult birch leafminers are small (about 1/8 to 1/4 inch long), black and fly like. Females deposit their eggs singly in slits cut in the central areas of young leaves, usually near the tips of branches. More than one female may lay eggs in a leaf.

The eggs hatch into legless, worm-like larvae. These immature larvae feed individually between the leaf surfaces, creating blotchy kidney shaped mines. The immature leafminers feed for several weeks, then drop to the ground where they enter the soil layer to develop into pupae. They pupate and remain there until the following spring. After overwintering as prepupae in the soil below the tree, the adults emerge just as the birch trees are leafed out. Adults are almost all females.

== Damage ==
The areas of leaves that are consumed by the amber marked birch leafminer larva turn brown. Because people often do not see the early signs of birch leafminer feeding, it often appears the tree has suddenly dried up or become diseased. This browning is caused by the outer layers of the leaf drying out after the leaf miner larva has consumed the green tissue between the outer layers of the leaf. Early mines appear as light green or whitish discolorations on the leaves. Larvae sometimes can be seen easily when leaves are held up to sunlight, especially as the mines and larvae grow larger. Feeding over several weeks causes the blemish to take on a blister-like appearance. A single leaf can contain as many as 40 larvae whose mines may merge to destroy the total photosynthetic area of the leaf. Heavy infestations of leafminer larvae can seriously affect a tree's photosynthetic capacity. Repeated attacks will generally cause stress which may induce susceptibility of the tree to other injurious agents.

== Species responsible ==
There are two species mainly responsible for defoliation and browning of birch trees in the United States and Canada. In Northern forests, it is the amber-marked birch leaf miner, Profenusa thomsoni, which were accidentally introduced from Europe to North America early in the 1900s. The other is the birch leafminer, Fenusa pumila, which is more common in Eastern forests.

== Biological control ==
Presently there is no commercially available biological control agent to control Amber marked birch leafminers, however Canadian trees in the Edmonton area have been successfully controlled with releases of a parasitic wasp, Lathrolestes luteolator. Populations of the tiny parasitoid wasp selectively attack the most damaging birch leafmining pest (Profenusa thomsoni) have developed and drastically reduced the problem in the Edmonton area.

Following trials in 1995 that supported a dramatic reduction in birch leafminer damage by the first parasitoid, the City of Edmonton, discontinued pesticide treatments to almost 3,500 city birch trees in 1996 and 1997. These trees continue to show very little leafminer damage without any treatment.

== Chemical control ==
Spinosad can be used to control birch leafminers prior to extensive damage. Spinosad is a new chemical class of insecticides derived from a soil dwelling bacterium discovered in 1982. It is considered practically non-toxic to humans, pets, and beneficial insects. Unlike other insecticides, Spinosad will not harm beneficial insects including the Amber Marked Leafminer parasite.

Horticultural oil applications applied at the right time may help kill eggs or tiny larvae within the leaf tissue. Oil applications should be made as soon as adults have emerged in the spring and egg laying has occurred and should continue weekly until mid June. Pesticides made with botanical plant oils may be especially useful to prevent egg laying. Neem oil acts as a repellent and may interfere with the egg laying activity of female leaf miners.

Systemic insecticides are chemical pesticides that are absorbed into the tissues of plants. These pesticides make the entire plant, or parts of the plant, poisonous to insects that feed on the plant tissue. Most systemics are very toxic to people and pets. Trunk injections are confined to the tree's cambium layer, where it is carried to the leaf tissue by the movement of the tree's sap.

== Sources ==
Natural Resources Forestry Canada, Northern Forestry Centre. Edmonton, Alberta. For. Leafl. 5. Urban Forestry, City of Edmonton, Alberta Canada.

Parkland Services Urban Insect and Disease Report. Ed Holsten, Research Entomologist USDA Forest Service: Alaska Region; S&PF, FHP & PNW, personal communication.

USDA Forest Service, Amber Marked Birch Leafminer Leaflet R10-TP-114 April 2003.
