= Lathrolestes macropygus =

Scientific classification
- Domain: Eukaryota
- Kingdom: Animalia
- Phylum: Arthropoda
- Class: Insecta
- Order: Hymenoptera
- Family: Ichneumonidae
- Genus: Lathrolestes
- Species: L. macropygus

Binomial name
- Lathrolestes macropygus (Holmgren, 1857)

Species of wasp

Lathrolestes macropygus is a species of insect belonging to the family Ichneumonidae.

It is native to Northern Europe. Its hosts include Fenusa dohrnii and F. pusilla.
