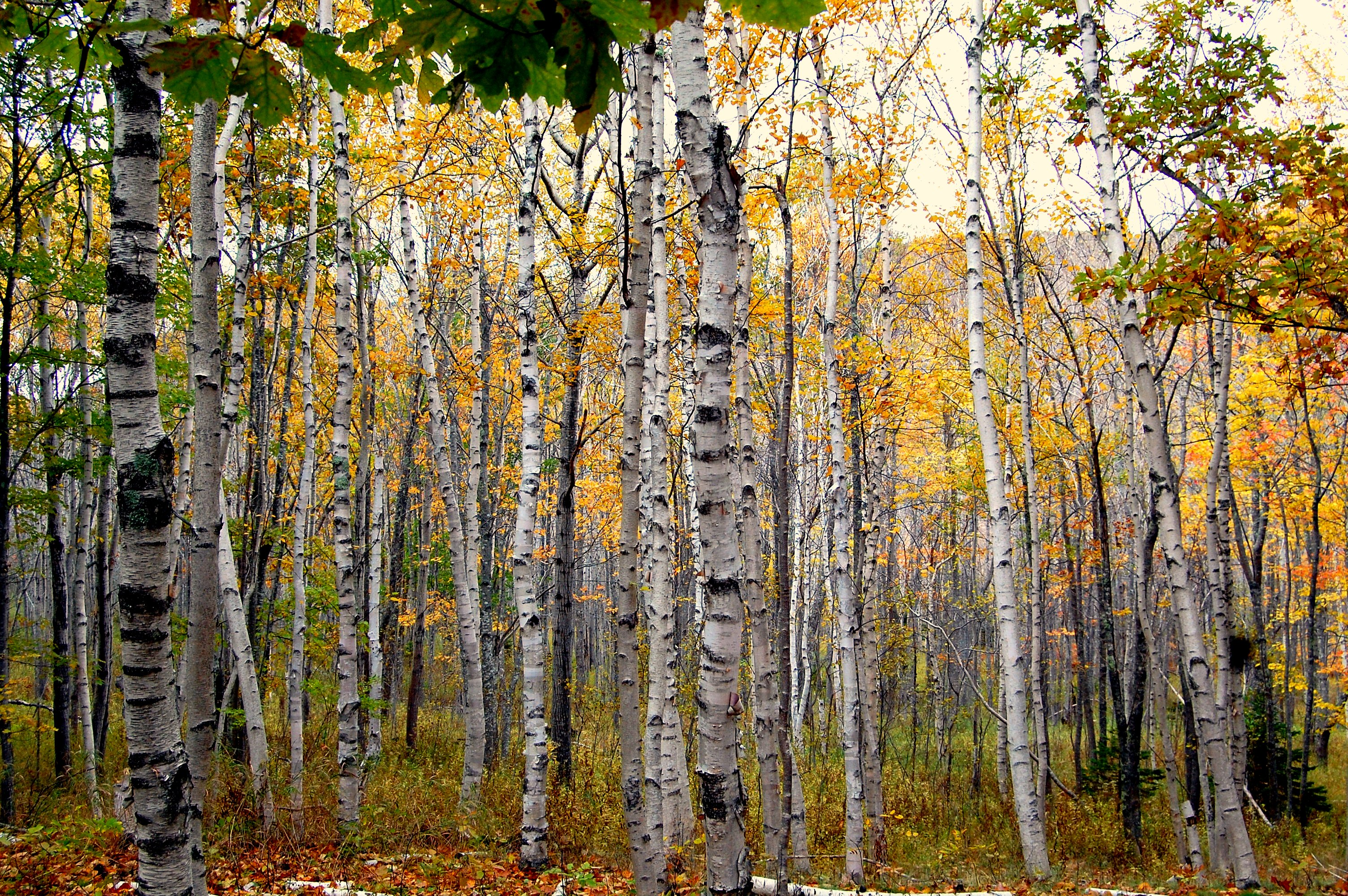
- Paper birch forest in Maine

Conservation status
- Least Concern (IUCN 3.1)

- Secure (NatureServe)

Scientific classification
- Kingdom: Plantae
- Clade: Tracheophytes
- Clade: Angiosperms
- Clade: Eudicots
- Clade: Rosids
- Order: Fagales
- Family: Betulaceae
- Genus: Betula
- Subgenus: Betula subg. Betula
- Species: B. papyrifera

Binomial name
- Betula papyrifera Marshall
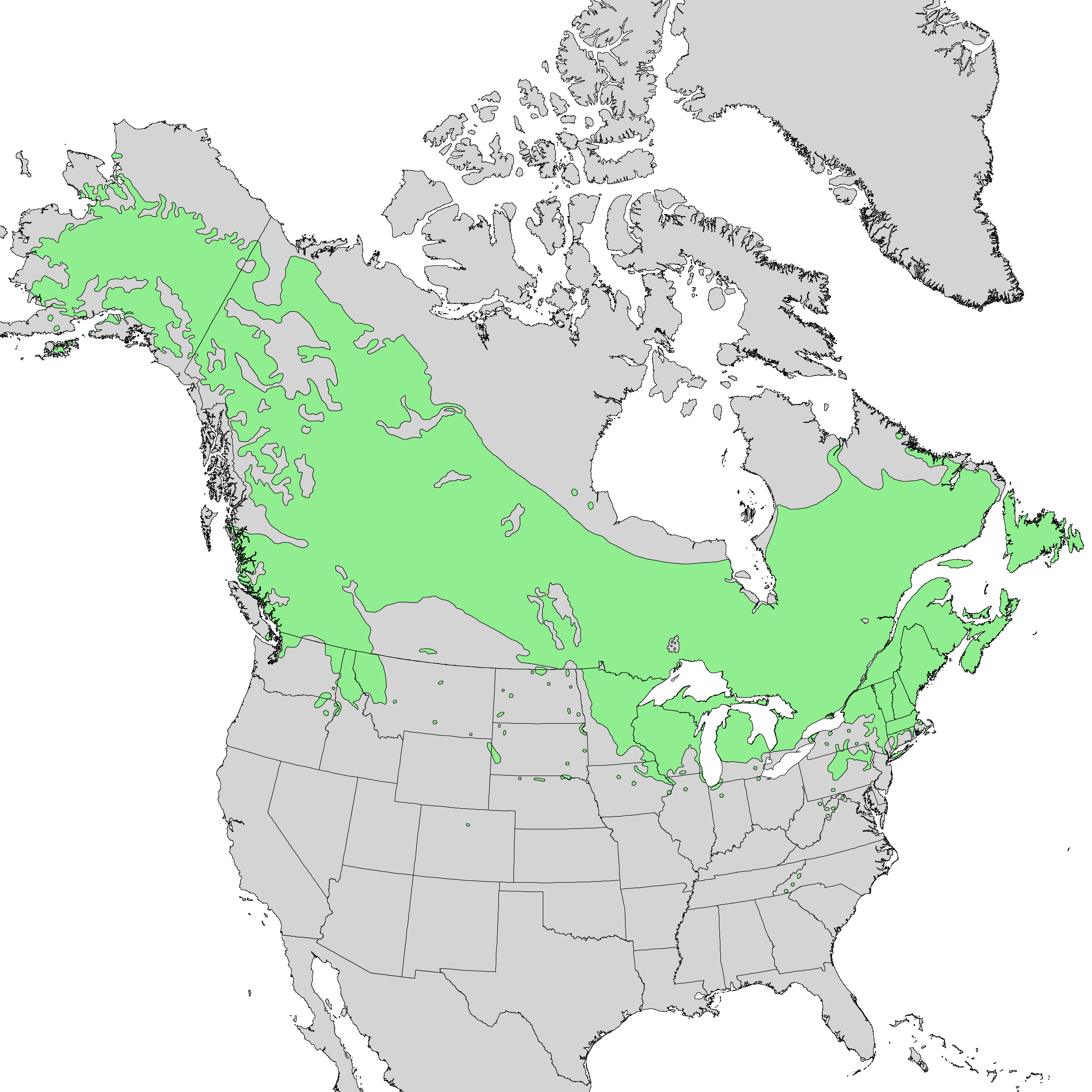
- Natural range

Synonyms
- B. alba var. commutata Regel; B. alba var. cordifolia (Regel) Regel; B. alba var. cordifolia (Regel) Fernald; B. alba var. elobata Fernald; B. alba subsp. excelsa (Aiton) Regel; B. alba subsp. latifolia (Tausch) Regel; B. alba var. papyrifera (Marshall) Spach; B. alba subsp. papyrifera (Marshall) Regel; B. dahurica var. americana Regel; B. excelsa Aiton; B. grandis Schrad.; B. latifolia Tausch; B. lenta var. papyrifera (Marshall) Castigl.; B. lyalliana (Koehne) Bean; B. montanensis Rydb. ex B.T.Butler; B. papyracea Aiton; B. pirifolia K. Koch; B. subcordata Rydb. ex B.T.Butler

= Betula papyrifera =

Species of tree

Betula papyrifera (paper birch, also known as (American) white birch and canoe birch) is a short-lived species of birch native to northern North America. Paper birch is named after the tree's thin white bark, which often peels in paper-like layers from the trunk. Paper birch is often one of the first species to colonize a burned area within the northern latitudes, and is an important species for moose browsing. Primary commercial uses for paper birch wood are as boltwood and sawlogs, while secondary products include firewood and pulpwood. It is the provincial tree of Saskatchewan and the state tree of New Hampshire.

== Description ==
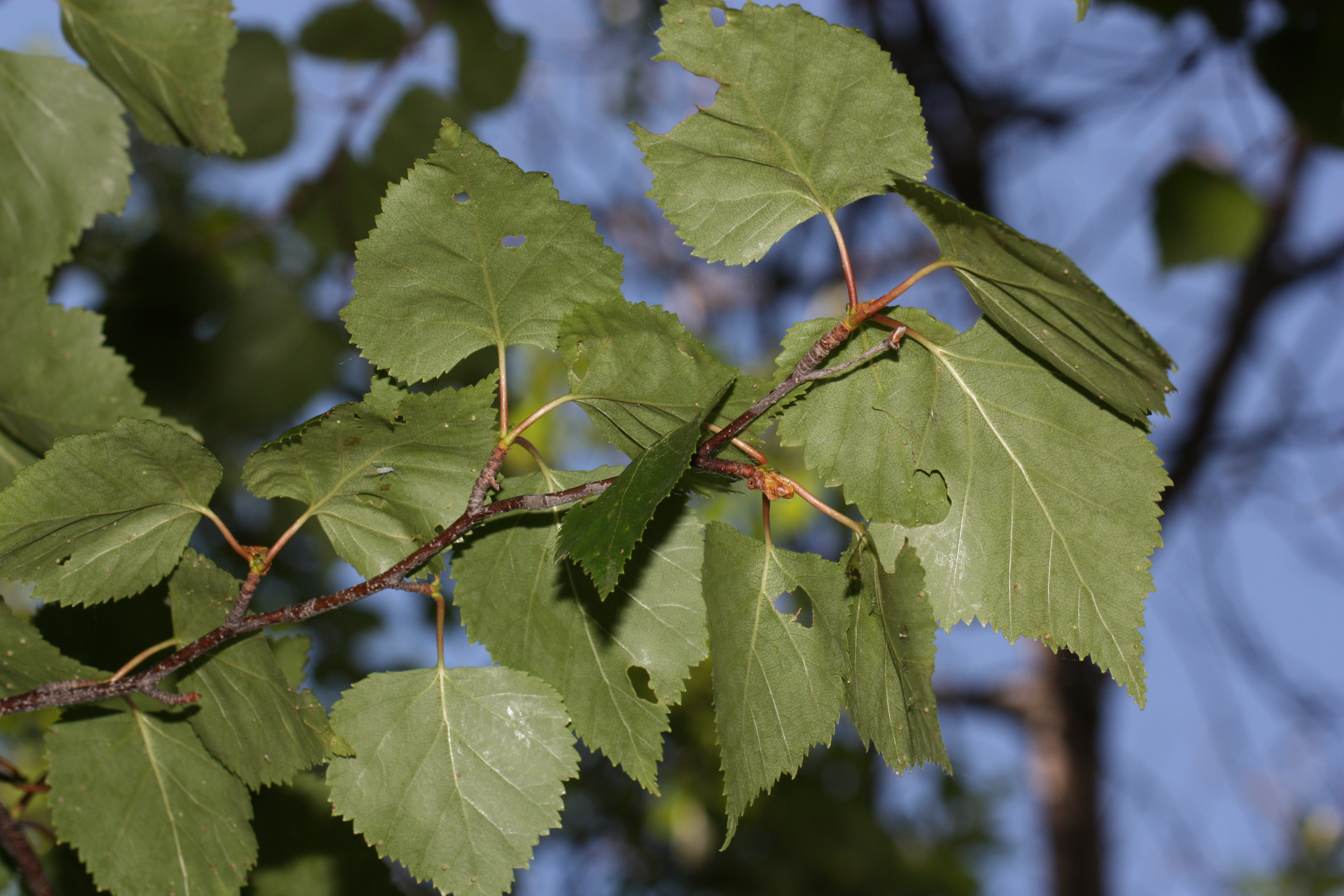
Leaves are doubly serrated with sharp teeth.

Betula papyrifera is a medium-sized deciduous tree typically reaching 20 metres (66 feet) tall, and exceptionally to 40 m (130 ft) with a trunk up to 75 centimetres (30 inches) in diameter. Within forests, it often grows with a single trunk but when grown as a landscape tree it may develop multiple trunks or branch close to the ground.

Paper birch is a typically short-lived species. It handles heat and humidity poorly and may live only 30 years in zones six and up, while trees in colder-climate regions can grow for more than 100 years. B. papyrifera will grow in many soil types, from steep rocky outcrops to flat muskegs of the boreal forest. Best growth occurs in deeper, well drained to dry soils, depending on the location.

- In older trees, the bark is white, commonly brightly so, flaking in fine horizontal strips to reveal a pinkish or salmon-colored inner bark. It often has small black marks and scars. In individuals younger than five years, the bark appears a brown red color with white lenticels, making the tree much harder to distinguish from other birches. The bark is highly weather-resistant. It has a high oil content and this gives it its waterproof and weather-resistant characteristics. Often, the wood of a downed paper birch will rot away, leaving the hollow bark intact.
- The leaves are dark green and smooth on the upper surface; the lower surface is often pubescent on the veins. They are alternately arranged on the stem, oval to triangular in shape, 4–10 cm (2–4 in) long and about two-thirds as wide. The leaf is rounded at the base and tapering to an acutely pointed tip. The leaves have a doubly serrated margin with relatively sharp teeth. Each leaf has a petiole about 2.5 cm (1 in) long that connects it to the stems.
- The fall color is a bright yellow color that contributes to the bright colors within the northern deciduous forest.
- The leaf buds are conical and small and green-colored with brown edges.
- The stems are a reddish-brown color and may be somewhat hairy when young.
- The flowers are wind-pollinated catkins; the female flowers are greenish and 3.8 cm (1 1/2 in) long growing from the tips of twigs. The male (staminate) flowers are 5–10 cm (2–4 in) long and a brownish color. The tree flowers from mid-April to June depending on location. Paper birch is monoecious, meaning that one plant has both male and female flowers.
- The fruit matures in the fall. The mature fruit is composed of numerous tiny winged seeds packed between the catkin bracts. They drop between September and spring. At 15 years of age, the tree will start producing seeds but will be in peak seed production between 40 and 70 years. The seed production is irregular, with a heavy seed crop produced typically every other year and with at least some seeds being produced every year. In average seed years, 2,500,000 seeds per hectare (1,000,000 per acre) are produced, but in bumper years 86,000,000/ha (35,000,000/acre) may be produced. The seeds are light and blow in the wind to new areas; they also may blow along the surface of snow.
- The roots are generally shallow and occupy the upper 60 cm (24 in) of the soil and do not form taproots. High winds are more likely to break the trunk than to uproot the tree.

== Genetics and taxonomy ==
B. papyrifera hybridizes with other species within the genus Betula.

Several varieties are recognized:

- B. p. var papyrifera the typical paper birch
- B. p. var cordifolia the eastern paper birch (now a separate species); see Betula cordifolia
- B. p. var kenaica Alaskan paper birch (also treated as a separate species by some authors); see Betula kenaica
- B. p. var subcordata Northwestern paper birch
- B. p. var. neoalaskana Alaska paper birch (although this is often treated as a separate species); see Betula neoalaskana

== Distribution ==
Betula papyrifera is mostly confined to Canada and the far northern United States. It is found in interior (var. humilus) and south-central (var. kenaica) Alaska and in all provinces and territories of Canada, except Nunavut, as well as the far northern continental United States. Isolated patches are found as far south as the Hudson Valley of New York and Pennsylvania, northern Connecticut, and Washington. High elevation stands are also in mountains to North Carolina, New Mexico, and Colorado. The most southerly stand in the Western United States is located in Long Canyon in the City of Boulder Open Space and Mountain Parks. This is an isolated Pleistocene relict that most likely reflects the southern reach of boreal vegetation into the area during the last Ice Age.

== Ecology ==
In Alaska, paper birch often naturally grows in pure stands by itself or with black or white spruce. In the eastern and central regions of its range, it is often associated with red spruce and balsam fir. It may also be associated with big-toothed aspen, yellow birch, Betula populifolia, and maples.

Shrubs often associated with paper birch in the eastern part of its range include beaked hazel (Corylus cornuta), common bearberry (Arctostaphylos uva-ursi), dwarf bush-honeysuckle (Diervilla lonicera), wintergreen (Gaultheria procumbens), wild sarsaparilla (Aralia nudicaulis), blueberries (Vaccinium spp.), raspberries and blackberries (Rubus spp.), elderberry (Sambucus spp.), and hobblebush (Viburnum alnifolium).

=== Successional relationships ===
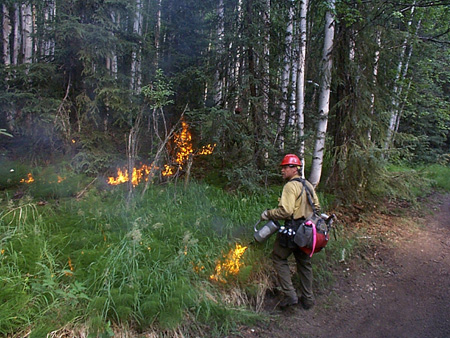
Prescribed fire in a black spruce-paper birch-quaking aspen community in boreal Alaska

Betula papyrifera is a pioneer species, meaning it is often one of the first trees to grow in an area after other trees are removed by some sort of disturbance. Typical disturbances colonized by paper birch are wildfire, avalanche, or windthrow areas where the wind has blown down all trees. When it grows in these pioneer, or early successional, woodlands, it often forms stands of trees where it is the only species.

Paper birch is considered well adapted to fires because it recovers quickly by means of reseeding the area or regrowth from the burned tree. The lightweight seeds are easily carried by the wind to burned areas, where they quickly germinate and grow into new trees. Paper birch is adapted to ecosystems where fires occur every 50 to 150 years For example, it is frequently an early invader after fire in black spruce boreal forests. As paper birch is a pioneer species, finding it within mature or climax forests is rare because it will be overcome by trees that are more shade-tolerant as secondary succession progresses.

For example, in Alaskan boreal forests, a paper birch stand 20 years after a fire may have 3,000–6,000 trees per acre (7,400–14,800/ha), but after 60 to 90 years, the number of trees will decrease to 500–800 trees per acre (1,200–2,000/ha) as spruce replaces the birch. After approximately 75 years, the birch will start dying and by 125 years, most paper birch will have disappeared unless another fire burns the area.

Paper birch trees themselves have varied reactions to wildfire. A group, or stand, of paper birch is not particularly flammable. The canopy often has a high moisture content and the understory is often lush green. As such, conifer crown fires often stop once they reach a stand of paper birch or become slower-moving ground fires. Since these stands are fire-resistant, they may become seed trees to reseed the area around them that was burned. However, in dry periods, paper birch is flammable and will burn rapidly. As the bark is flammable, it often will burn and may girdle the tree.

=== Wildlife ===
Birch bark is a winter staple food for moose. The nutritional quality is poor because of the large quantities of lignin, which make digestion difficult, but is important to wintering moose because of its sheer abundance. Moose prefer paper birch over aspen, alder, and balsam poplar, but they prefer willow (Salix spp.) over birch and the other species listed. Although moose consume large amounts of paper birch in the winter, if they were to eat only paper birch, they may starve.

Although white-tailed deer consider birch a "secondary-choice food," it is an important dietary component. In Minnesota, white-tailed deer eat considerable amounts of paper birch leaves in the fall. Snowshoe hares browse paper birch seedlings, and grouse eat the buds. Porcupines and beavers feed on the inner bark. The seeds of paper birch are an important part of the diet of many birds and small mammals, including chickadees, redpolls, voles, and ruffed grouse. Yellow bellied sapsuckers drill holes in the bark of paper birch to get at the sap; this is one of their favorite trees for feeding on.

== Conservation ==
As of 2023, the conservation status of paper birch is considered of least concern according to the International Union for Conservation of Nature (IUCN). However, the species is considered vulnerable in Indiana and Nebraska, imperiled in Illinois, Virginia, and West Virginia, and critically imperiled in Colorado and Tennessee. These areas represent the southerly and southwesterly edge of the paper birch's range.

== Uses ==
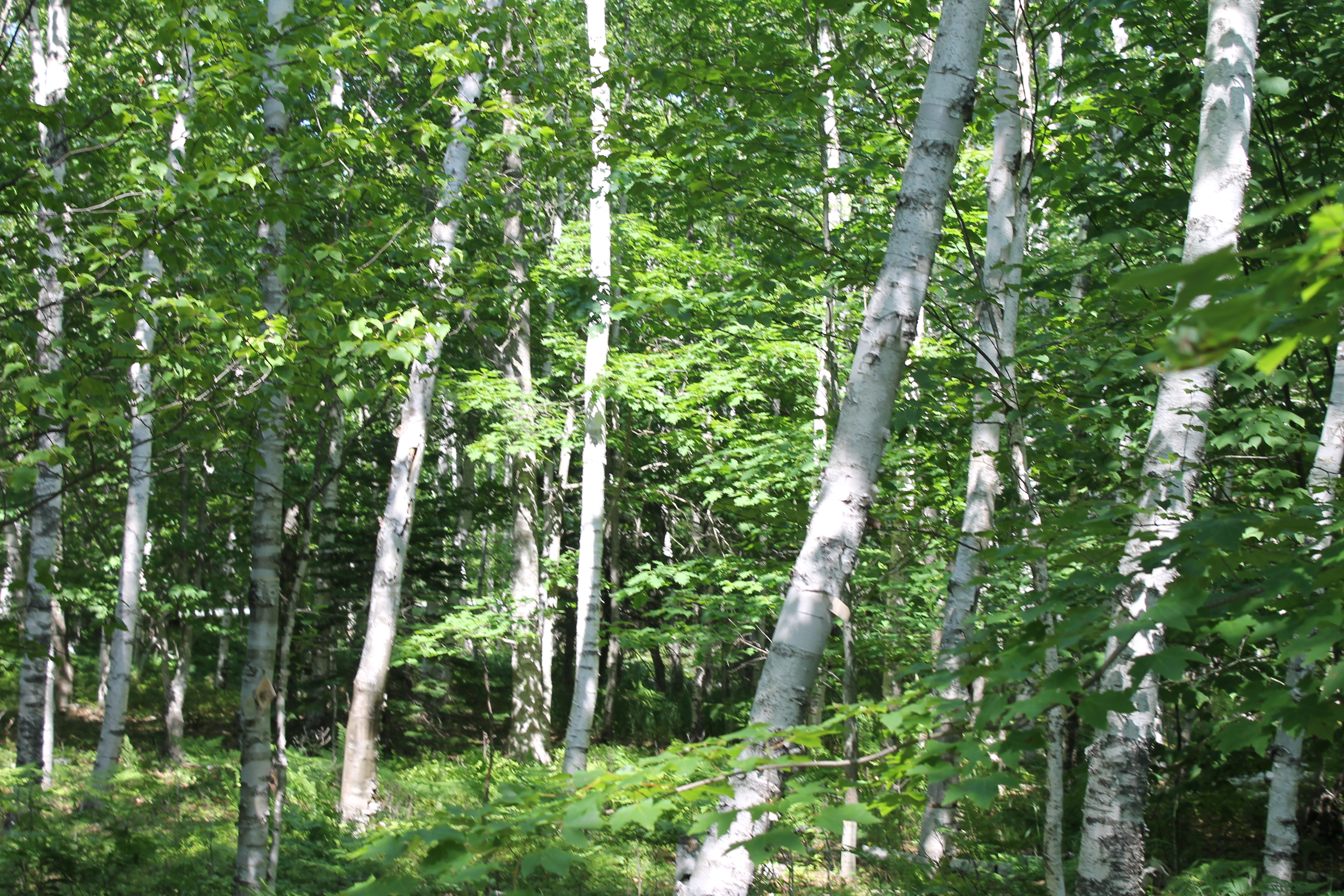
Paper birch at Acadia National Park in Maine, informally referred to as "white birch"

Betula papyrifera has a moderately heavy white wood. It makes excellent high-yielding firewood if seasoned properly. The dried wood has a density of 37.4 lb/cu ft (0.599 g/cm^{3}) and an energy density 20,300,000 BTU/cord (5,900,000 kJ/m^{3}). Although paper birch does not have a very high overall economic value, it is used in furniture, flooring, popsicle sticks, pulpwood (for paper), plywood, and oriented strand board. The wood can also be made into spears, bows, arrows, snowshoes, sleds, and other items. When used as pulp for paper, the stems and other nontrunk wood are lower in quantity and quality of fibers, and consequently the fibers have less mechanical strength; nonetheless, this wood is still suitable for use in paper.

The sap is boiled down to produce birch syrup. The raw sap contains 0.9% carbohydrates (glucose, fructose, sucrose) as compared to 2 percent to 3 percent within sugar maple sap. The sap flows later in the season than maples. Currently, only a few small-scale operations in Alaska and Yukon produce birch syrup from this species.

=== Bark ===
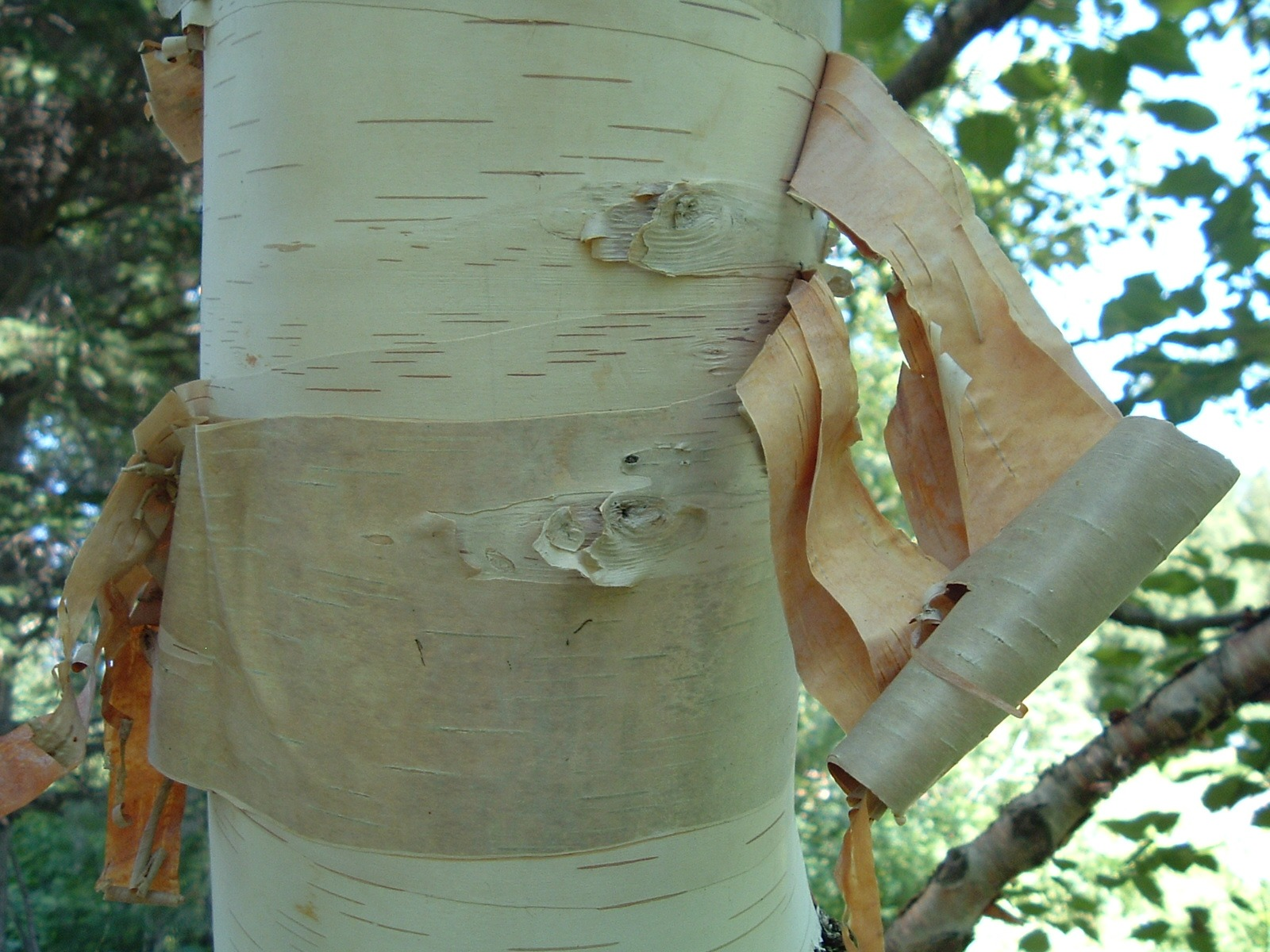
Peeling bark

Its bark is an excellent fire starter; it ignites at high temperatures even when wet. The bark has an energy density of 5,740 cal/g (24,000 J/g) and 3,209 cal/cm^{3} (220,000 J/cu in), the highest per unit weight of 24 species tested.

Birch bark is used in a number of crafts by various Native American tribes (e.g. Ojibwe). In the Anishinaabe language birch bark is called wiigwaas. Panels of bark can be fitted or sewn together to make cartons and boxes (Wiigwaasi-makak). The bark is also used to create a durable waterproof layer in the construction of sod-roofed houses. Many indigenous groups (i.e., Wabanaki peoples) use birchbark for making various items, such as canoes, containers, and wigwams. It is also used as a backing for porcupine quillwork and moosehair embroidery. Thin sheets can be employed as a medium for the art of birchbark biting.

=== Plantings ===
Paper birch is planted to reclaim old mines and other disturbed sites, often bare-root or small saplings are planted when this is the goal. Since paper birch is an adaptable pioneer species, it is a prime candidate for reforesting drastically disturbed areas.

Paper birch is frequently planted as an ornamental because of its graceful form and attractive bark. The bark changes to the white color at about 3 years of growth. Paper birch grows best in USDA zones 2–6, due to its intolerance of high temperatures. Betula nigra, or river birch, is recommended for warm-climate areas warmer than zone 6, where paper birch is rarely successful. B. papyrifera is more resistant to the bronze birch borer than Betula pendula, which is similarly planted as a landscape tree.

== Pests ==
Bronze birch borer is a major pest among birch species. Under repeated infestation or stress to the tree from other sources, bronze birch borers may kill the tree. The insect bores into the sapwood, beginning at the top of the tree and causing death of the tree crown. The insect has a D-shaped emergence hole where it chews out of the tree. Healthy trees are resistant to the borer, but when grown in less than ideal conditions, the defense mechanisms of the tree may not function properly. Chemical controls exist.

Birch skeletonizers are moths which lay their eggs on the surfaces of birch leaves. Upon hatching, the larvae feed on the undersides of the leaves and cause browning.

Birch leafminer is a species of sawfly and a common pest that feeds from the inside of the leaf and causes the leaf to turn brown. It was introduced to the United States in the 1920s. The first generation appears in May but there will be several generations per year. Severe infestations may stress the tree and make it more vulnerable to the bronze birch borer.
