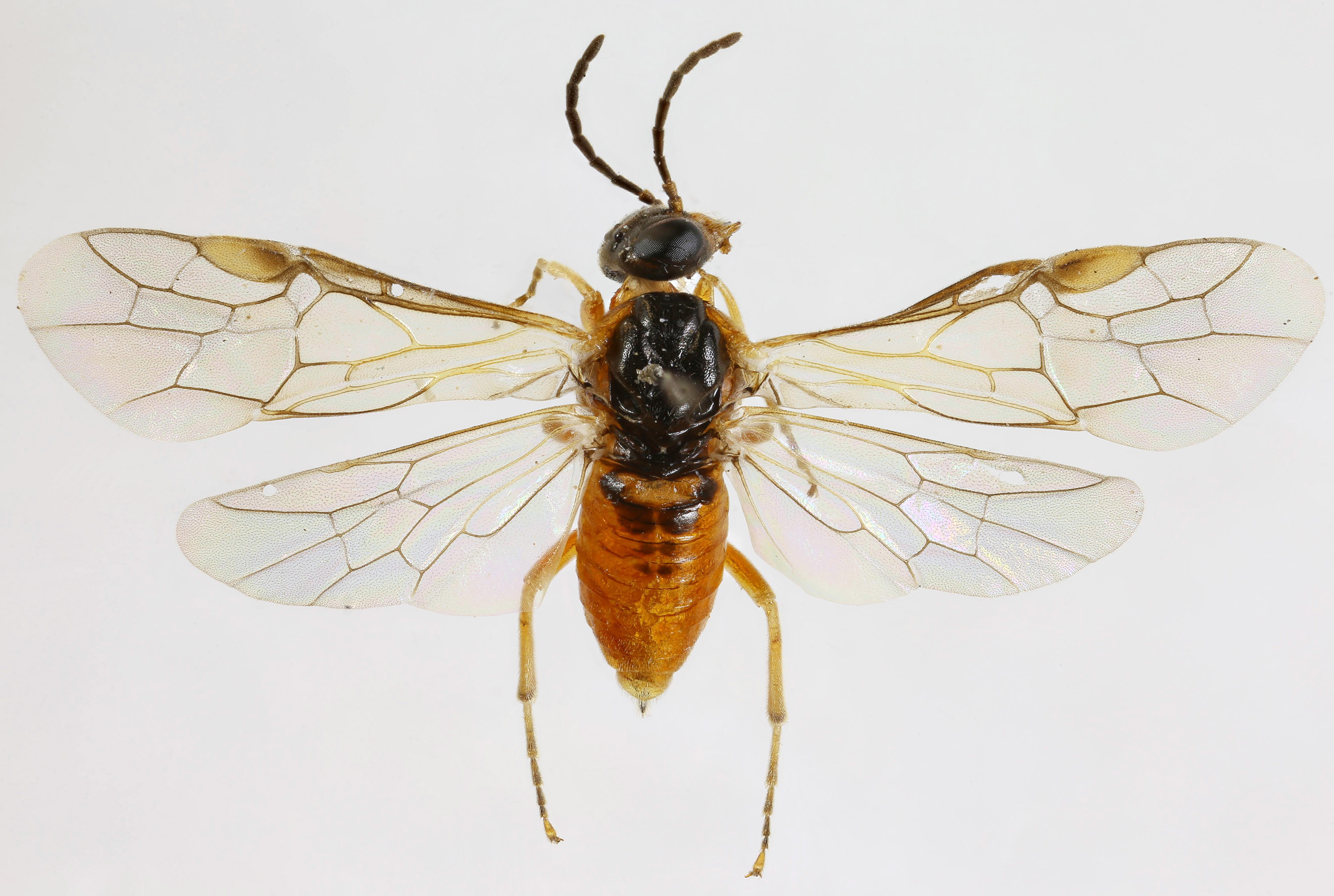
- Hoplocampa pectoralis Minera, North Wales

Scientific classification
- Domain: Eukaryota
- Kingdom: Animalia
- Phylum: Arthropoda
- Class: Insecta
- Order: Hymenoptera
- Suborder: Symphyta
- Family: Tenthredinidae
- Genus: Hoplocampa
- Species: H. pectoralis

Binomial name
- Hoplocampa pectoralis Thomson, 1871

= Hoplocampa pectoralis =

Species of sawfly

Hoplocampa pectoralis is a Palearctic species of sawfly.
