= Hoplocampa testudinea =

Scientific classification
- Kingdom: Animalia
- Phylum: Arthropoda
- Clade: Pancrustacea
- Class: Insecta
- Order: Hymenoptera
- Suborder: Symphyta
- Family: Tenthredinidae
- Genus: Hoplocampa
- Species: H. testudinea

Binomial name
- Hoplocampa testudinea Klug, 1816

Species of sawfly

Hoplocampa testudinea, the apple sawfly or European apple sawfly, is a species of sawfly in the family Tenthredinidae. It is native to Europe but has been accidentally introduced into North America where it became invasive. The larvae feed inside the developing fruits of the apple tree.

== Description ==
The adult apple sawfly is up to 5 mm (0.2 in) long with a brownish-black head and thorax and a brown abdomen. The larva is a caterpillar-like grub with a brown head and white body, growing to about 10 mm (0.4 in) when fully developed. It can be distinguished from the codling moth (Cydia pomonella) larva by being creamy-white, with seven pairs of abdominal legs, while the latter is pinkish-white and has five pairs. The sawfly larva is active in the fruits two or three weeks earlier in the season than the codling larva.

== Distribution ==
Native to Europe, this sawfly is widespread between 60° and 40° north latitude. Populations are also known in the western areas of the former USSR and in northern Turkey. It was first detected in North America on Long Island, New York, in 1939, and has since spread across the northeastern United States, and into Canada, reaching Quebec by 1979 and Ontario by 1987. A population has been present on Vancouver Island, British Columbia, since being detected in 1940.

== Life cycle ==
Adult insects emerge in late spring at the time apple trees are in flower, and are attracted towards the open flowers on warm sunny days. Eggs are laid in slits cut just below the calyx, usually one egg per bloom. The eggs hatch about five days later, when 80% of the petals have fallen, and the newly hatched larvae make their way into the immature fruitlets, first burrowing under the skin and later tunnelling into the centre. As they grow larger, they tunnel outwards and move into an adjoining fruitlet, making a large entry hole which gets clogged with brown, sticky frass. When their development is complete and they have tunneled into several fruitlets, the damaged apples fall to the ground. The larvae make papery cocoons 10 to 25 cm (4 to 10 in) underground in which to overwinter. Pupation takes place in this cocoon in the spring but some individuals spend two winters underground. Controlled experiments in the late 1970s showed 17% – 26% of adults emerged a year after 250 larvae cocooned, while 1% – 9% emerged in the second year. Two solitary adults were recorded emerging the third year after cocooning. The pupae are susceptible to desiccation and a number of fungi, such as Paecilomyces fumosoroseus.

== Damage ==
When a newly hatched larva burrows under the skin of the fruit it leaves a characteristic ribbon scar; if the larva dies before it tunnels to the core, the fruit can continue to grow and later be harvested. More seriously damaged fruitlets fall from the tree. Certain varieties of dessert apple such as Discovery and Worcester Pearmain are particularly susceptible. Pears are unaffected. Sticky traps can be used to catch adult sawflies to monitor the levels of attack and assess whether pesticides would be economical to apply.

== Control ==
In Europe, the apple sawfly has a number of predators and parasites which help to keep it under control. One of these is the parasitoid wasp Lathrolestes ensator which is a parasite of the larvae. In North America, these natural enemies are not present and the pest causes more significant damage to apple crops. In an attempt to alleviate this situation, L. ensator has been imported from Europe to help act as a control.

Biological pest control has been investigated using the entomogenous nematodes Steinernema carpocapsae, Steinernema feltiae and Heterorhabditis bacteriophora. These were effective in the laboratory when used as a foliar spray, and in a field trial as a ground drench against the larvae. These treatments may also control plum curculio (Conotrachelus nenuphar) as part of an integrated pest management programme. Research has shown that quassin and neoquassin, extracted from Quassia amara, can provide control of H. testudinea in organic agriculture; commercial formulations are used in Germany and Switzerland, but are expensive. Several species of ascomycote entomopathogenic fungi have also been used as control agents. Metarhizium anisopliae (sensulato), Beauveria bassiana (sensulato), Isaria farinosa, Isaria fumosorosea, Aspergillus flavus and Lecanicillium lecanii have all been shown to result in high mortality rates of larvae at the time the apples fall to the soil. In Swedish and Danish orchards, Metarhizium brunneum is one of the most common entomopathogenic fungi species.
