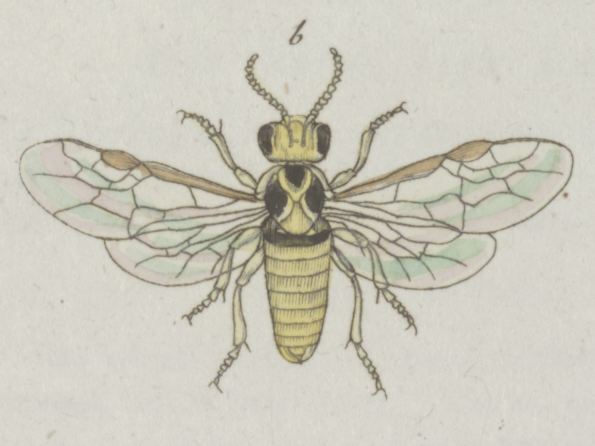

Scientific classification
- Kingdom: Animalia
- Phylum: Arthropoda
- Class: Insecta
- Order: Hymenoptera
- Suborder: Symphyta
- Family: Tenthredinidae
- Genus: Hoplocampa
- Species: H. flava

Binomial name
- Hoplocampa flava (Linnaeus, 1761)

Synonyms
- Allantus ferrugineus Panzer, 1803

= Hoplocampa flava =

Species of sawfly

Hoplocampa flava, commonly referred to as the plum sawfly, is a species of sawfly. It has been found near the Mediterranean basin, western Europe, Estonia, Latvia, Lithuania, the Caucasus and from eastern Russia to the Ural Mountains. It has been known to be locally common in these areas. It is a common pest of plum orchards.

== Morphology ==
The adult fly has a brown-yellow coloring and is 4–5 mm (0.16–0.20 in) in length; it has 9 segmented antennae, with a similar yellowish color. It has transparent wings with brownish-yellow veins. Its larvae are a whitish color and are around 9 to 11 mm long, with slightly curved, brownish (sometimes orange/yellowish green) and have three pairs of thoracic legs and 7 pairs of abdominal prolegs.

== Life cycle ==
Hoplocampa flava is known to nest in the flowerbuds of plum, cherry plum, cherry, apricot, or sloe. Adults will plant eggs in the buds, following the hatch the larvae burrow into the developing fruits because of this the fruits secrete a oozy substance and prematurely fall off the flower. Following this the larvae burrow into the soil, then return later as an adult sawfly. The bugs also have a specific flight pattern between April and May.

The sawfly usually only lasts one single generation, however some may last significantly longer. During the springtime, female Hoplocampa flava, feed on the nectar and pollen, and burrow their eggs on the calyx of the plant. On average each female produces 60 eggs, just one larvae can destroy up to 6 fruits. The larvae emerge right after the blossoming bore and devour the unripe fruits. As recorded previously the then mature larvae dig into the soil and hibernate during summer and winter.
