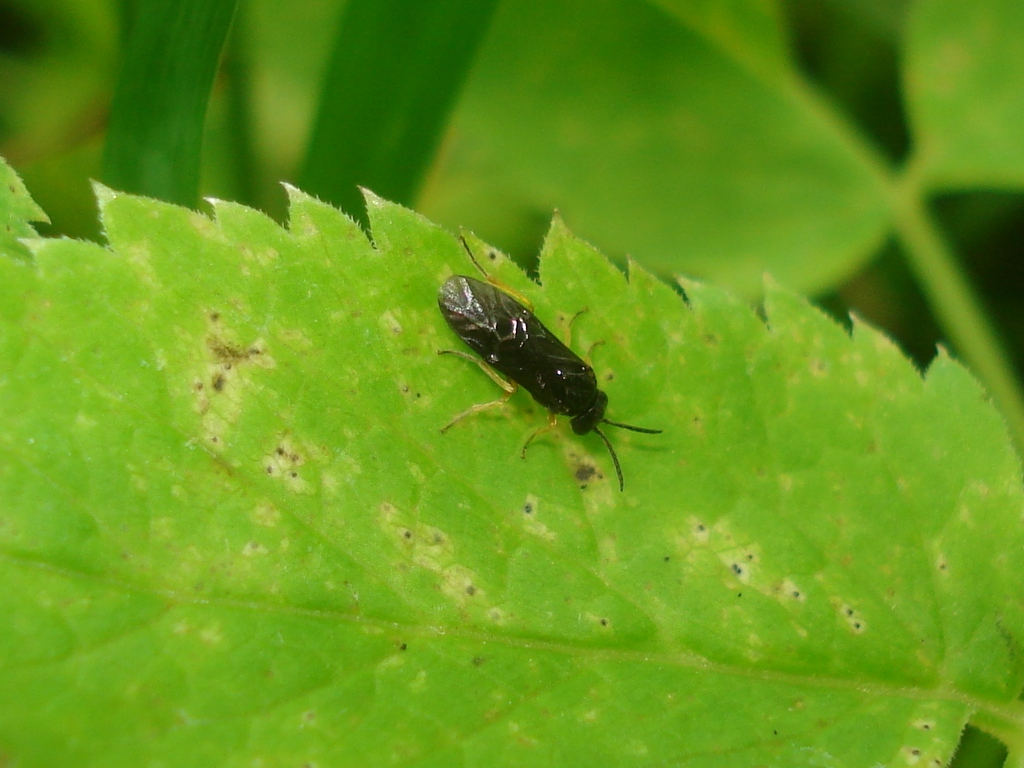

Scientific classification
- Domain: Eukaryota
- Kingdom: Animalia
- Phylum: Arthropoda
- Class: Insecta
- Order: Hymenoptera
- Suborder: Symphyta
- Family: Tenthredinidae
- Genus: Profenusa
- Species: P. thomsoni

Binomial name
- Profenusa thomsoni (Konow, 1886)

Synonyms
- Fenusa thomsoni Konow, 1886; Emphytus pumilio Hartig, 1837; Fenusa pumilio Hartig, 1837; Fenusa pumilio C. G. Thomson, 1871; Fenusa pumilio Konow, 1886; Fenusella thomsoni (Konow, 1886); Profenusa alumna (MacGillivray, 1923)

= Profenusa thomsoni =

Species of sawfly

Profenusa thomsoni, the amber-marked birch leaf miner, is a species of sawfly in the family Tenthredinidae. It is native to the Palearctic realm but has spread to North America. The larvae feed on the foliage of birch trees.

== Description ==
The adult Profenusa thomsoni is black and about 3 mm (0.12 in) in length and fly-like in appearance. The whitish larva has short legs, dark markings on the first segment of the thorax, and two black spots on each of the second and third segments. It develops inside a leaf blade, the egg usually being laid close to the midrib and the larva hollowing out a "blotch"-shaped cavity. There are six instars, the last stage taking place on the ground as the larva searches out a place to pupate. A very similar sawfly, Fenusa pumila, also mines birch leaves, but tends to infest young, expanding leaves, and causes crinkling of the leaf blade, whereas P. thomsoni infests mature leaves which remain undistorted.

== Distribution and habitat ==
Profenusa thomsoni has a widespread distribution in the Palearctic realm in Europe and Asia. It was introduced into North America in the early twentieth century where it became invasive. By 1970 it had spread to Alberta, and by 1996, to Alaska. The larvae feed on a number of species of birch (Betula) and other members of the family Betulaceae.

== Life cycle ==
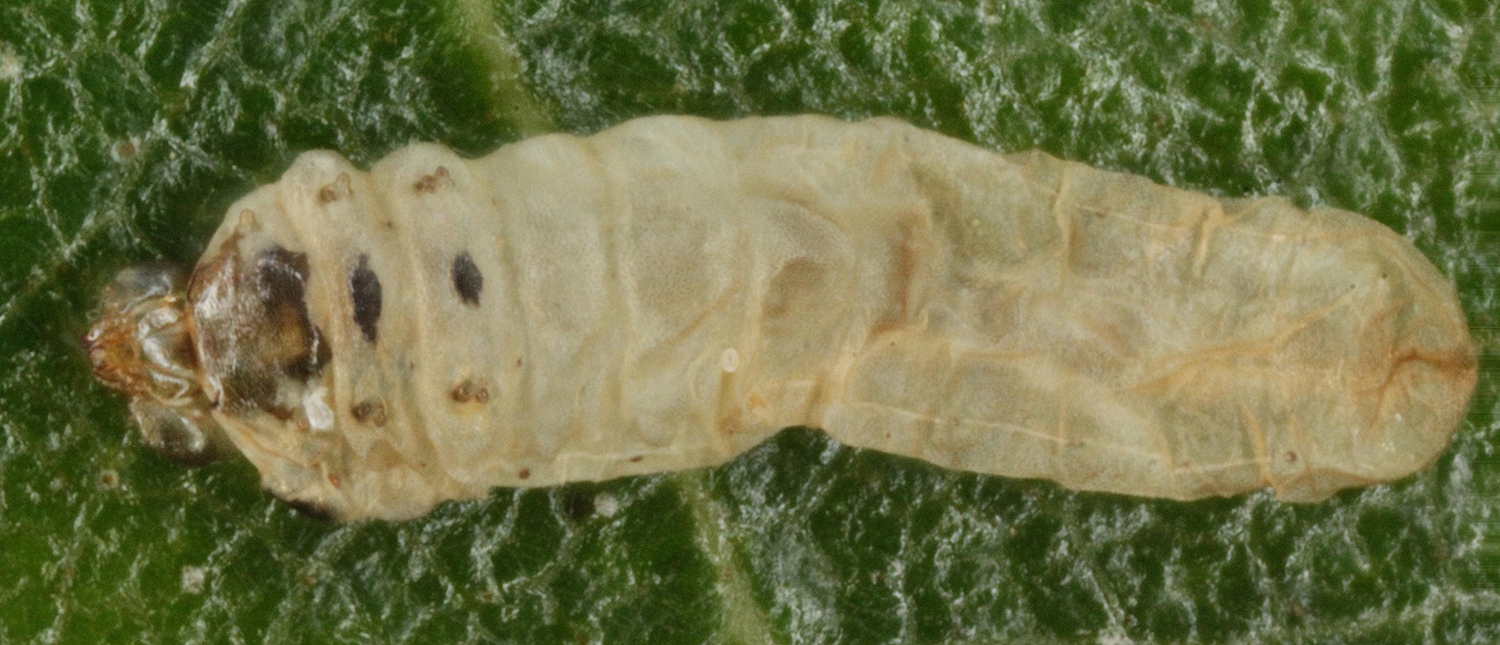
Larva

All individuals of Profenusa thomsoni are female and reproduction is by parthenogenesis. The eggs are laid inside mature leaves of the host tree, usually near the midrib. The larvae feed on the mesophyll tissue inside the leaf, creating a pale brownish "blotch"-shaped mine. Some leaves may have multiple larvae developing inside them. When fully mature, the larvae emerge through the underside of the leaf and fall to the ground, where they make chambers in which to pupate. They overwinter in these, emerging as adults in July and August the following year. There is a single generation per year.

== Ecology ==
P. thomsoni and F. pumila often occur on the same tree, and heavy infestations may cause extensive defoliation. P. thomsoni is uncommon in Europe, but after its introduction into North America, populations built up rapidly. In Alberta, populations of P. thomsoni plummeted in the early 1990s, and have remained low ever since. This was found to be associated with the larvae being attacked by the parasitic wasp Lathrolestes luteolator; hitherto the wasp had parasitised other species of sawfly larva, and this was the first occasion that this particular host/parasite relationship had been observed. The wasps lay eggs in late-stage larvae of the leaf miner, and the wasps' larvae mainly develop in the overwintering prepupae of their hosts.
