= Fenusa =

Scientific classification
- Domain: Eukaryota
- Kingdom: Animalia
- Phylum: Arthropoda
- Class: Insecta
- Order: Hymenoptera
- Suborder: Symphyta
- Family: Tenthredinidae
- Tribe: Fenusini
- Genus: Fenusa; Leach, 1817

Genus of sawflies

Fenusa is a genus of common sawflies in the family Tenthredinidae. There are about 11 described species in Fenusa.

== Species ==
These 11 species belong to the genus Fenusa:

- Fenusa alaskana Kincaid
- Fenusa altenhoferi (Liston, 1993)
- Fenusa carpinifoliae (Liston, 1993)
- Fenusa dohrnii (Tischbein) (European alder leafminer)
- Fenusa julia Smith & Eiseman, 2017
- Fenusa laevinota (Benson, 1968)
- Fenusa pumila Leach, 1817 (birch leafminer)
- Fenusa pusilla (Lepeletier)
- Fenusa ulmi Sundevall (elm leafminer)
- † Fenusa primula Rohwer, 1908
- † Lithoryssus parvus (Brues, 1906)
