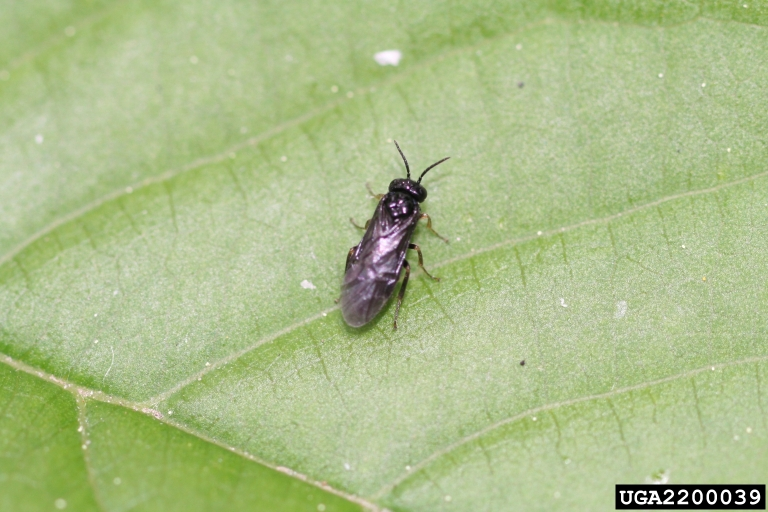
- Elm leafminer (Fenusa ulmi) on Siberian Elm (Ulmus pumila) leaf

Scientific classification
- Domain: Eukaryota
- Kingdom: Animalia
- Phylum: Arthropoda
- Class: Insecta
- Order: Hymenoptera
- Suborder: Symphyta
- Family: Tenthredinidae
- Genus: Fenusa
- Species: F. ulmi

Binomial name
- Fenusa ulmi Sundevall, 1847

= Fenusa ulmi =

Species of sawfly

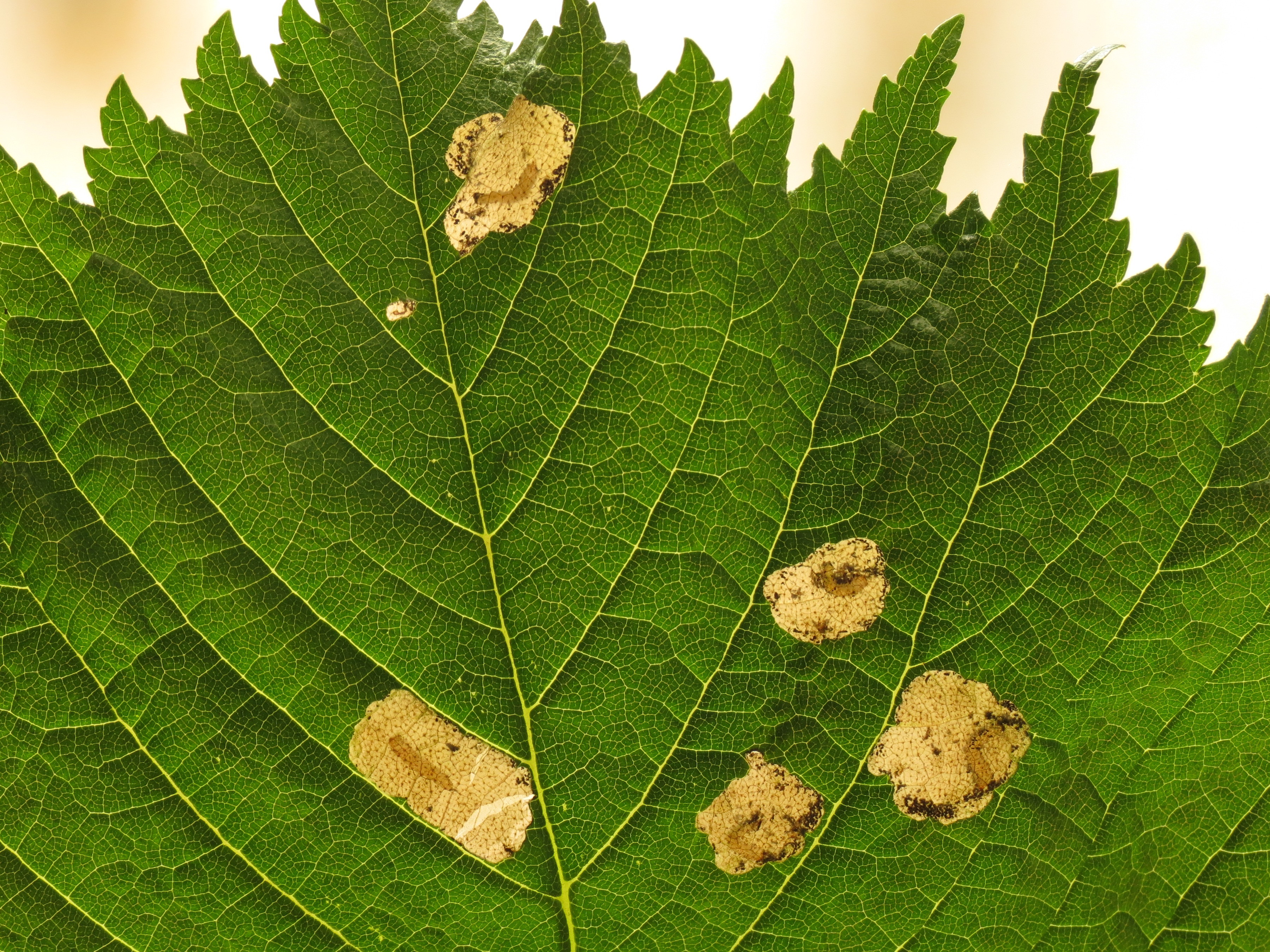
Elm leafminer (Fenusa ulmi), larva and mine on Wych Elm (Ulmus glabra), Søborg, Denmark, 31 May 2014

Fenusa ulmi, the elm leafminer, is a species of common sawfly in the family Tenthredinidae. It is found in Europe.
