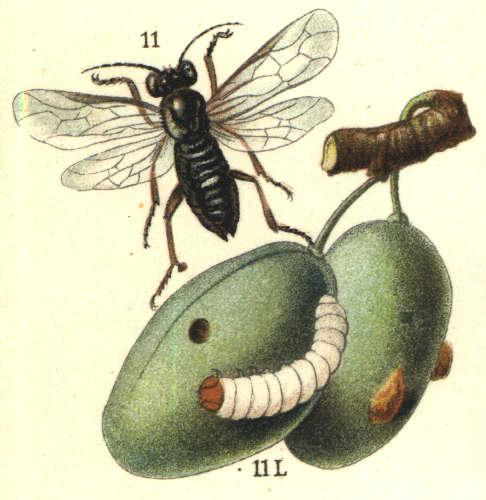
- Hoplocampa minuta

Scientific classification
- Kingdom: Animalia
- Phylum: Arthropoda
- Clade: Pancrustacea
- Class: Insecta
- Order: Hymenoptera
- Suborder: Symphyta
- Family: Tenthredinidae
- Subfamily: Nematinae
- Genus: Hoplocampa; Hartig, 1837

Species
- See text

= Hoplocampa =

Genus of sawflies

Hoplocampa is a genus of hymenopteran sawflies in the family Tenthredinidae.

== Species ==
According to:

- Hoplocampa alpina (Zetterstedt, 1838)
- Hoplocampa ariae Benson, 1933
- Hoplocampa bioculata
- Hoplocampa brevis (Klug, 1816)
- Hoplocampa cantoti Chevin, 1986
- Hoplocampa chamaemespili Masutti & Covassi, 1980
- Hoplocampa chrysorrhoea (Klug, 1816)
- Hoplocampa cookei (Clarke)
- Hoplocampa crataegi (Klug, 1816)
- Hoplocampa enslini Statz, 1936
- Hoplocampa flava (Linnaeus, 1760)
- Hoplocampa formosana Malaise, 1961
- Hoplocampa fulvicornis (Panzer, 1801)
- Hoplocampa halcyon
- Hoplocampa ilicis Cockerell, 1927
- Hoplocampa lacteipennis
- Hoplocampa minuta (Christ, 1791)
- Hoplocampa pallipes
- Hoplocampa pectoralis Thomson, 1871
- Hoplocampa phantoma Zinovjev, 1993
- Hoplocampa tadshikistanica Muche, 1986
- Hoplocampa sinobirmana
- Hoplocampa tadshikistanica Muche, 1986
- Hoplocampa testudinea (Klug, 1816)

== Description ==
The female usually lays its eggs on flowers.

The larvae feed on young fruit.

Reproduction is usually parthenogenetic. Hoplocampa flava is very common.
