= Caliroa dionae =

Scientific classification
- Domain: Eukaryota
- Kingdom: Animalia
- Phylum: Arthropoda
- Class: Insecta
- Order: Hymenoptera
- Suborder: Symphyta
- Family: Tenthredinidae
- Genus: Caliroa
- Species: C. dionae

Binomial name
- Caliroa dionae Smith and Moissan-De Serres 2017

Species of sawfly

Caliroa dionae is a sawfly whose larvae eat the leaves of the blueberry plant. It was first discovered near Trois-Rivieres, Quebec.

It is the first Caliroa in North America found to eat blueberry plants.
