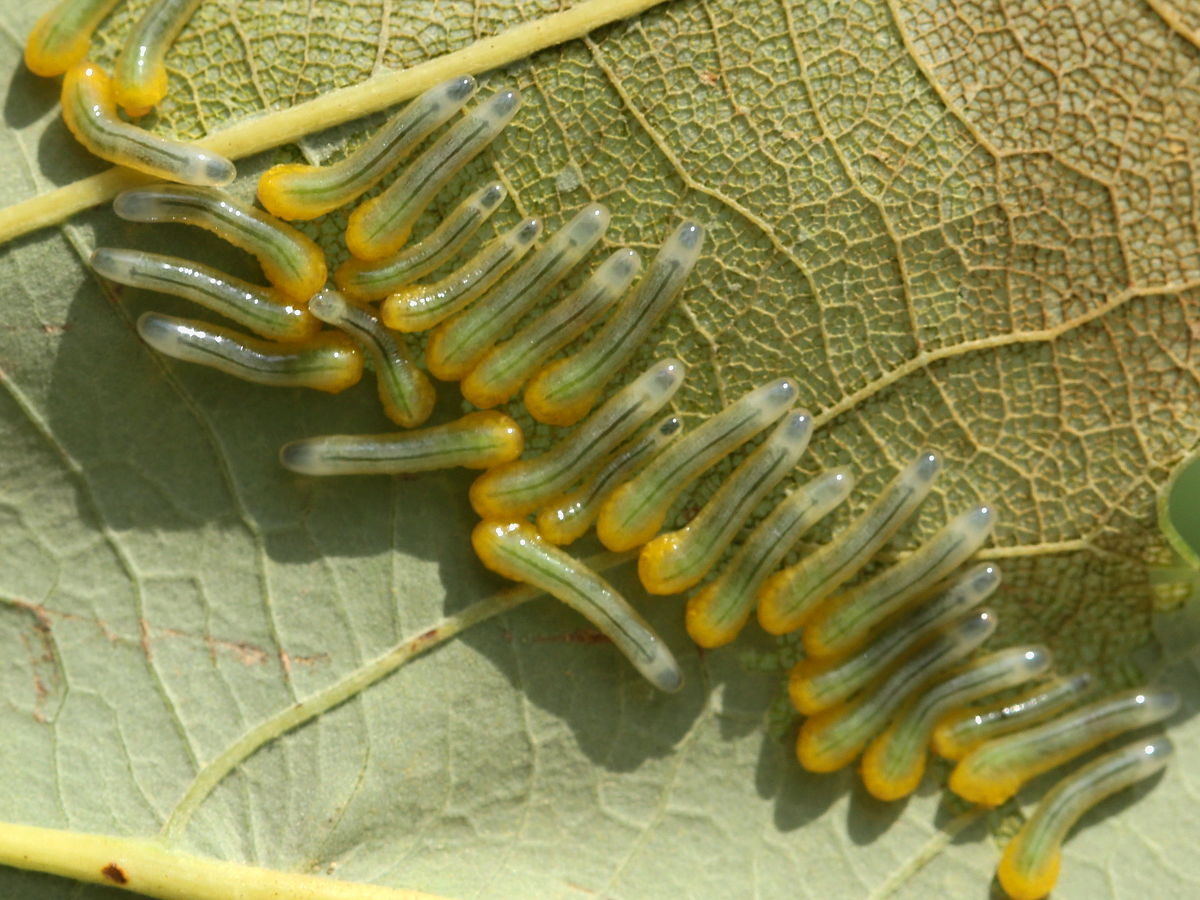
- larvae

Scientific classification
- Kingdom: Animalia
- Phylum: Arthropoda
- Clade: Pancrustacea
- Class: Insecta
- Order: Hymenoptera
- Suborder: Symphyta
- Family: Tenthredinidae
- Genus: Caliroa
- Species: C. quercuscoccineae

Binomial name
- Caliroa quercuscoccineae (Dyar)

= Caliroa quercuscoccineae =

Species of sawfly

Caliroa quercuscoccineae, the scarlet oak sawfly or slug oak sawfly, is a species of sawfly in the family Tenthredinidae.

== Ecology ==
Larvae feed on a wide range of oaks, including pin, black, red, and white oaks, as well as its namesake scarlet oak.

== Range ==
This sawfly is a pest of oaks, and has been reported from Massachusetts through North Carolina, Kentucky, Tennessee, and Georgia.
