= Caliroa cinxia =

Scientific classification
- Domain: Eukaryota
- Kingdom: Animalia
- Phylum: Arthropoda
- Class: Insecta
- Order: Hymenoptera
- Suborder: Symphyta
- Family: Tenthredinidae
- Genus: Caliroa
- Species: C. cinxia

Binomial name
- Caliroa cinxia (Klug, 1816)

Species of sawfly

Caliroa cinxia is a species of insect belonging to the family Tenthredinidae.

It is native to Europe.

Synonym:

- Tenthredo cinxia Klug, 1816
