= Lathrolestes =

Scientific classification
- Kingdom: Animalia
- Phylum: Arthropoda
- Class: Insecta
- Order: Hymenoptera
- Family: Ichneumonidae
- Subfamily: Ctenopelmatinae
- Tribe: Perilissini
- Genus: Lathrolestes; Förster, 1869

Genus of wasps

Lathrolestes is a genus of parasitoid wasps in the family Ichneumonidae and the tribe Perilissini.

== Species ==
The Catalogue of Life lists the following:

- Lathrolestes albicinctus
- Lathrolestes aquilus
- Lathrolestes asperatus
- Lathrolestes bipunctatus
- Lathrolestes breviremus
- Lathrolestes buccinator
- Lathrolestes bulbus
- Lathrolestes bullatus
- Lathrolestes carinatus
- Lathrolestes caudatus
- Lathrolestes citreus
- Lathrolestes citrofrontalis
- Lathrolestes clavipes
- Lathrolestes clypeatus
- Lathrolestes constrictus
- Lathrolestes convexus
- Lathrolestes dentatus
- Lathrolestes ensator
- Lathrolestes erugatus
- Lathrolestes euryremus
- Lathrolestes fiedleri
- Lathrolestes frontator
- Lathrolestes gauldi
- Lathrolestes gibbosus
- Lathrolestes haroldi
- Lathrolestes irenea
- Lathrolestes jennyae
- Lathrolestes karenae
- Lathrolestes kulingensis
- Lathrolestes lucidulus
- Lathrolestes luteolator
- Lathrolestes luteolus
- Lathrolestes macropygus
- Lathrolestes meridionalis
- Lathrolestes messae
- Lathrolestes minimus
- Lathrolestes mnemonicae
- Lathrolestes morator
- Lathrolestes moravicus
- Lathrolestes nasoni
- Lathrolestes nigircollis
- Lathrolestes nigricollis
- Lathrolestes nigrifacies
- Lathrolestes obscurellus
- Lathrolestes occultor
- Lathrolestes ochraceus
- Lathrolestes orbitalis
- Lathrolestes periclistae
- Lathrolestes pictilis
- Lathrolestes pictus
- Lathrolestes planus
- Lathrolestes platynus
- Lathrolestes pleuralis
- Lathrolestes profenusae
- Lathrolestes protenus
- Lathrolestes protrusus
- Lathrolestes redimiculus
- Lathrolestes ruwenzoricus
- Lathrolestes saliceti
- Lathrolestes sexmaculatus
- Lathrolestes soleatus
- Lathrolestes striatus
- Lathrolestes taebaeksanensis
- Lathrolestes tomostethi
- Lathrolestes truncatus
- Lathrolestes ungularis
- Lathrolestes ungnyeo
- Lathrolestes verticalis
- Lathrolestes zeugophorae
