= Lathrolestes ensator =

Scientific classification
- Kingdom: Animalia
- Phylum: Arthropoda
- Clade: Pancrustacea
- Class: Insecta
- Order: Hymenoptera
- Family: Ichneumonidae
- Genus: Lathrolestes
- Species: L. ensator

Binomial name
- Lathrolestes ensator (Brauns, 1898)

Species of wasp

Lathrolestes ensator is a species of wasp in the family Ichneumonidae. it is a parasitoid of the apple sawfly Hoplocampa testudinea. Both insects are native to Europe, but the sawfly has been accidentally introduced into North America where it has become established. The larvae of the sawfly tunnel into developing apple fruitlets which later fall to the ground, where the larvae continue their development. The wasp parasitises the larvae and has been released in North America as part of a biological control programme for the sawfly.

== Ecology ==
In a research study in the Netherlands, L. ensator was the only parasitoid of the apple sawfly larvae that was found, and the sawfly was the only host used by it. The wasp preferentially chose second instar larvae in which to lay eggs, and the spring emergence of the adult wasp usually synchronised with this stage of the host's life cycle. The female wasp produced around 150 eggs but did not actually oviposit as many as half of these.

== Use in biological control ==
In Europe, the apple sawfly is part of the food web, but when it was accidentally introduced into North America, there were no natural enemies to control it and it caused much damage to the apple crop. In a classical biological control programme. L. ensator was released into Quebec between 1994 and 2001 and became established in the Frelighsburg area. Further work was undertaken between 2002 and 2015 to spread the parasite throughout eastern North America. This was done by collecting fallen fruitlets of apple trees in infected orchards in the Frelighsburg area, and scattering them in orchards in other parts of Quebec, Ontario, Nova Scotia and New Hampshire. As a result of this introduction, the wasp became established in three other parts of Quebec and in Hilton in Ontario.
