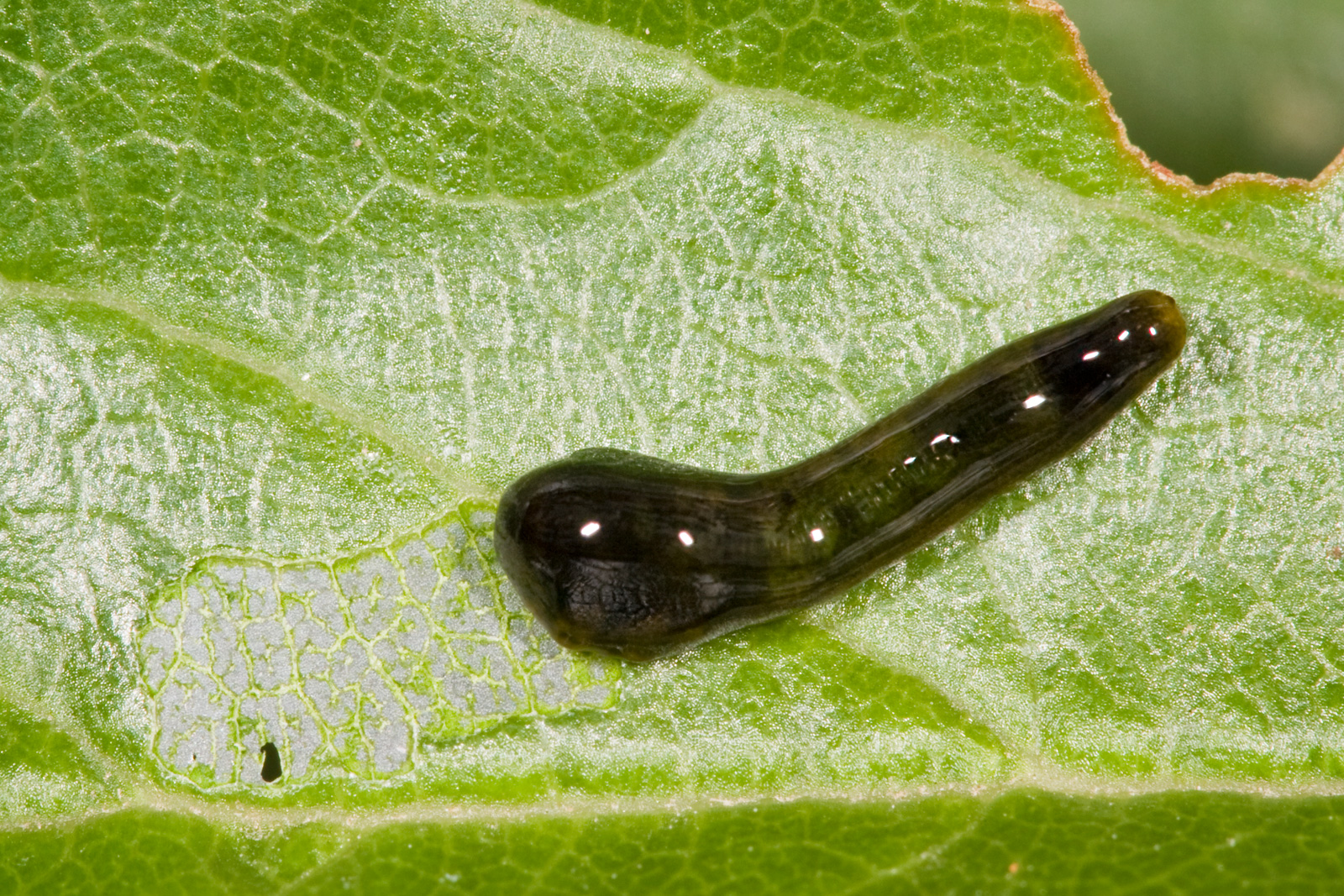
- Larva of Caliroa cerasi

Scientific classification
- Kingdom: Animalia
- Phylum: Arthropoda
- Class: Insecta
- Order: Hymenoptera
- Suborder: Symphyta
- Family: Tenthredinidae
- Subfamily: Heterarthrinae
- Genus: Caliroa; Costa, 1859

Species
- Caliroa annulipes (Klug); Caliroa cerasi (Linnaeus, 1758); Caliroa cinxia (Klug); Caliroa cothurnata (Serville); Caliroa crypta Heidemaa; Caliroa dionae Smith and Moissan-De Serres; Caliroa distincta Smith; Caliroa fasciata (Norton); Caliroa floridana Smith; Caliroa hyalina Smith; Caliroa labrata MacGillivray; Caliroa liturata MacGillivray; Caliroa lobata MacGillivray; Caliroa lorata MacGillivray; Caliroa lunata MacGillivray; Caliroa nyssae Smith; Caliroa obsoleta (Norton); Caliroa petiolata Smith; Caliroa quercuscoccineae (Dyar); Caliroa tremulae Chevin; Caliroa varipes (Klug)

= Caliroa =

Genus of sawflies

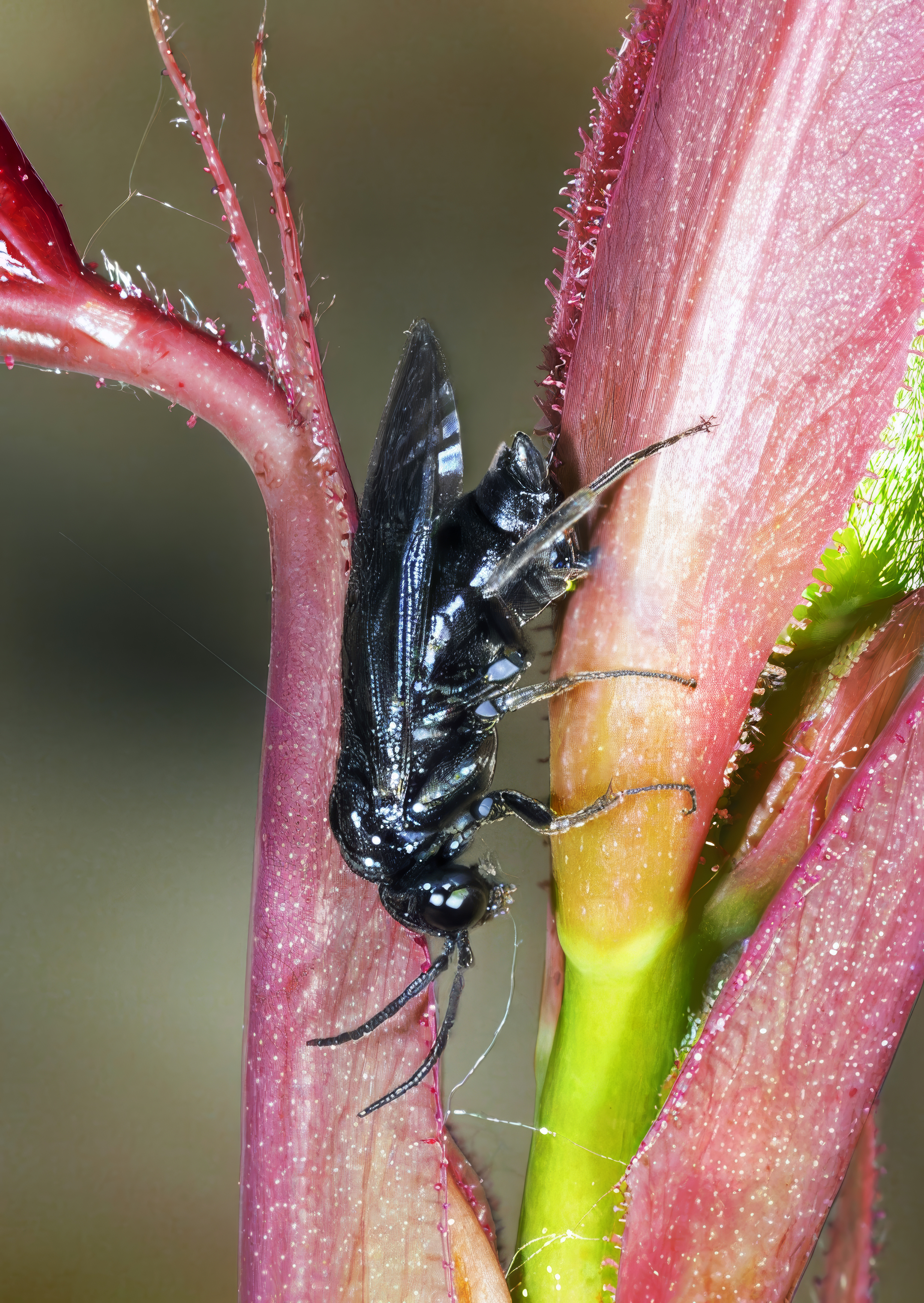
Caliroa cerasi imago

Caliroa is a genus of sawflies in the family Tenthredinidae. The larvae are slimy in appearance, and are sometimes referred to as "slugs" (e.g., the "pear slug") although they are insects rather than gastropods.

The larvae of some species in this genus are important pests which can do significant damage to the leaves of trees such as oaks, poplars, and cherry and pear trees. The larvae are covered in slime, making them unpalatable to predators; when fully grown, they drop off the tree and pupate underground.
