= Caliroa annulipes =

Scientific classification
- Kingdom: Animalia
- Phylum: Arthropoda
- Clade: Pancrustacea
- Class: Insecta
- Order: Hymenoptera
- Suborder: Symphyta
- Family: Tenthredinidae
- Genus: Caliroa
- Species: C. annulipes

Binomial name
- Caliroa annulipes (Klug, 1816)

Species of insect

Caliroa annulipes is a species of insect. Its common name is the oak slug sawfly.

== Description ==
All Caliroa larvae are coated with a translucent mucus membrane, which is seen as slug-like. The larva body color depends largely on the color of the content of their guts.

They have a bivoltine flight period, May and August.

Adults are small, 4-6 mm long, black-bodied, with white markings on the legs. They are short lived.

== Range ==
They are recorded in Britain and Ireland.

== Habitat ==
They are found in habitat where its host trees and shrubs grow, including gardens, parks, and woodlands.

== Ecology ==
Caliroa annulipes is associated with oak, birch, willow, lime, beech, and bilberry species. Larvae feed by grazing the underside (epidermis) of leaves, skeletonizing them, for up to about 3 weeks.

Caliroa annulipes is classified as a species of least concern in Great Britain.

== Etymology ==
"Annulipes" derives from Latin annulus ("ring") + pes ("foot"), i.e. "ringed-footed," referring to the pale ring-like markings on the legs.
