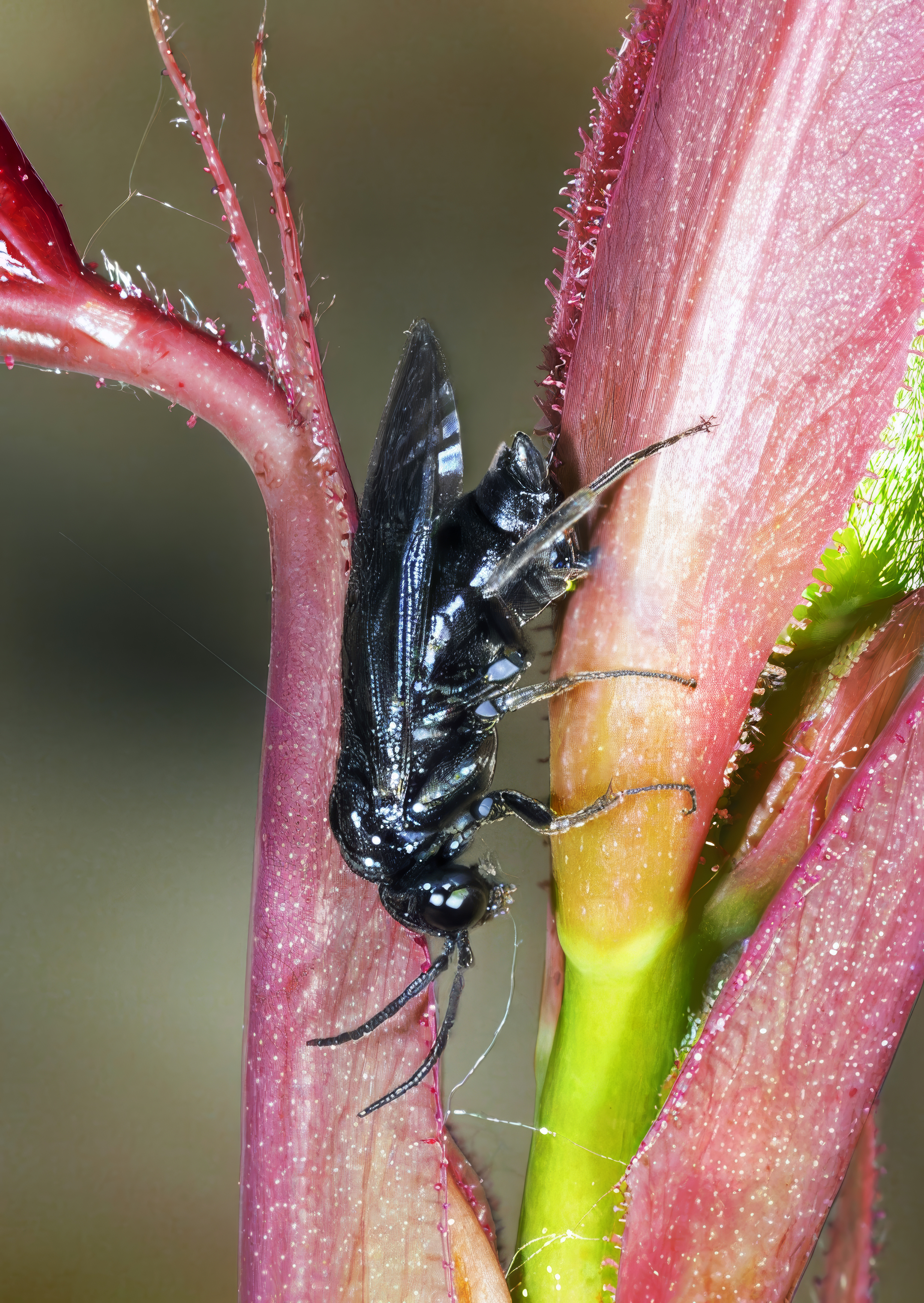

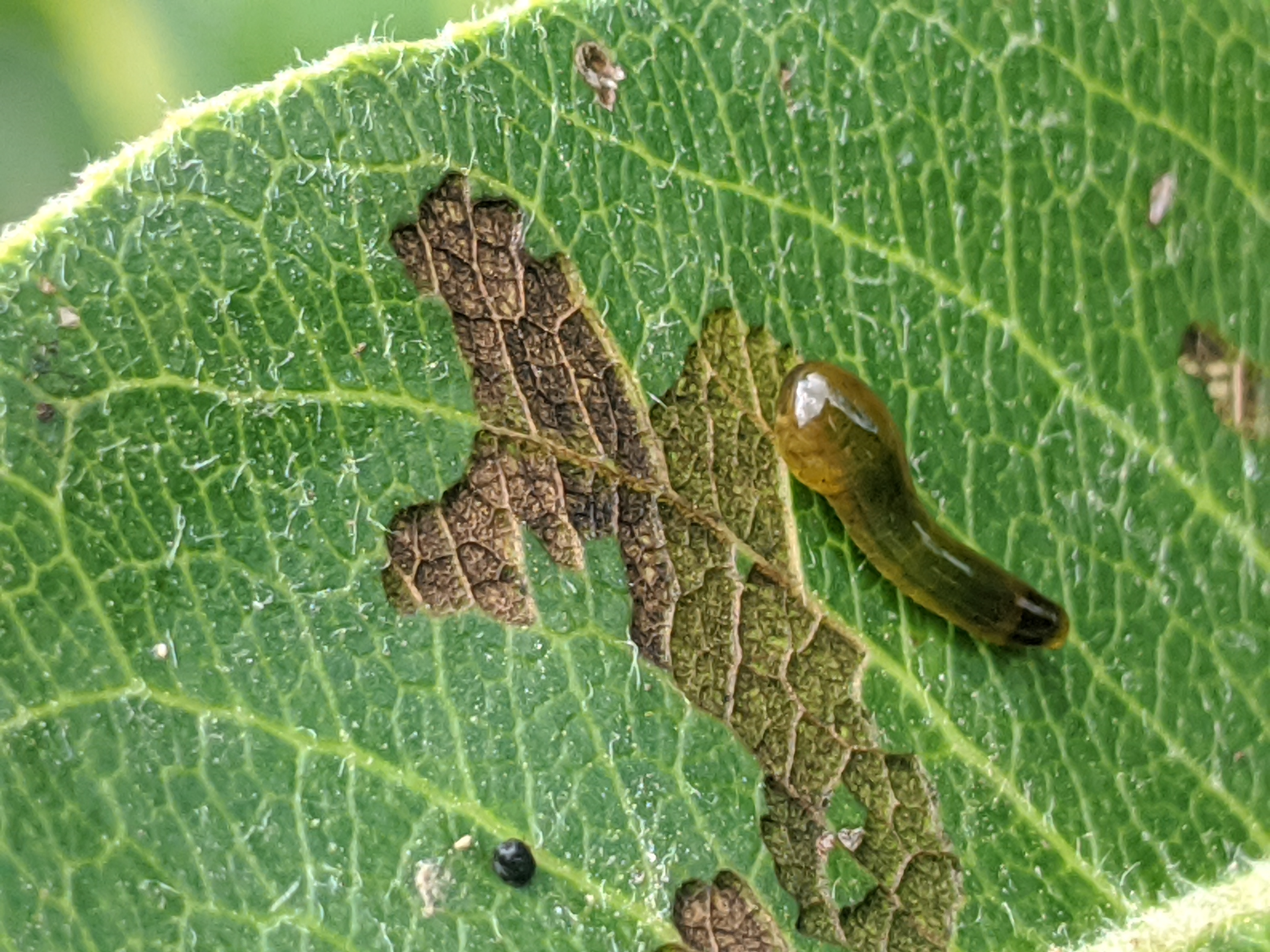
- Adult (top) and larva with leaf damage (bottom)

Scientific classification
- Kingdom: Animalia
- Phylum: Arthropoda
- Class: Insecta
- Order: Hymenoptera
- Suborder: Symphyta
- Family: Tenthredinidae
- Genus: Caliroa
- Species: C. cerasi

Binomial name
- Caliroa cerasi (Linnaeus, 1758)

= Pear slug =

Species of sawfly

Caliroa cerasi is a species of sawfly belonging to the family Tenthredinidae. The larva of this insect are commonly referred to as the pear slug or cherry slug and are a nearly worldwide agricultural pest. The species was first described by Carl Linnaeus in his landmark 1758 10th edition of Systema Naturae. The pear slug is an important pest that eats leaves of cherry, pear, plum and hawthorn trees, leaving behind a skeleton of veins. The larvae cover themselves in green slime, making themselves unpalatable to predators. They molt between five and eight times before being fully grown. When the larvae are fully grown, they drop from the tree to the ground and pupate underground. The adult sawfly emerges from the pupal case and climbs from the soil to mate and lays eggs on the leaves of the host plant, completing the life cycle.

Other sources dispute the notion that the females climb the tree to lay their eggs, claiming instead that they fly to the tree. This is an important detail in regard to their control in horticultural circumstances where glues are used to control climbing pests.

In New Zealand the biocontrol agent species Lathrolestes luteolator has been released on two separate occasions in an attempt to control this agricultural pest.

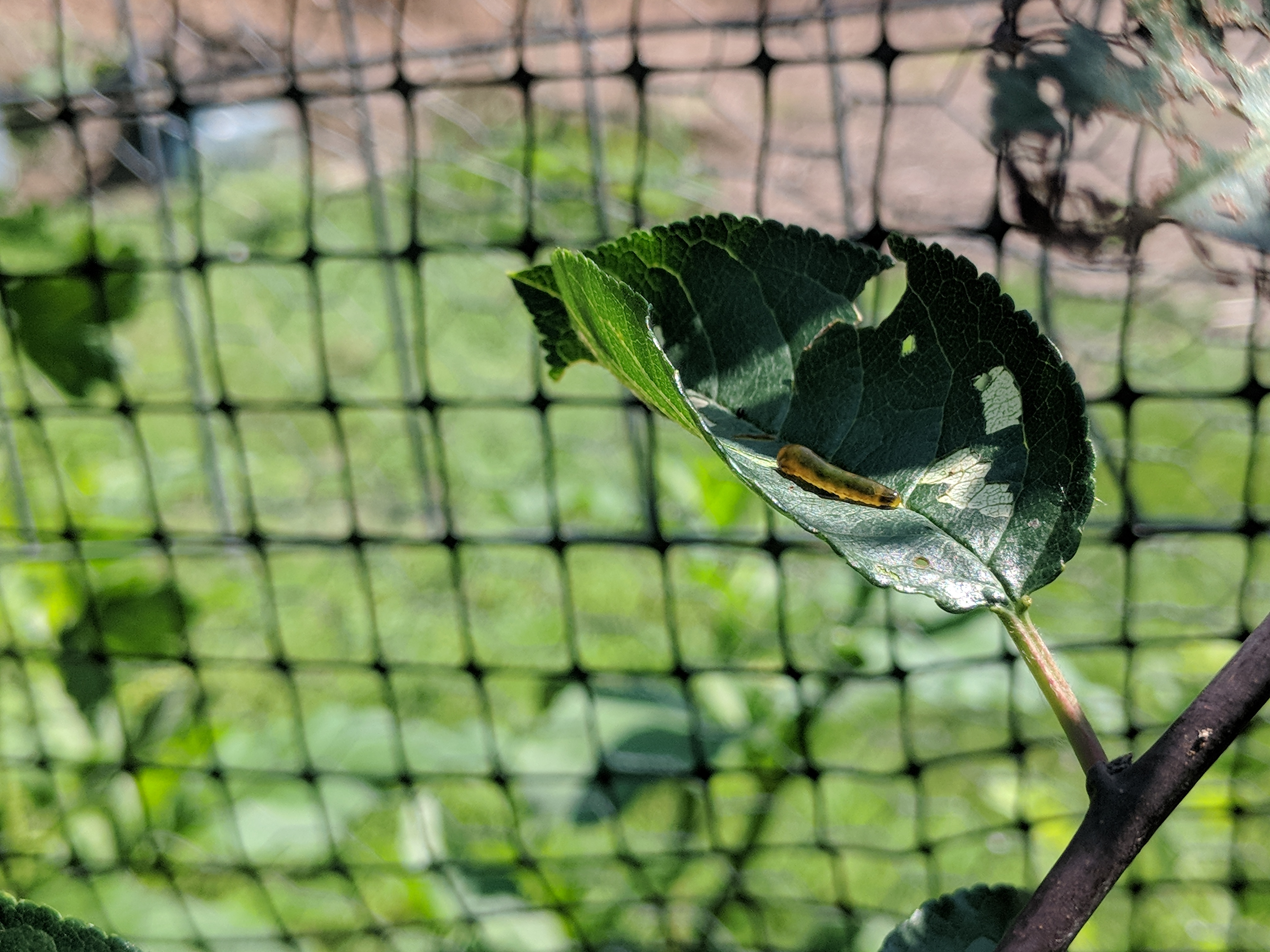
Pear slug larva on a plum tree

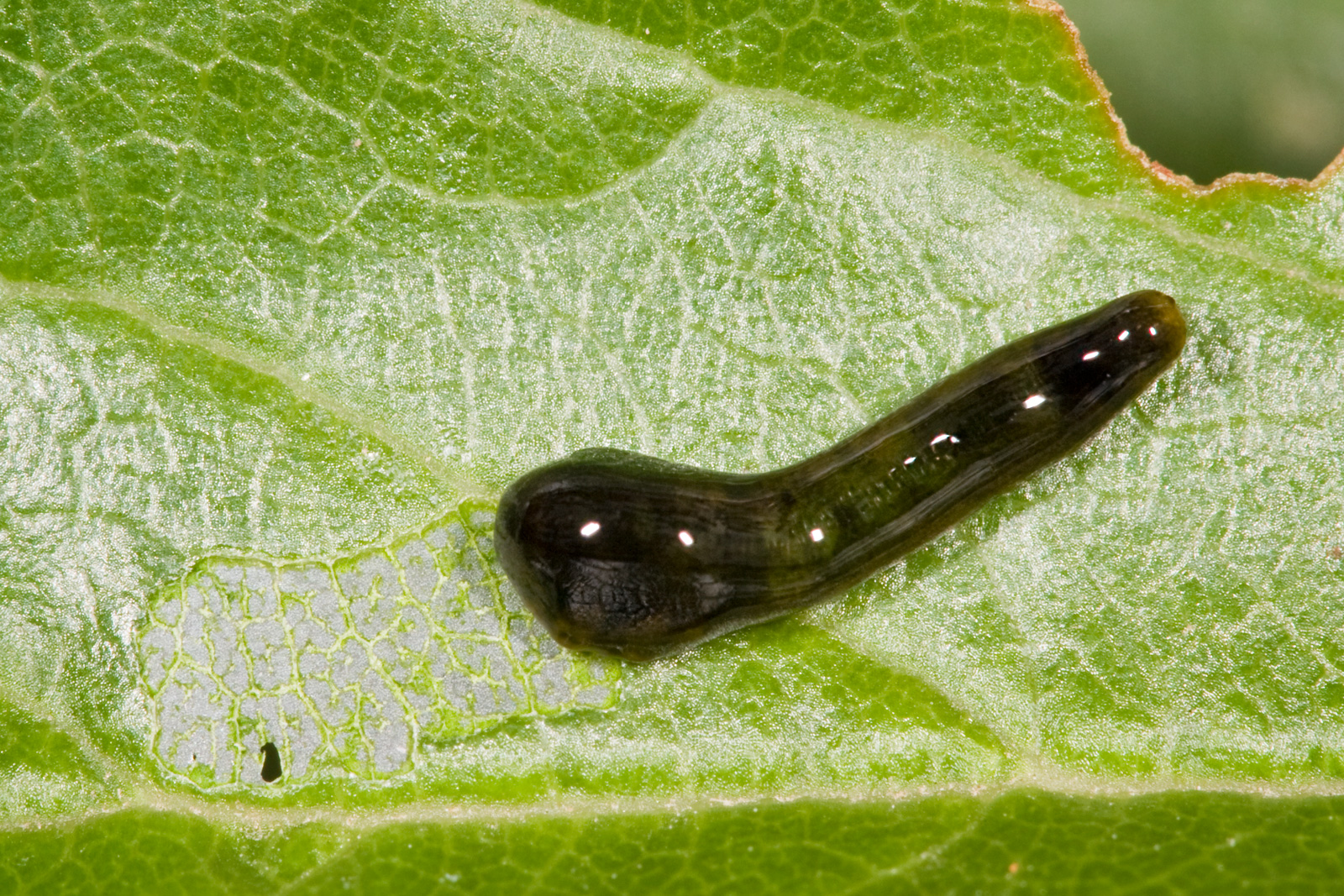
