= Lathrolestes luteolator =

Scientific classification
- Kingdom: Animalia
- Phylum: Arthropoda
- Clade: Pancrustacea
- Class: Insecta
- Order: Hymenoptera
- Family: Ichneumonidae
- Genus: Lathrolestes
- Species: L. luteolator

Binomial name
- Lathrolestes luteolator (Gravenhorst, 1829)

Synonyms
- L. caliroae (Rohwer, 1915); L. eriocampoides (Rohwer, 1915); L. gorskii (Ratzeburg, 1852); L. mentalis (Davis, 1897); L. nigriventris (Ashmead, 1902); L. scutellatus (Ashmead, 1890); L. suburbis (Davis, 1897)

Species of wasp

Lathrolestes luteolator is a species of wasp in the family Ichneumonidae. It is native to North America and is a parasitoid of various species of sawfly larvae. In the 1990s, it started to parasitise the larvae of the invasive amber-marked birch leaf miner in Alberta. When this pest spread to Alaska, the wasp was used in biological pest control.

== Ecology ==
Like other parasitic wasps in the family Ichneumonidae, the adult female L. luteolator uses its ovipositor to lay eggs inside the body of its prey, usually the larval stage of a sawfly larva, often a leaf miner. When the eggs hatch, the carnivorous larvae live in and consume the body of their host. Various sawfly larvae are attacked including the red oak leaf miner (Profenusa alumna). In Alberta, the host is the "pear slug" (Caliroa cerasi), which is not a mollusc but the larva of a sawfly.

However, in Alberta in the early 1990s, the wasp adopted a new host and started parasitising the amber-marked birch leaf miner (Profenusa thomsoni), an invasive species that had appeared in the province twenty years earlier and become a major pest of birch trees (Betula). A dramatic collapse in populations of the leaf miner followed, and numbers remain low, seemingly kept under control by the parasitic wasp.

By 2003 the range of the amber-marked birch leaf miner had extended into Alaska, and it was spreading, first throughout the Anchorage Basin, and later into the Eagle River watershed and the Matanuska-Susitna Valley and southwards to Bird Ridge, causing serious defoliation of birch trees. A biological control program of the pest using Lathrolestes luteolator was initiated in 2004.
