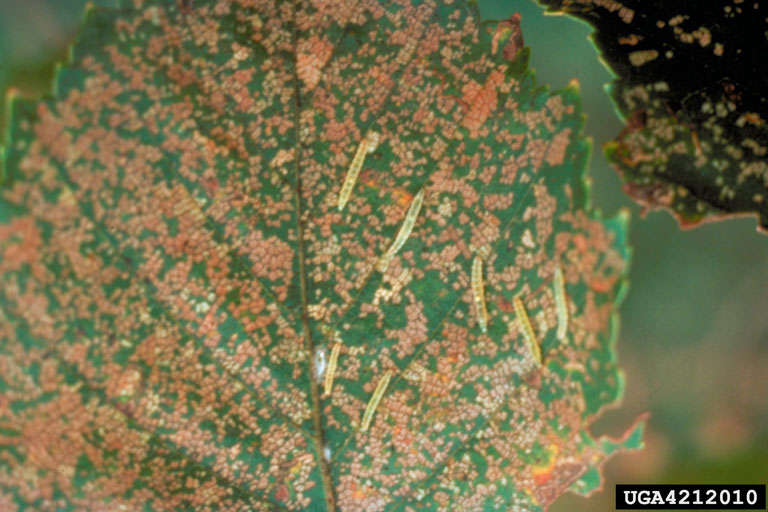

Scientific classification
- Kingdom: Animalia
- Phylum: Arthropoda
- Clade: Pancrustacea
- Class: Insecta
- Order: Lepidoptera
- Family: Bucculatricidae
- Genus: Bucculatrix
- Species: B. canadensisella

Binomial name
- Bucculatrix canadensisella Chambers, 1875

= Bucculatrix canadensisella =

Species of moth

Bucculatrix canadensisella, the birch skeletonizer, is a moth of the family Bucculatricidae. The species was first described by Vactor Tousey Chambers in 1875. It is found in North America. In Canada, it has been recorded from New Brunswick to British Columbia, Nova Scotia and Prince Edward Island. In the United States, it has been recorded from New York, New Jersey, Michigan, Wisconsin, Minnesota, Pennsylvania, North Carolina, Tennessee, Kentucky and Colorado.

The wingspan is 7–8.5 mm. Adults have been recorded on wing from April to September. Adults are on wing between June and July depending on the location.

The larvae feed on Betula species, including Betula nigra, Betula lutea and Betula occidentalis. They mine the leaves of their host plant.
