= Fenusa dohrnii =

Scientific classification
- Domain: Eukaryota
- Kingdom: Animalia
- Phylum: Arthropoda
- Class: Insecta
- Order: Hymenoptera
- Suborder: Symphyta
- Family: Tenthredinidae
- Genus: Fenusa
- Species: F. dohrnii

Binomial name
- Fenusa dohrnii (Tischbein)

Species of sawfly

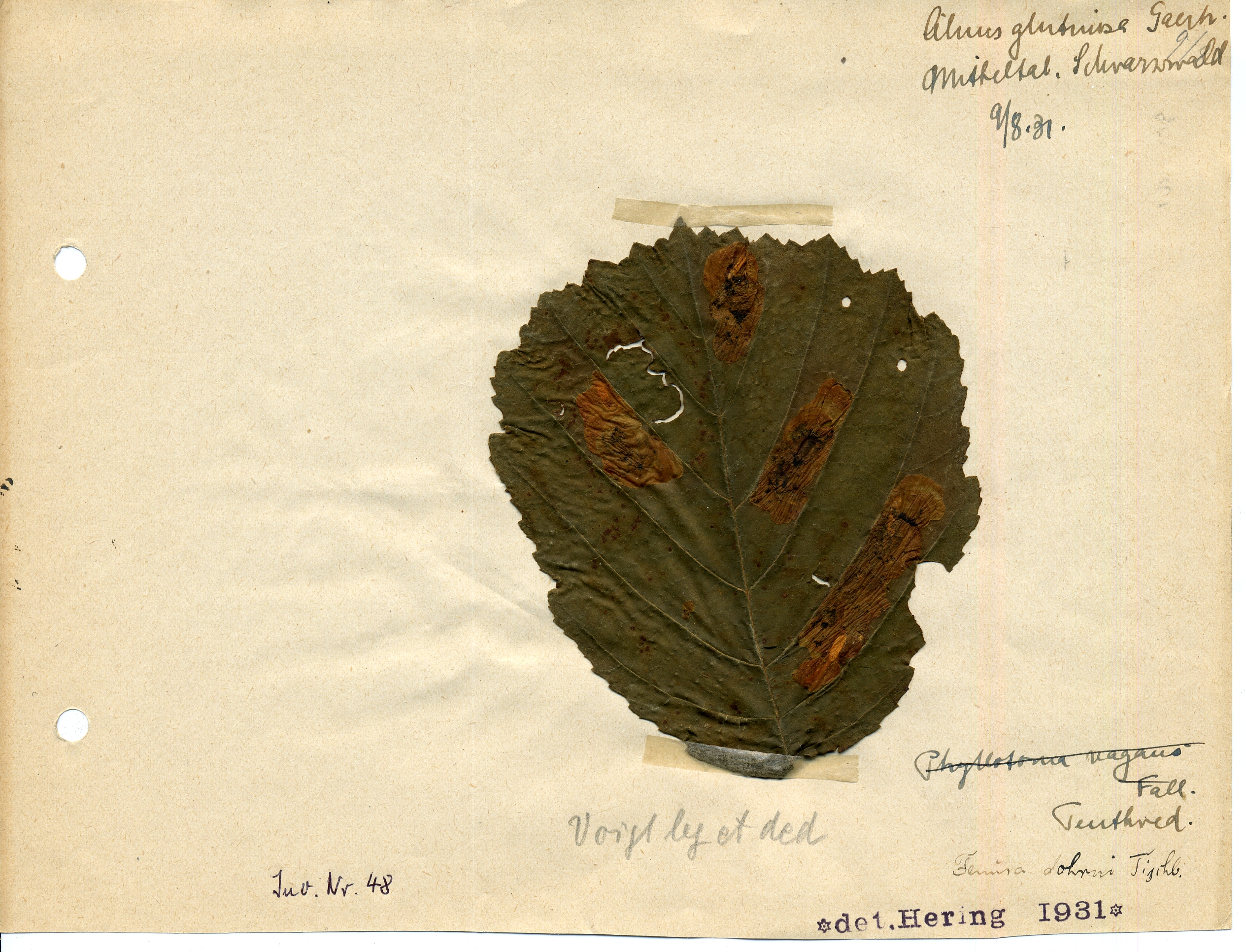
Leaf mine of Fenusa dohrnii

Fenusa dohrnii, the European alder leafminer, is a species of common sawfly in the family Tenthredinidae. It is found in Europe.
