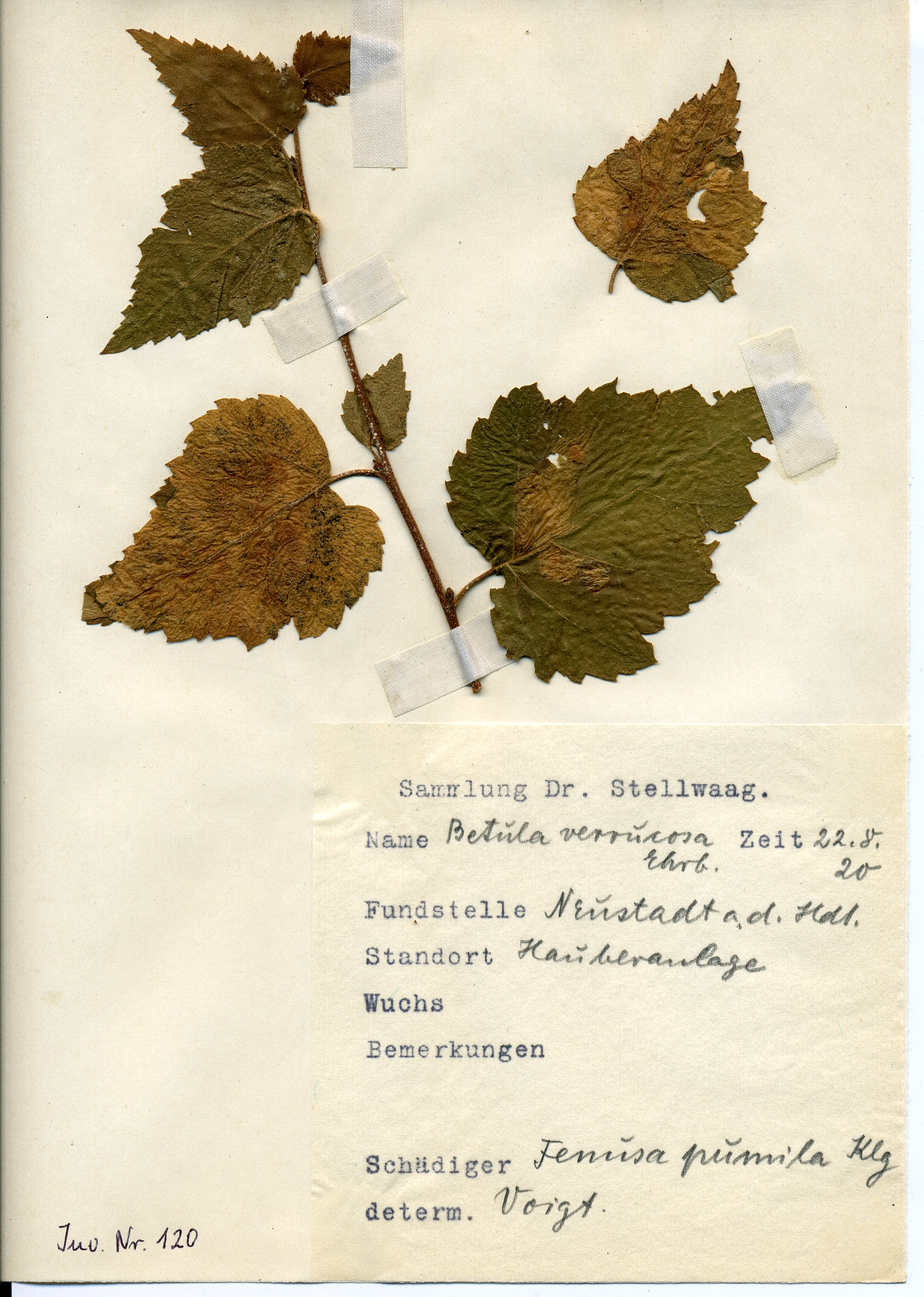
- Fenusa pumila leafmines Museum Wiesbaden

Scientific classification
- Kingdom: Animalia
- Phylum: Arthropoda
- Class: Insecta
- Order: Hymenoptera
- Suborder: Symphyta
- Family: Tenthredinidae
- Genus: Fenusa
- Species: F. pumila

Binomial name
- Fenusa pumila Leach, 1817

Synonyms
- Tenthredo pumila Klug, 1818; Fenusa pusilla Auctt. (not Lepeletier); Fenusa fuliginosa Healy, 1869; Fenusa minima Brischke, 1883

= Fenusa pumila =

Species of sawfly

Fenusa pumila, the birch leafminer, is a species of sawfly in the family Tenthredinidae. It is found in Europe and has been introduced into North America. In North America it may have two to four generations per year and the average first occurrence of adults is after 65 growing degree-days.
