= Fungal isolate =

Compound isolated from fungi for medicinal benefit

Fungal isolates have been researched for decades. Because fungi often exist in thin mycelial monolayers, with no protective shell, immune system, and limited mobility, they have developed the ability to synthesize a variety of unusual compounds for survival. Researchers have discovered fungal isolates with anticancer, antimicrobial, immunomodulatory, and other bio-active properties. The first statins, β-Lactam antibiotics, as well as a few important antifungals, were discovered in fungi.

== Chemotherapeutic isolates ==
BMS manufactures paclitaxel using Penicillium and plant cell fermentation. Fungi can synthesize podophyllotoxin and camptothecin, precursors to etoposide, teniposide, topotecan, and irinotecan.

Lentinan, PSK, and PSP, are registered anticancer immunologic adjuvants. Irofulven and acylfulvene are anticancer derivatives of illudin S. Clavaric acid is a reversible farnesyltransferase inhibitor. Inonotus obliquus creates betulinic acid precursor betulin. Flammulina velutipes creates asparaginase. Plinabulin is a fungal isolate derivative currently being researched for anticancer applications.

== Cholesterol inhibitors ==
The statins lovastatin, mevastatin, and simvastatin precursor monacolin J, are fungal isolates. Additional fungal isolates that inhibit cholesterol are zaragozic acids, eritadenine, and nicotinamide riboside.

== Immunosuppressants ==
Ciclosporin, mycophenolic acid, mizoribine, FR901483, and gliotoxin, are immunosuppressant fungal isolates.

== Antimicrobials ==
Penicillin, cephalosporins, fusafungine, usnic acid, fusidic acid, fumagillin, brefeldin A, verrucarin A, alamethicin, are antibiotic fungal isolates. Antibiotics retapamulin, tiamulin, and valnemulin are derivatives of the fungal isolate pleuromutilin. Griseofulvin, echinocandins, strobilurin, azoxystrobin, caspofungin, micafungin, are fungal isolates with antifungal activity.

== Psychotropic isolates ==
The headache medications cafergot, dihydroergotamine, methysergide, methylergometrine, the dementia medications hydergine, nicergoline, the Parkinson's disease medications lisuride, bromocriptine, cabergoline, and pergolide were all derived from Claviceps isolates. Polyozellus multiplex synthesizes prolyl endopeptidase inhibitors polyozellin, thelephoric acid, and kynapcins. Boletus badius synthesizes L-theanine.

== Other isolates ==

Researchers have discovered other interesting fungal isolates like the antihyperglycemic compounds ternatin, aspergillusol A, sclerotiorin, and antimalarial compounds codinaeopsin, efrapeptins, and antiamoebin. The fungal isolate ergothioneine is actively absorbed and concentrated by the human body via SLC22A4. Other notable fungal isolates include vitamin D_{1}, vitamin D_{2}, and vitamin D_{4}.

Isolate	Source	Researched activity / Chemical description
9-Deacetoxyfumigaclavine C	endophytic Aspergillus fumigatus	potent, selective, anticancer activity comparable to doxorubicin (IC_{50} = 3.1 μM against K562)
14-Norpseurotin A	Aspergillus	antiparasitic/anticancer
3-O-Methylfunicone	Penicillium pinophilum	in vitro cancer stem cell inhibitor
Anicequol	Penicillium aurantiogriseum	in vitro anchorage-independent cancer inhibitor
Anomalin A	sponge-derived Arthrinium	angiogenesis inhibitor
Antiamoebin	Emericellopsis	anti-microbial/protozoan polypeptide
Arugosin C	Aspergillus versicolor isolated from Red Sea green alga	bio-active anthraquinone
Aspergillides A-C	marine Aspergillus ostianus	anticancer/cytotoxic
Aspergillusene	"sea fan"-derived Aspergillus sydowii	antioxidant sesquiterpene
Aspergilone A	"sea fan"-derived Aspergillus	anticancer and antifouling activity
Aspergillusol A	marine Aspergillus	alpha-glucosidase inhibitor
Asperterrestide A	marine Aspergillus terreus	cytotoxic and antiviral cyclic tetrapeptide
Asterric acid	Antarctic Geomyces	endothelin binding inhibitor
Auranthine	Penicillium	antimicrobial
Aurantiamine	Penicillium aurantiogriseum	valine and histidine derived diketopiperazine
Aurantiomide	sponge-derived Penicillium aurantiogriseum	quinazoline alkaloid with cytotoxic/anticancer activity
Berkeleydione	fungal extremophile (Berkeley Pit, Montana)	anticancer polyketide-terpenoid
Berkeleytrione	fungal extremophile (Berkeley Pit, Montana)	anticancer polyketide-terpenoid
Berkelic acid	fungal extremophile (Berkeley Pit, Montana)	spiroketal anticancer compound
beta-Ergocryptine	ergot	dopaminergic ergot alkaloid
Bisvertinolone	Trichoderma	anticancer
Botryodiplodin	Penicillium	antibiotic mycotoxin
Botryosphaeran	Botryosphaeria rhodina	free-radical scavenging and antioxidant
Brevianamide S	marine Aspergillus versicolor	antimicrobial dimeric diketopiperazine
Brevicompanines D-H	deep ocean sediment Penicillium	lipopolysaccharide (LPS)-induced nitric oxide inhibitor
Cephalosporolide	marine Penicillium	novel lactones
Chaetoglobosin A	Chaetomium	anticancer
Chaetoxanthone	marine-derived Chaetomium	bio-active xanthone
Chanoclavine	ergot	dopamine agonist
Chanoclavine II	ergot	
Chetracins B	Antarctic psychrophilic Oidiodendron truncatum	in vitro anticancer (nanomolar)
Chrysophanic acid		antiviral/anticancer anthraquinone
Chrysosporide	Sepedonium chrysospermum	
Citreorosein	Penicillium	antimicrobial polyketide
Citrinolactone D	marine-derived Penicillium	citrinin derivative
Citromycetin	Australian Penicillium	bio-active polyketide
Citromycin	Penicillium	antibiotic
Communesin B	Mediterranean Axinella-derived Penicillium	anticancer
Costaclavin	ergot	
Cryptoechinuline D	mangrove rhizosphere soil-derived Aspergillus	anticancer
Curvularin	Penicillium	antimicrobial
Cycloprop-2-ene carboxylic acid	Russula subnigricans	causes rhabdomyolysis
Decumbenone C	marine Aspergillus sulphureus	anticancer
Dehydroaltenusin	Alternaria tenuis	inhibitor of mammalian DNA polymerase α
Dehydrocurvularin	Penicillium	antimicrobial
Disydonols A-C	marine Aspergillus	anticancer
Duclauxin	Penicillium duclauxi	anticancer
Epicoccins	Cordyceps-colonizing Epicoccum nigrum	antiviral
Epolactaene	marine fungus	antiinflammatory, inhibitory activity of DNA polymerases and DNA topoisomerase II, active synthetic analogs
Epoxyagroclavine	permafrost Penicillium	ergot alkaloid
Epoxyphomalins A-B	marine Paraconiothyrium	potent cytotoxics
Ergosine	ergot	dopaminergic ergot alkaloid
Ergostane	mushrooms	steroid
Ergostine	ergot	alpha-adrenergic blocking, vasoconstrictive ergot alkaloid
Eupenifeldin	Eupenicillium brefeldianum	antimicrobial cytotoxic bistropolone
Evariquinone	Emericella variecolor (derived from the marine sponge Haliclona)	
Fecosterol	fungi and lichens	steroid
Fellutanine	Penicillium	bio-active diketopiperazine alkaloids
Festuclavine	Aspergillus fumigatus	bio-active ergoline
Fumigaclavine A	endophytic Aspergillus	bio-active ergoline
Fumigaclavine B	endophytic Aspergillus	bio-active ergoline
Fumigaclavine C	endophytic Aspergillus	bio-active ergoline
Fumiquinazoline	soft coral Sinularia-derived Aspergillus fumigatus	cytotoxic/anticancer
Fungisterol	Cordyceps sinensis	steroid
Glionitrin A	mine-dwelling Aspergillus fumigatus	antibiotic-anticancer
Glionitrin B	Aspergillus fumigatus KMC-901	anticancer diketopiperazine
Hymenosetin	Hymenoscyphus pseudoalbidus	antimicrobial (active against MRSA)
Integrasone	Unknown	inhibits HIV-1 integrase enzyme
Isoemericellin	marine Emericella variecolor	
Leporizines A-C	Aspergillus	cytotoxic epithiodiketopiperazines
Leptosphaerin	marine Leptosphaeria oraemaris	antifungal
Lichesterol	fungi and lichens	steroid
Luteoalbusins A-B	deep sea Acrostalagmus luteoalbus	anticancer indole diketopiperazines
Luteusin A	Talaromyces luteus	monoamine oxidase inhibitor
Malettinin	Hypoxylon	polyketide/antimicrobial
Maximiscin	Tolypocladium (Salcha, Alaska)	anticancer polyketide-shikimate compound
Meleagrin	deep ocean Penicillium	anticancer
Methylenolactocin	Penicillium	anticancer
Neoxaline	Aspergillus japonicus	antimitotic and antiplatelet
Nigerapyrones A-E	marine mangrove-derived, endophytic Aspergillus niger	anticancer
Nigrosporin B	Nigrospora	antimicrobial
Nocapyrones E-G	Nocardiopsis dassonvillei	antimicrobial alpha-pyrones
Notoamide	marine Aspergillus	bio-active prenylated indole alkaloid
Oxaline	Penicillium oxalicum and Aspergillus japonicus	anticancer (tubulin polymerization inhibitor), O-methylated derivative of meleagrin
Pencolide	seaweed-derived endophytic fungi	bio-active maleimide
Penicitrinol J	marine-derived Penicillium	bio-active citrinin dimer
Penicitrinol K	marine-derived Penicillium	bio-active citrinin derivative
Penicitrinone E	marine-derived Penicillium	bio-active citrinin dimer
Penochalasin A	endophytic Chaetomium	cytotoxic/anticancer cytochalasan-based alkaloid
Penostatin A	Penicillium	cytotoxic metabolite
Pestalamides A-C	Pestalotiopsis theae	antiviral and antifungal
Petrosifungin	sponge-derived Penicillium brevicompactum	novel cyclodepsipeptide
Phillyrin	endophytic fungus (isolated from Forsythia)	antiobesity
Piscarinine	Penicillium piscarium westling	bio-active polycyclic diketopiperazine alkaloid
Prenylterphenyllins	marine Aspergillus candidus	anticancer
Protuboxepins A and B	Aspergillus SF-5044	anticancer diketopiperazines
Pseurotin A	endophytic Aspergillus	antiparasitic and anticancer
Pyrenocine	marine Penicillium paxilli	antibiotic/antiinflammatory mycotoxin
Questiomycin A	Penicillium expansum	antibiotic
Quinocitrinine	permafrost Penicillium	quinoline alkaloid
RES-1149-2	Aspergillus	non-peptidic endothelin receptor antagonist
Retigeric acid B	Lobaria (lichen)	anticancer
Rubratoxin B	Penicillium rubrum	anticancer
Rugulovasine	Penicillium	
Sch 642305	Penicillium verrucosum and Rhizoctonia solani	bacterial DNA primase inhibitor
Sclerotides A-B	Aspergillus sclerotiorum PT06-1	bio-active cyclic hexapeptides
Secalonic acid	marine fungi	nootropic
Shamixanthone	Aspergillus	bio-active prenylated xanthone
Shearinine	marine Penicillium janthinellum	anticancer
Siderin	Aspergillus versicolor isolated from Red Sea green alga	bio-active anthraquinone
Sorbicillactone A	sponge-derived fungus	novel bio-active alkaloid
Spiculisporic acid	marine Aspergillus	bioactive γ-butenolide
Spiropreussione	Preussia	anticancer
Stephacidin	Aspergillus ochraceus WC76466	anticancer/cytotoxic
Stromemycin	marine Emericella	C-glycosidic depside matrix metalloproteinase inhibitor
Terpestacin	endophytic fungus Drechslera ravenelii	anticancer
Terrestrols	marine Penicillium terrestre	cytotoxic/anticancer
Terreulactone A	Aspergillus terreus	anti-acetylcholinesterase terpenoid
Topopyrone C	Phoma and Penicillium	anticancer human topoisomerase I inhibitor
Trachyspic acid	Talaromyces trachyspermus	heparanase inhibitor
Trichodimerol	Trichoderma	bio-active pentacycle
Ustusolates	marine Aspergillus ustus	anticancer
Variecolactone	Emericella purpurea mycelium	immunomodulatory sesterterpene
Variecolol	Emericella aurantio-brunnea	immunosuppressant/antiviral alkaloid
Varixanthone	marine Emericella variecolor	antimicrobial
Vermiculine	Penicillium vermiculatum	antibiotic
Vermistatin	fungal extremophile (Berkeley Pit, Montana)	anticancer
Vermixocin	Penicillium vermiculatum	cytotoxic metabolite
Verrucosidin	Penicillium verrucosum	cytotoxic pyrone-type polyketide
Verrulactone A	Penicillium	antimicrobial alternariol
Versicolamide B	marine Aspergillus	a paraherquamide-stephacidin
Viscumamide	mangrove-derived endophytic fungi	cyclic peptide
Yaequinolone J1	Penicillium sp. FKI-2140	antibiotic

== See also ==
- Bacillus isolates
- Biotechnology in pharmaceutical manufacturing
- Mycorrhiza
- Aspergillus oryzae, Saccharomyces cerevisiae, Saccharomyces boulardii
- Sponge isolates
- Streptomyces isolates
