= C28H32O8 =

The molecular formula C_{28}H_{32}O_{8} (molar mass: 496.55 g/mol, exact mass: 496.2097 u) may refer to:

- Arisugacin A
- Bisvertinolone
- Trichodimerol
