= Penicillium striatisporum =

Scientific classification
- Kingdom: Fungi
- Division: Ascomycota
- Class: Eurotiomycetes
- Order: Eurotiales
- Family: Aspergillaceae
- Genus: Penicillium
- Species: P. striatisporum

Binomial name
- Penicillium striatisporum Stolk, A.C. 1969

Type strain
- ATCC 22052, BCRC 31679, CBS 705.68, CCRC 31679, CMI 151749, FRR 0827, IHEM 5839, IMI 151749, MUCL 31202

Synonyms
- Scopulariopsis striata

Species of fungus

Penicillium striatisporum is an anamorph species of fungus in the genus Penicillium which was isolated from the rhizosphere of chilli peppers. Penicillium striatisporum has a selective antifungal activity against Candida albicans This species produces striatisporin A, striatisporolide A, versiol, calbistrin C, deformylcalbistrin A, citromycetin, citromycin, fulvic acid, (-)-2,3-dihydrocitromycetin and (+)-hexylitaconic acid
