= C7H12O3 =

The molecular formula C_{7}H_{12}O_{3} (molar mass: 144.17 g/mol, exact mass: 144.0786 u) may refer to:

- Botryodiplodin
- Ethyl levulinate
- Tetrahydrofurfuryl acetate
