= C14H20O4 =

The molecular formula C_{14}H_{20}O_{4} (molar mass: 252.31 g/mol) may refer to:

- 3,4-Epoxycyclohexylmethyl-3’,4’-epoxycyclohexane carboxylate (ECC)
- Sch 642305
