= Penicillium thymicola =

Scientific classification
- Kingdom: Fungi
- Division: Ascomycota
- Class: Eurotiomycetes
- Order: Eurotiales
- Family: Aspergillaceae
- Genus: Penicillium
- Species: P. thymicola

Binomial name
- Penicillium thymicola Frisvad, J.; Samson, R.A. 2004

Type strain
- CBS 111225, IBT 5891

Species of fungus

Penicillium thymicola is a halotolerant species of fungus in the genus Penicillium which produces okaramine A, daldinin D, alantrypinone, seranttrypinone, fumiquinazoline F and fumiquinazoline G.
