= C21H23NO8 =

The molecular formula C_{21}H_{23}NO_{8} (molar mass: 417.409 g/mol, exact mass: 417.1424 u) may refer to:

- 14-Norpseurotin A
- Sorbicillactone A
