= C22H24N2O10 =

The molecular formula C_{22}H_{24}N_{2}O_{10} (molar mass: 476.438 g/mol) may refer to:

- Aspergillusol A
- BAPTA, or 1,2-bis(o-aminophenoxy)ethane-N,N,N′,N′-tetraacetic acid
