= Ternatin =

"Ternatin" is a term used for two unrelated categories of biochemical compounds:

- The ternatin heptapeptide — derived from the mushroom Coriolus versicolor
- Delphinidin ternatins — derivatives of delphinidin, an anthocyanidin
