= C22H32O3 =

The molecular formula C_{22}H_{32}O_{3} may refer to:

- Medrysone
- Medroxyprogesterone
- Metenolone acetate
- ORG-2058
- Penostatin A
- Sargachromanol B
- Stenbolone acetate
- Testosterone propionate
