= Penicillium herquei =

Scientific classification
- Kingdom: Fungi
- Division: Ascomycota
- Class: Eurotiomycetes
- Order: Eurotiales
- Family: Aspergillaceae
- Genus: Penicillium
- Species: P. herquei

Binomial name
- Penicillium herquei Bainier, G.; Sartory, A. 1912

Type strain
- ATCC 10118, BCRC 32592, Biourge 452, CBS 336.48, CCF 2769, CCRC 32592, FRR 1040, IFO 31747, IMI 028809, MUCL 29213, NBRC 31747, NCTC 1721, NRRL 1040, QM 1296, Thom 4640.447, Thom 4640.77

Synonyms
- Penicillium herqueri, Penicillium lemonii, Penicillium elegans, Penicillium luteocoeruleum

Species of fungus

Penicillium herquei is an anamorph, filamentous species of the genus of Penicillium which produces citreorosein, emodin, hualyzin, herquline B, janthinone, citrinin and duclauxin,.
