= C27H31NO5 =

The molecular formula C_{27}H_{31}NO_{5} (molar mass: 449.55 g/mol) may refer to:

- Ignavine
- Yaequinolone J1
