= Cladobotryum elegans =

Scientific classification
- Kingdom: Fungi
- Division: Ascomycota
- Class: Sordariomycetes
- Order: Hypocreales
- Family: Hypocreaceae
- Genus: Cladobotryum
- Species: C. elegans

Binomial name
- Cladobotryum elegans G. Arnaud, 1952

Synonyms
- Calcarisporium arbuscula Preuss, 1851; Verticillium beauverioides Vincens, 1919; Calcarisporium antibioticum Haller & Loeffler, 1969

Species of fungus

Cladobotryum elegans is a species of fungus in the family Hypocreaceae.
