= Acylfulvene =

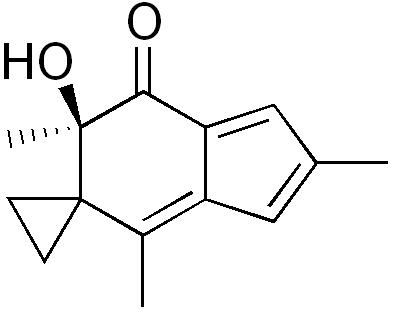

Names
- Preferred IUPAC name (6′R)-6′-Hydroxy-2′,4′,6′-trimethylspiro[cyclopropane-1,5′-inden]-7′(6′H)-one

Identifiers
CAS Number	125392-76-9
3D model (JSmol)	Interactive image; Interactive image
ChEMBL	ChEMBL121987
ChemSpider	324633
PubChem CID	365701
UNII	G4T2FA57Q6
CompTox Dashboard (EPA)	DTXSID30327131
- InChI: InChI=1S/C14H16O2/c1-8-6-10-9(2)14(4-5-14)13(3,16)12(15)11(10)7-8/h6-7,16H,4-5H2,1-3H3/t13-/m0/s1 Key: HLAKJNQXUARACO-ZDUSSCGKSA-N; InChI=1/C14H16O2/c1-8-6-10-9(2)14(4-5-14)13(3,16)12(15)11(10)7-8/h6-7,16H,4-5H2,1-3H3/t13-/m0/s1 Key: HLAKJNQXUARACO-ZDUSSCGKBE
- SMILES: CC1=CC2=C(C3(CC3)C(C(=O)C2=C1)(C)O)C; O=C1C/3=C/C(=CC\3=C(/C2([C@]1(O)C)CC2)C)C

Properties
Chemical formula	C_{14}H_{16}O_{2}
Molar mass	216.28 g/mol
- Except where otherwise noted, data are given for materials in their standard state (at 25 °C [77 °F], 100 kPa). verify (what is ?) Infobox references

Acylfulvene is a class of cytotoxic semi-synthetic derivatives of illudin, a natural product that can be extracted from the jack o'lantern mushroom (Omphalotus olearius). One important acylfulvene, 6-hydroxymethylacylfulvene (irofulven), has been evaluated for the treatment of a wide assortment of cancers and tumors. It is thought that acylfulvene compounds kill cancer cells by DNA alkylation (see DNA methylation).
