= Penicillium duclauxii =

Scientific classification
- Domain: Eukaryota
- Kingdom: Fungi
- Division: Ascomycota
- Class: Eurotiomycetes
- Order: Eurotiales
- Family: Aspergillaceae
- Genus: Penicillium
- Species: P. duclauxii

Binomial name
- Penicillium duclauxii Delacroix, E.G. 1891

Type strain
- ATCC 10439, CBS 322.48, IMI 040044, MUCL 28672, NRRL 1030

Synonyms
- Talaromyces duclauxii

Species of fungus

Penicillium duclauxii is an anamorph species of the genus of Penicillium which produces xenoclauxin and duclauxin.

== Description ==
Colonies on CYA on day 7 are 2.5–3 cm in diameter, somewhat radially striated, with white and yellow mycelium, fluffy, with synnemes, non-spore-bearing or weakly spore-bearing. There is no exudate. The reverse of the colonies is olive-brown in the center, to corn-yellow along the edge. A yellow soluble pigment is released into the medium.

On agar with malt extract (MEA), colonies are with white mycelium, velvety, with synnemes along the edges, with sparse sporulation in gray-green tones. Exudate and soluble pigment are not released. The reverse is brown, brown-yellow closer to the edge.

On agar with yeast extract and sucrose (YES), colonies with white mycelium, concentric-striated, non-spore-bearing. Soluble pigment is not released, the reverse of the colonies is olive-brown, up to gray-yellow along the edges.

Conidiophores are two-tiered tassels with a smooth-walled stem 15–50 μm long and 3–4 μm thick. Metules in the terminal whorl are 2–6, divergent, 8.5–15 μm long. Phialides are needle-shaped, 3–8 in a bundle, 9–15 × 2–3.5 μm. Conidia are ellipsoidal, smooth to barely rough, 3–4 × 1.5–3.5 μm.

== See also ==
- List of Penicillium species
