= Chaetoglobosin A =

Identifiers
| CAS Number | 50335-03-0 |
| 3D model (JSmol) | Interactive image |
| ChEBI | CHEBI:68798 |
| ChemSpider | 4942914 |
| PubChem CID | 6438437 |
| UNII | 73AYL68TNX |
| CompTox Dashboard (EPA) | DTXSID20891790 |
- InChI: InChI=1S/C32H36N2O5/c1-17-8-7-10-22-29-31(4,39-29)19(3)27-24(15-20-16-33-23-11-6-5-9-21(20)23)34-30(38)32(22,27)26(36)13-12-25(35)28(37)18(2)14-17/h5-7,9-14,16-17,19,22,24,27-29,33,37H,8,15H2,1-4H3,(H,34,38)/b10-7+,13-12+,18-14+/t17-,19-,22-,24-,27-,28+,29-,31+,32+/m0/s1 Key: OUMWCYMRLMEZJH-VOXRAUTJSA-N
- SMILES: C[C@H]\1C/C=C/[C@H]2[C@H]3[C@](O3)([C@H]([C@@H]4[C@@]2(C(=O)/C=C/C(=O)[C@@H](/C(=C1)/C)O)C(=O)N[C@H]4CC5=CNC6=CC=CC=C65)C)C

Properties
| Chemical formula | C_{32}H_{36}N_{2}O_{5} |
| Molar mass | 528.649 g·mol^{−1} |
- Except where otherwise noted, data are given for materials in their standard state (at 25 °C [77 °F], 100 kPa). Infobox references

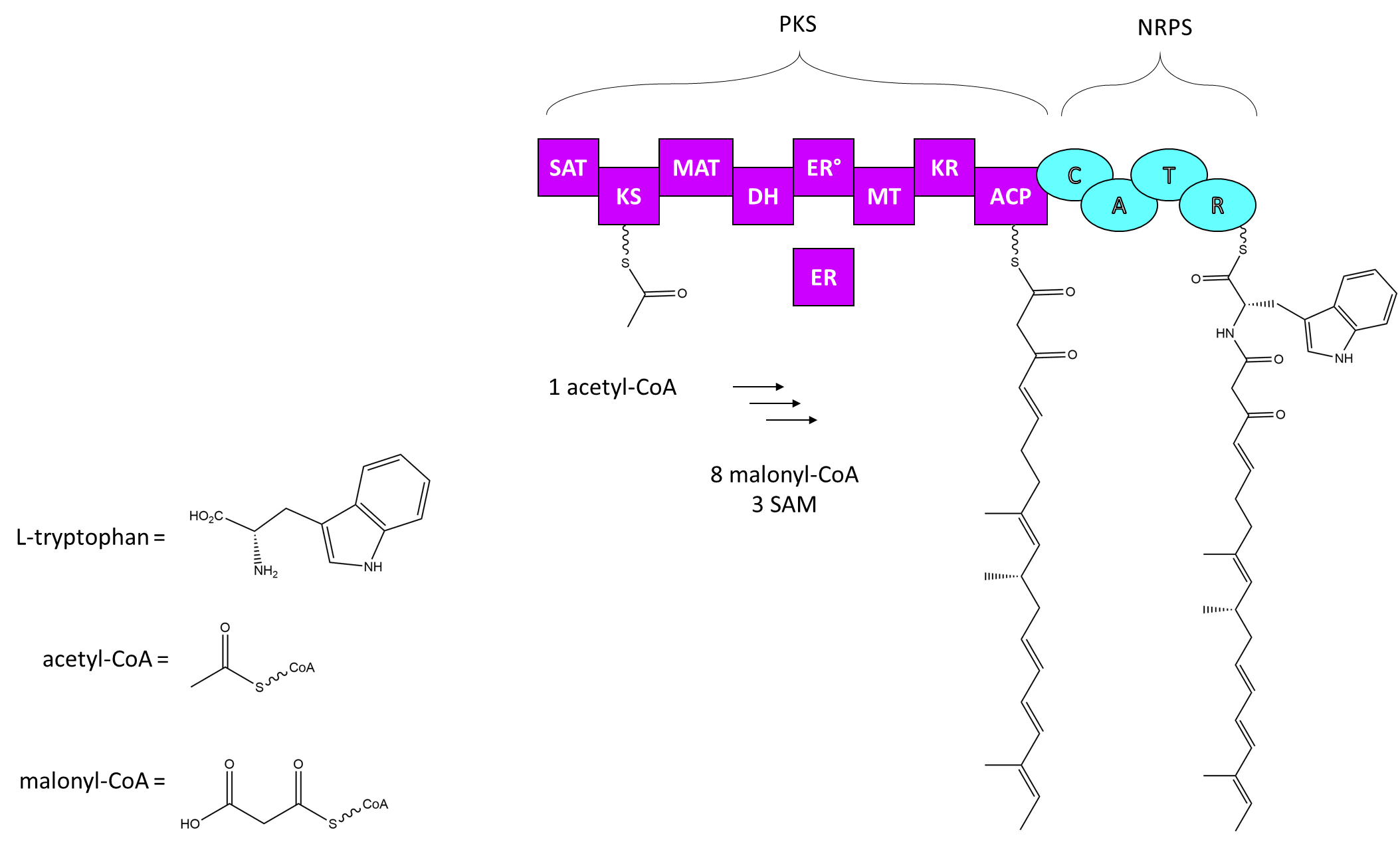
Proposed PKS-NRPS organization responsible for production of (1) in the biosynthesis of chaetoglobosin A.

Chaetoglobosin A is a fungal isolate with anticancer activity in vitro. Derivatives of the compound include MBJ-0038, MBJ-0039, and MBJ-0040.

== Biosynthesis ==
Chaetoglobosin A biosynthesis begins with a product from hybrid PKS-NRPS encoded by the gene CHGG_01239, followed by multiple oxidations which form different intermediates depending on the order of functional groups oxidized. The PKS-NRPS product undergoes a diels alder, to form prochaetoglobosin I (2) and is subsequently oxidized in different paths as shown in the scheme. Either the epoxide is created first to form prochaetoglobosin IV (5), followed by di-hydroxylation to form 20-dihydrochaetoglobosin A (6), and a final oxidation of one hydroxyl to ketone to form chaetoglobosin A, or di-hydroxylation of (2) occurs first, forming cytoglobosin D (3), followed by one hydroxyl oxidation to form chaetoglobosin J (4), and lastly epoxidation to form chaetoglobosin A. Epoxidation of (3) can also occur prior to hydroxyl oxidation to form (6).

Proposed biosynthesis of chaetoglobosin A from (1) as described in "Biosynthesis"
