= FR901483 =

- Chemical structure of FR901483

Names
- IUPAC name (2S,5S,6S,7R,8S,10aS)-6-Hydroxy-5-(4-methoxybenzyl)-2-(methylamino)octahydro-1H-7,10a-methanopyrrolo[1,2-a]azocin-8-yl dihydrogen phosphate

Identifiers
3D model (JSmol)	Interactive image
ChemSpider	28286250
PubChem CID	134974741
- InChI: InChI=1S/C20H31N2O6P/c1-21-14-10-20-8-7-18(28-29(24,25)26)16(11-20)19(23)17(22(20)12-14)9-13-3-5-15(27-2)6-4-13/h3-6,14,16-19,21,23H,7-12H2,1-2H3,(H2,24,25,26)/t14-,16?,17?,18?,19?,20?/m0/s1 Key: CIISYBZFZSWZLX-XSKKXZQRSA-N
- SMILES: CNC1CN2C(Cc3ccc(OC)cc3)C(O)C3CC2(CCC3OP(=O)(O)O)C1

Properties
Chemical formula	C_{20}H_{31}N_{2}O_{6}P
Molar mass	426.450 g·mol^{−1}
- Except where otherwise noted, data are given for materials in their standard state (at 25 °C [77 °F], 100 kPa). Infobox references

(−)-FR901483 is a tyrosine-derived alkaloid that was isolated from the fungus Cladobotryum sp. It was shown to have potent immunosuppressant activity in animal models. It is believed to function through inhibition of purine nucleotide biosynthesis.

== Biosynthesis ==
The biosynthesis of (−)-FR901483 was elucidated by Zhang et al. in 2021. These researchers probed the genome of Cladobotryum sp. for analogues of PsiK from the psilocybin biosynthetic pathway and identified the gene cluster Frz, which contains the sequence for a non-ribosomal peptide synthase FrzA. The cluster also contains 11 other genes which encode a phosphotransferase (FrzJ), a phosphoribosylpyrophosphate amidotransferase (PPAT, FrzK), two P450 monooxygenases (FrzC and FrzL), two methyltransferases (FrzE and FrzF), an ene-reductase (OYE, FrzD), a nonheme, iron and α-ketoglutarate dependent oxygenase (αKG, FrzG), two short-chain dehydrogenase/reductases (SDRs, FrzB, and FrzI), and a hypothetical protein (HP, FrzH). By heterologous expression of these genes in the organism Aspergillus nidulans, they demonstrated that these genes encode enzymes capable of catalyzing the biosynthesis of (−)-FR901483 from L-tyrosine.

The first transformation is catalyzed by FrzA and FrzB, which allows coupling of two tyrosine residues and reduction of the resulting ketones. In the next step, FrzC, a P450 enzyme, catalyzes the subsequent radical oxidative transformation that is NADPH-dependent. Following this, FrzE and FrzF catalyze two S-adenosyl methionine (SAM)-dependent methylations. FrzG then performs an oxidation of an amine, allowing ring opening. Cyclization and reduction is then catalyzed by FrzH. Further ketone reduction is catalyzed by FrzJ. Finally, ATP-dependent phosphorylation is carried out by the activity of FrzJ.
