= Verrulactone =

- Chemical structure of verrulactone A

Identifiers
CAS Number	A: 1369367-58-7; B: 1369367-59-8
3D model (JSmol)	A: Interactive image; B: Interactive image
ChEBI	A: CHEBI:206505; B: CHEBI:199104
ChEMBL	A: ChEMBL2011360; B: ChEMBL2011361
ChemSpider	A: 28289569; B: 28516662
PubChem CID	A: 57404538; B: 57404245
CompTox Dashboard (EPA)	A: DTXSID401336395
- InChI: A: InChI=1S/C28H18O12/c1-37-9-3-11-19(13(29)5-9)27(35)39-17-7-15(31)25(33)23(21(11)17)24-22-12-4-10(38-2)6-14(30)20(12)28(36)40-18(22)8-16(32)26(24)34/h3-8,29-34H,1-2H3 Key: ZSHZQCWUSDSOFB-UHFFFAOYSA-N; B: InChI=1S/C28H18O12/c1-37-9-3-11-12-7-16(31)25(34)23(26(12)40-28(36)19(11)14(29)5-9)22-21-13-4-10(38-2)6-15(30)20(13)27(35)39-18(21)8-17(32)24(22)33/h3-8,29-34H,1-2H3 Key: KILSNFDREQHTBU-UHFFFAOYSA-N
- SMILES: A: COC1=CC2=C(C(=C1)O)C(=O)OC3=C2C(=C(C(=C3)O)O)C4=C(C(=CC5=C4C6=C(C(=CC(=C6)OC)O)C(=O)O5)O)O; B: COC1=CC2=C(C(=C1)O)C(=O)OC3=C(C(=C(C=C23)O)O)C4=C(C(=CC5=C4C6=C(C(=CC(=C6)OC)O)C(=O)O5)O)O
- Except where otherwise noted, data are given for materials in their standard state (at 25 °C [77 °F], 100 kPa). Infobox references

Verrulactones are alternariol-derived antimicrobial chemical compounds isolated from Penicillium.
