= Tetrahydrofurfuryl acetate =

Names
- Preferred IUPAC name (Oxolan-2-yl)methyl acetate
- Other names Tetrahydro-2-furanylmethyl acetate

Identifiers
CAS Number	637-64-9
3D model (JSmol)	Interactive image
ChEBI	CHEBI:169190
ChEMBL	ChEMBL2287522
ChemSpider	21105997
ECHA InfoCard	100.010.270
EC Number	211-296-8
PubChem CID	12506
UNII	I1PIW4REZU
CompTox Dashboard (EPA)	DTXSID30862335
- InChI: InChI=1S/C7H12O3/c1-6(8)10-5-7-3-2-4-9-7/h7H,2-5H2,1H3 Key: AAQDYYFAFXGBFZ-UHFFFAOYSA-N
- SMILES: CC(=O)OCC1CCCO1

Properties
Chemical formula	CH_{3}CO_{2}CH_{2}C_{4}H_{7}O
Molar mass	144.170 g·mol^{−1}
Appearance	clear liquid
Density	1.061 g/cm^{3} (20 °C)
Boiling point	194 °C (381 °F; 467 K)
Solubility in water	Miscible
Solubility in alcohol, chloroform, ether	Soluble
log P	0.349
Refractive index (n_{D})	1.4475 (liquid 20°)

Hazards
- GHS labelling
Pictograms	(GHS07: Exclamation mark)
Signal word	Warning
Hazard statements	H302
Precautionary statements	P264, P270, P301+P317, P330, P501
NFPA 704 (fire diamond)	0 2
Flash point	83 °C (181 °F; 356 K)
- Except where otherwise noted, data are given for materials in their standard state (at 25 °C [77 °F], 100 kPa). (what is ?) Infobox references

Tetrahydrofurfuryl acetate is an organic chemical compound used for food flavouring and cosmetics. It has a fruity ethereal flavour, also described as honey, maple, or bread-like.

It is generally accepted as safe in the USA. Typical levels of use are 2 ppm in drinks, 8 ppm in ice cream, and 20 ppm in baked products and confectionery.

Classified as a heterocyclic ester, it is made by reacting tetrahydrofurfuryl alcohol with acetic anhydride.

Related flavouring compounds are tetrahydrofurfuryl butyrate, tetrahydrofurfuryl cinnamate, tetrahydrofurfuryl alcohol, and tetrahydrofurfuryl propionate.
