= Piscarinine =

2D Structure of Piscarinine A and Piscarinine B

Piscarinines are bioactive alkaloid isolates of Penicillium piscarium NKM F-961 and Penicillium piscarium Westling that belong to a class of naturally occurring 2,5-diketopiperazines. The cytotoxic dehydroproline tryptophan derivatives piscarinines A and B were shown to be active against the prostate cancer cell line LNCAP (IC50 values were 2.2 and 1.9 μg/mL for piscarinine A and B, respectively).
