= Epolactaene =

Names
- IUPAC name Methyl (2E,3E,5E,9E)-2-ethylidene-11-[(1R,5R)-4-hydroxy-4-methyl-2-oxo-6-oxa-3-azabicyclo[3.1.0]hexan-1-yl]-4,10-dimethyl-11-oxoundeca-3,5,9-trienoate

Identifiers
| CAS Number | 167782-17-4 |
| 3D model (JSmol) | Interactive image |
| ChEMBL | ChEMBL183869 |
| ChemSpider | 4946360 |
| PubChem CID | 6442272 |
| UNII | 4S7A4HLA92 |
| CompTox Dashboard (EPA) | DTXSID301045462 |
- InChI: InChI=1S/C21H27NO6/c1-6-15(17(24)27-5)12-13(2)10-8-7-9-11-14(3)16(23)21-18(28-21)20(4,26)22-19(21)25/h6,8,10-12,18,26H,7,9H2,1-5H3,(H,22,25)/b10-8+,13-12+,14-11+,15-6+/t18-,20?,21-/m0/s1 Key: GFRNQYUCUNYIEN-ZLXMTJSISA-N
- SMILES: C/C=C(\C=C(/C)\C=C\CC/C=C(\C)/C(=O)[C@@]12[C@@H](O1)C(NC2=O)(C)O)/C(=O)OC

Properties
| Chemical formula | C_{21}H_{27}NO_{6} |
| Molar mass | 389.448 g·mol^{−1} |
- Except where otherwise noted, data are given for materials in their standard state (at 25 °C [77 °F], 100 kPa). Infobox references

Epolactaene is a neuritogenic fungal isolate.
