= Cephalosporolide =

Chemical structures of selected cephalosporolides

Cephalosporolide B

Cephalosporolide C

Cephalosporolide D

Cephalosporolide E

Cephalosporolide F

Cephalosporolide G

Cephalosporolides are novel lactones isolated from marine Penicillium.

Because of their unusual chemical structures and potential pharmacological effects, several laboratory syntheses for various cephalosporolides have been developed.
