= Vermistatin =

Names
- Preferred IUPAC name (3R)-4,6-Dimethoxy-3-{4-oxo-6-[(1E)-prop-1-en-1-yl]-4H-pyran-3-yl}-2-benzofuran-1(3H)-one
- Other names 5-(4,6-Dimethoxyphthalidyl)-2-propenyl-4H-pyran-4-one

Identifiers
CAS Number	72669-21-7
3D model (JSmol)	Interactive image
ChEMBL	ChEMBL1997854
ChemSpider	4578500
PubChem CID	5467588
UNII	GX8U4VXD8W
CompTox Dashboard (EPA)	DTXSID001045463
- InChI: InChI=1S/C18H16O6/c1-4-5-10-7-14(19)13(9-23-10)17-16-12(18(20)24-17)6-11(21-2)8-15(16)22-3/h4-9,17H,1-3H3/b5-4+/t17-/m0/s1 Key: YORFGPDHNOBVBM-BDUNBXCCSA-N; InChI=1/C18H16O6/c1-4-5-10-7-14(19)13(9-23-10)17-16-12(18(20)24-17)6-11(21-2)8-15(16)22-3/h4-9,17H,1-3H3/b5-4+/t17-/m0/s1 Key: YORFGPDHNOBVBM-BDUNBXCCBS
- SMILES: C/C=C/C1=CC(=O)C(=CO1)[C@H]2C3=C(C=C(C=C3C(=O)O2)OC)OC

Properties
Chemical formula	C_{18}H_{16}O_{6}
Molar mass	328.320 g·mol^{−1}
- Except where otherwise noted, data are given for materials in their standard state (at 25 °C [77 °F], 100 kPa). Infobox references

Vermistatin is an organic compound and a metabolite of mine-dwelling Penicillium vermiculatum found in Berkeley Pit Lake, Butte, Montana. Penisimplicissin is a vermistatin analog with anticancer activity.
