= Vermixocin =

Group of chemical compounds

Vermixocins A and B are isolates of Penicillium vermiculatum. Both compounds have cytotoxic activity in vitro.

Vermixocin A

Vermixocin B
