= Chrysosporide =

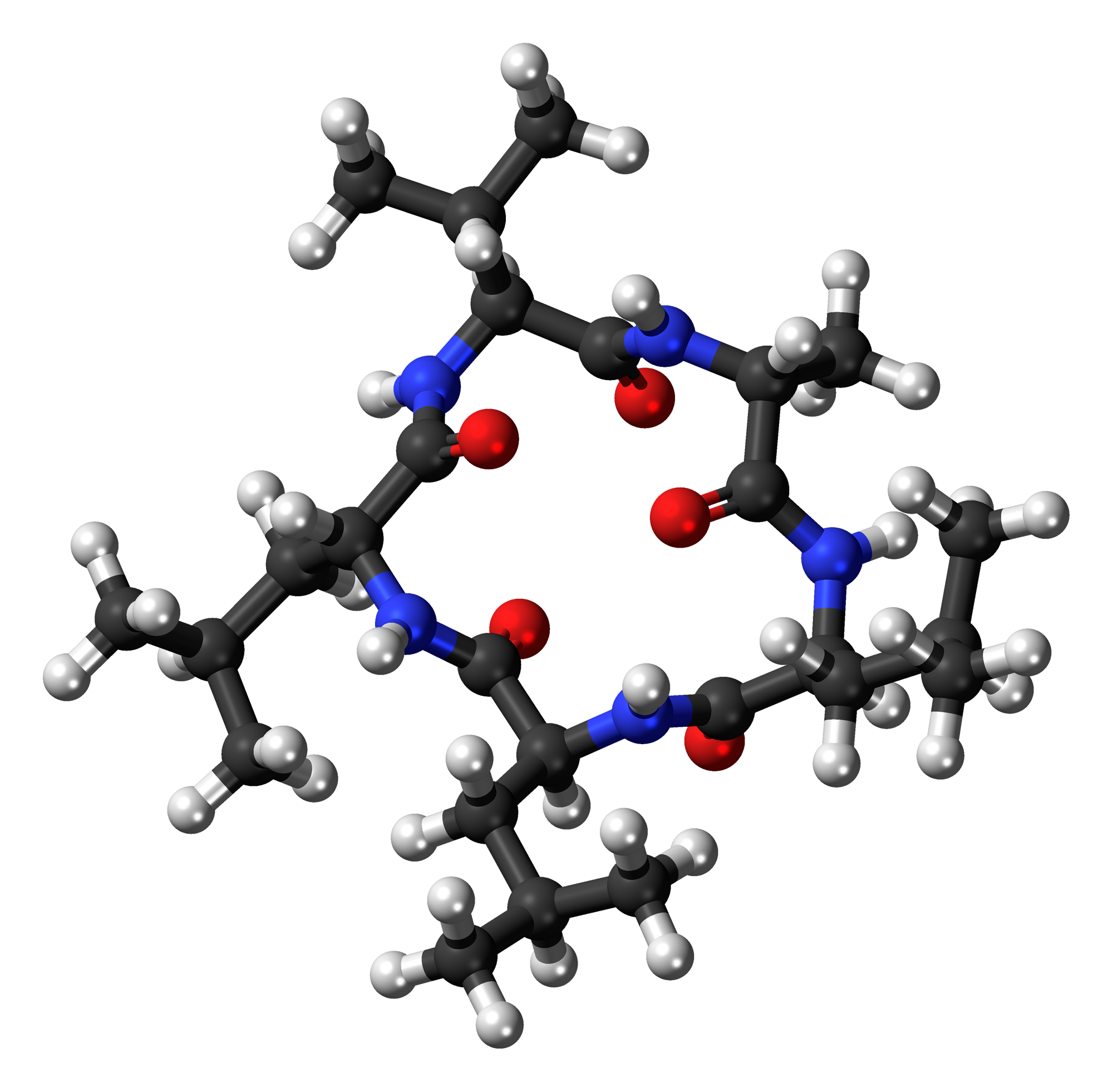

Names
- Other names Cyclo(D-alanyl-L-leucyl-L-leucyl-D-leucyl-L-valyl)

Identifiers
CAS Number	916058-13-4
3D model (JSmol)	Interactive image
ChEMBL	ChEMBL471885
ChemSpider	17250210
PubChem CID	16091636
CompTox Dashboard (EPA)	DTXSID00582134
- InChI: InChI=1S/C26H47N5O5/c1-13(2)10-18-23(33)29-19(11-14(3)4)24(34)30-20(12-15(5)6)25(35)31-21(16(7)8)26(36)27-17(9)22(32)28-18/h13-21H,10-12H2,1-9H3,(H,27,36)(H,28,32)(H,29,33)(H,30,34)(H,31,35)/t17-,18+,19+,20-,21+/m1/s1 Key: IJSHLVSQYSNTII-IFLJBQAJSA-N; InChI=1/C26H47N5O5/c1-13(2)10-18-23(33)29-19(11-14(3)4)24(34)30-20(12-15(5)6)25(35)31-21(16(7)8)26(36)27-17(9)22(32)28-18/h13-21H,10-12H2,1-9H3,(H,27,36)(H,28,32)(H,29,33)(H,30,34)(H,31,35)/t17-,18+,19+,20-,21+/m1/s1 Key: IJSHLVSQYSNTII-IFLJBQAJBN
- SMILES: O=C1N[C@@H](C(=O)N[C@H](C(=O)N[C@@H](C(=O)N[C@H](C(=O)N[C@H]1CC(C)C)CC(C)C)C)C(C)C)CC(C)C

Properties
Chemical formula	C_{26}H_{47}N_{5}O_{5}
Molar mass	509.692 g·mol^{−1}
- Except where otherwise noted, data are given for materials in their standard state (at 25 °C [77 °F], 100 kPa). verify (what is ?) Infobox references

Chrysosporide is a cyclic pentapeptide. It is isolated from the mycoparasitic fungus Sepedonium chrysospermum, found in New Zealand.

It is known that "fungi are well-known producers of a diversity of cyclic peptides with interesting structures and biological activities.... Interest in cyclic peptides is due to their significant biological activities, such as antimicrobial, insecticidal, cytotoxic, and anticancer activities, in addition to their important physiological and ecological functions."
