= Petrosifungin =

- Petrosifungin A

- Petrosifungin B

Identifiers
3D model (JSmol)	A: Interactive image; B: Interactive image
ChEBI	A: CHEBI:203373; B: CHEBI:202966
ChemSpider	A: 10186288; B: 10186289
PubChem CID	A: 21576433; B: 21576434
- InChI: A: InChI=1S/C33H45N5O7/c1-20(2)26-32(43)37-19-11-16-24(37)30(41)36-17-9-7-14-23(36)31(42)38-18-10-8-15-25(38)33(44)45-21(3)27(29(40)34-26)35-28(39)22-12-5-4-6-13-22/h4-6,12-13,20-21,23-27H,7-11,14-19H2,1-3H3,(H,34,40)(H,35,39)/t21-,23+,24+,25+,26+,27+/m1/s1 Key: DZRYOWIZOWQPCR-JIGKBLADSA-N; B: InChI=1S/C33H45N5O8/c1-19(2)26-32(44)37-18-8-11-24(37)30(42)36-16-6-4-9-23(36)31(43)38-17-7-5-10-25(38)33(45)46-20(3)27(29(41)34-26)35-28(40)21-12-14-22(39)15-13-21/h12-15,19-20,23-27,39H,4-11,16-18H2,1-3H3,(H,34,41)(H,35,40)/t20-,23+,24+,25+,26+,27+/m1/s1 Key: RQAOOOGBRZTWIS-VUXQNLRASA-N
- SMILES: A: C[C@@H]1[C@@H](C(=O)N[C@H](C(=O)N2CCC[C@H]2C(=O)N3CCCC[C@H]3C(=O)N4CCCC[C@H]4C(=O)O1)C(C)C)NC(=O)C5=CC=CC=C5; B: C[C@@H]1[C@@H](C(=O)N[C@H](C(=O)N2CCC[C@H]2C(=O)N3CCCC[C@H]3C(=O)N4CCCC[C@H]4C(=O)O1)C(C)C)NC(=O)C5=CC=CC=C5

Properties
Chemical formula	A: C_{33}H_{45}N_{5}O_{7} B: C_{33}H_{45}N_{5}O_{8}
Molar mass	A: 623.7 g/mol B: 639.7 g/mol
- Except where otherwise noted, data are given for materials in their standard state (at 25 °C [77 °F], 100 kPa). Infobox references

Petrosifungins are cyclodepsipeptides isolated from a sponge-residing Penicillium.
