= Codinaeopsin =

Names
- IUPAC name 5-((1H-indol-3-yl)methyl)-3-((1R,2R,4aS,6R,8S,8aS)-2-((E)-but-2-en-2-yl)-4a,6,8-trimethyl-1,2,4a,5,6,7,8,8a-octahydronaphthalene-1-carbonyl)-5-hydroxy-1H-pyrrol-2(5'H)-one

Identifiers
CAS Number	1055291-88-7
3D model (JSmol)	Interactive image
ChEBI	CHEBI:222711
ChemSpider	129562509
PubChem CID	102412273
CompTox Dashboard (EPA)	DTXSID201336113
- InChI: InChI=1S/C32H40N2O3/c1-7-19(3)26-21(5)14-31(6)13-18(2)12-20(4)28(31)27(26)29(35)24-16-32(37,34-30(24)36)15-22-17-33-25-11-9-8-10-23(22)25/h7-11,14,16-18,20,26-28,33,37H,12-13,15H2,1-6H3,(H,34,36)/b19-7+/t18-,20+,26-,27-,28+,31+,32?/m1/s1 Key: FFIWOIAVVDGNHZ-ZQXRKGDHSA-N
- SMILES: C/C=C(\C)/[C@H]1[C@H]([C@@H]2[C@H](C[C@H](C[C@]2(C=C1C)C)C)C)C(=O)C3=CC(NC3=O)(CC4=CNC5=CC=CC=C54)O

Properties
Chemical formula	C_{32}H_{40}N_{2}O_{3}
Molar mass	500.683 g·mol^{−1}
- Except where otherwise noted, data are given for materials in their standard state (at 25 °C [77 °F], 100 kPa). verify (what is ?) Infobox references

Codinaeopsin is an antimalarial alkaloid isolated from a endophytic mold found in Vochysia trees in Costa Rica. It is reported to have bioactivity against Plasmodium falciparum with an IC_{50} = 2.3 μg/mL (4.7 μM). Pure codinaeopsin was reported to be isolated with a total yield of 18 mg/mL from cultured fungus. The biosynthesis of codinaeopsin involves a polyketide synthase-nonribosomal peptide synthetase (PKS-NRPS) hybrid.

== Biosynthesis ==
=== Formation of linear polyketide ===
The first step of the biosynthesis of codinaeopsin involves the assembly of the a linear polyketide by use of seven modules and incorporation of six methylmalonyl CoAs and one malonyl CoA by polyketide synthases (type I PKSs).

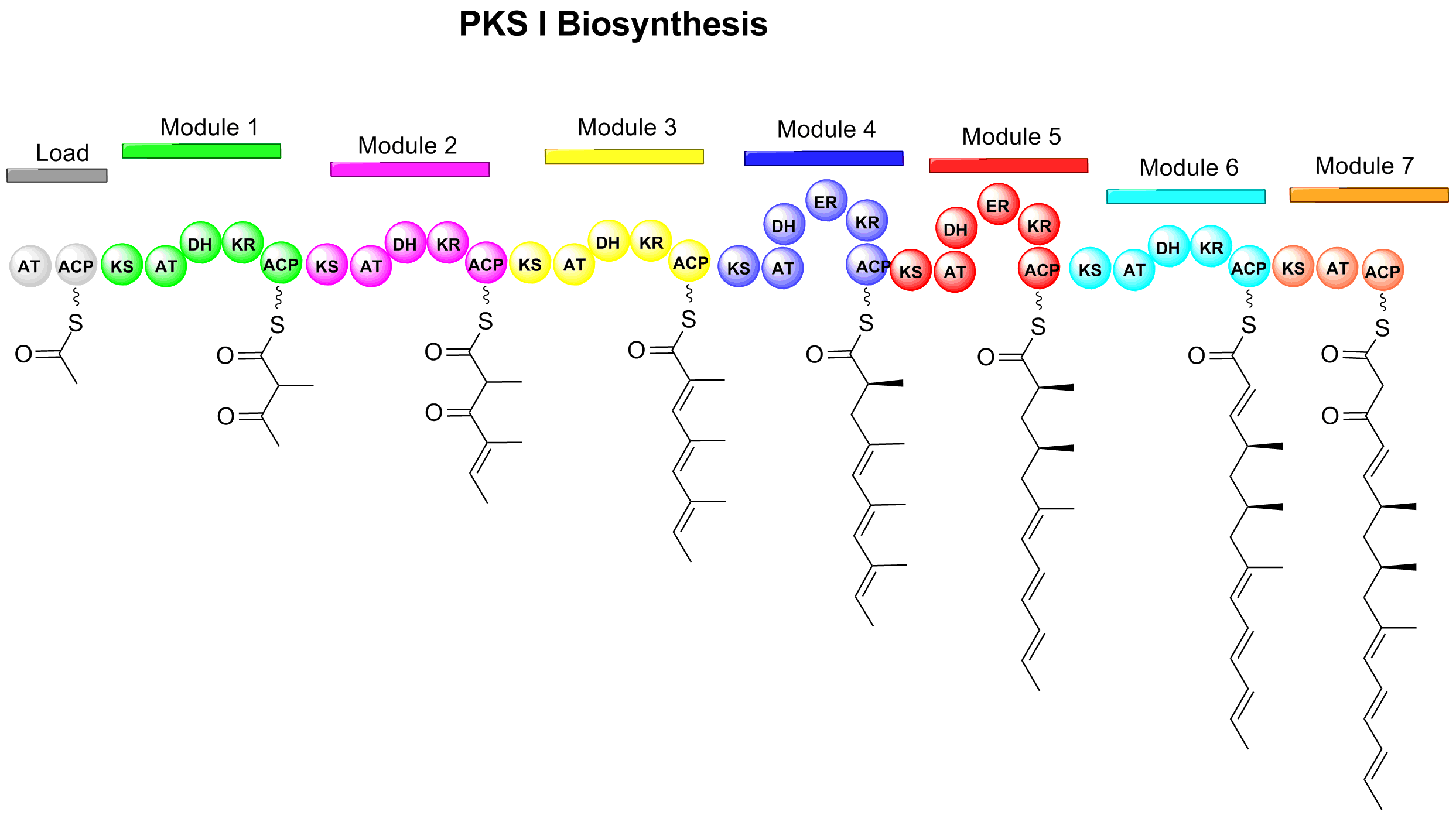
Figure 1. Formation of linear polyketide

=== Formation of tetramic acid (2,4-pyrrolidinone) ===
L-Tryptophan is introduced by a nonribosomal peptide synthetase (NRPS) module and results in the central heterocyclic tetramic acid (2,4-pyrrolidinone). The formal oxidation-reduction is found to be achieved by a series of tautomeric shifts involving enol and imine intermediates in the ring and consistent by discovery both C-2’ epimers.

=== Cyclization of PKS-assembled unit ===
The PKS unit is hypothesized to cyclize by a Diels-Alder-like addition similar to other natural products such as lovastatin and solanapyrone.

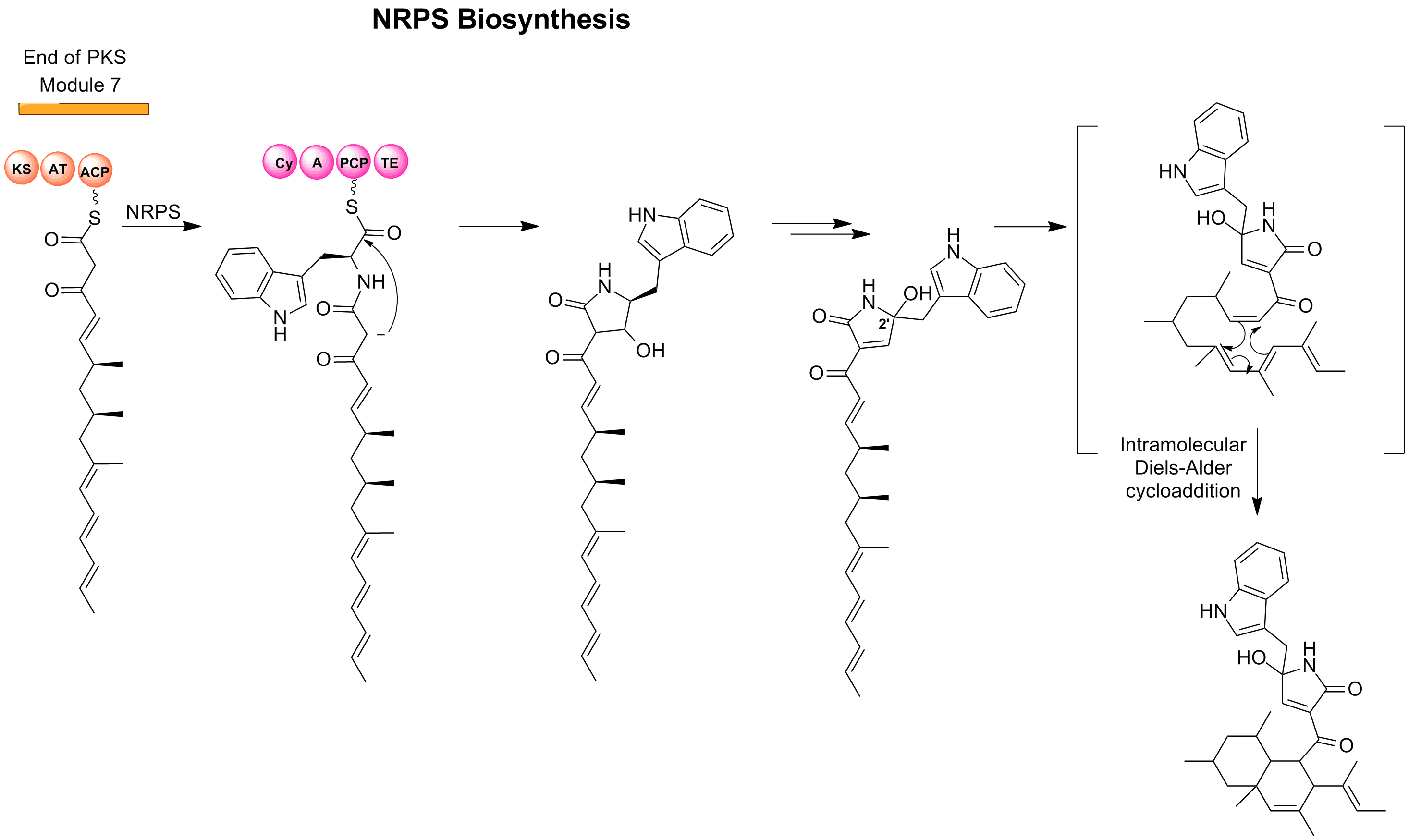
Figure 2. Formation of tetramic acid and cyclization of PKS unit
