= Aurantiomide =

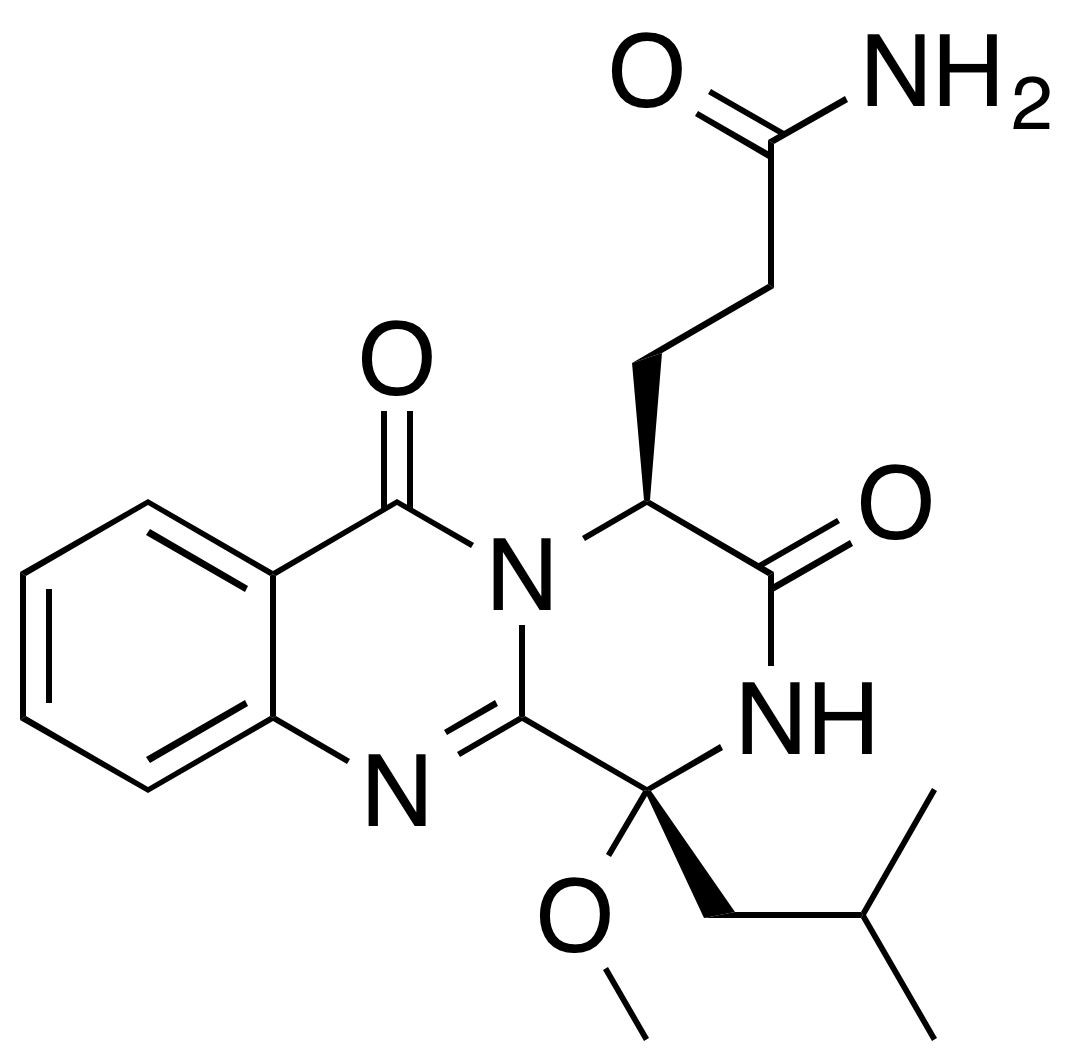

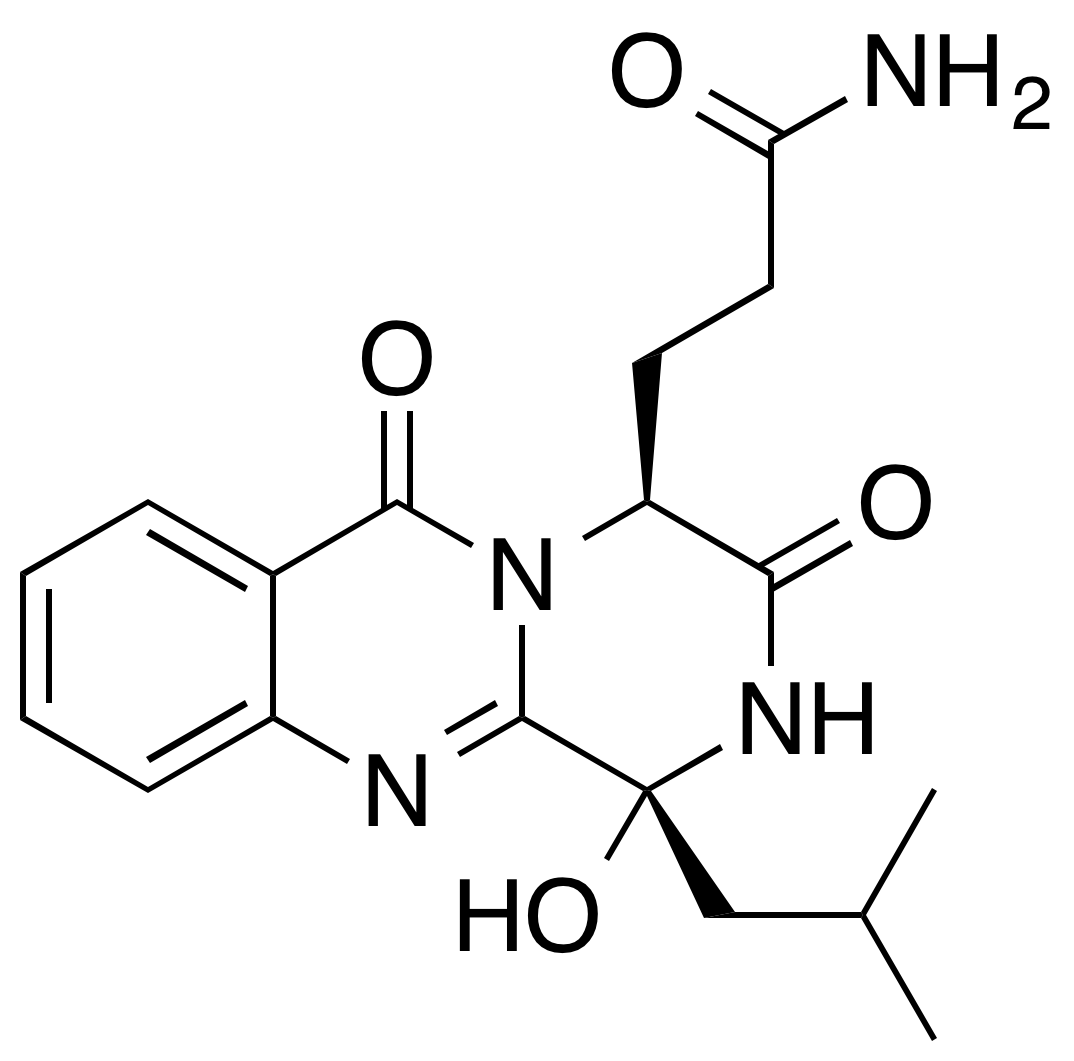

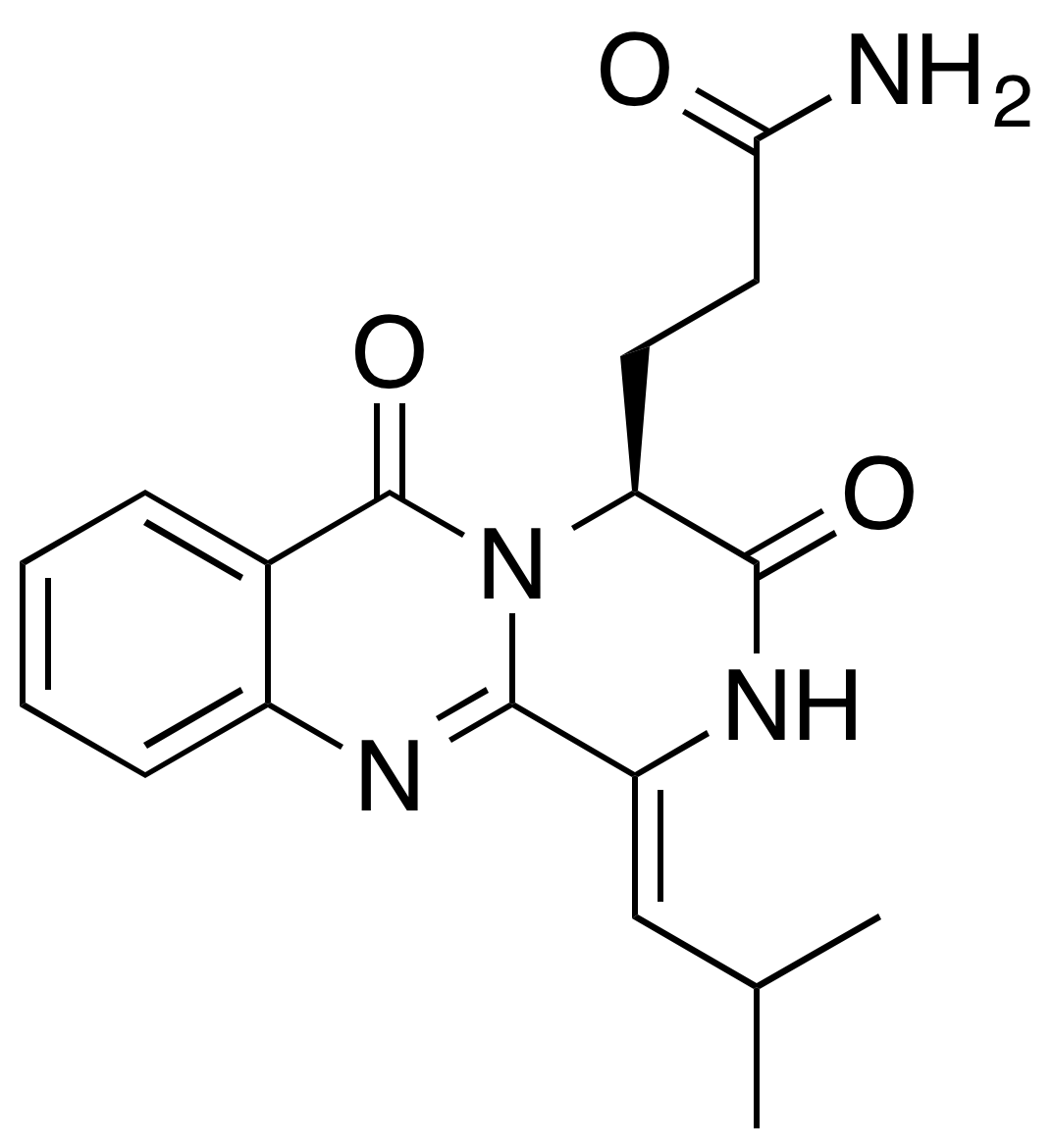

Identifiers
CAS Number	A: 915190-85-1; B: 915190-84-0; C: 915190-86-2
3D model (JSmol)	A: Interactive image; B: Interactive image; C: Interactive image
ChEMBL	A: ChEMBL437875; B: ChEMBL227765; C: ChEMBL227844
ChemSpider	A: 17614095; B: 17613453; C: 17613454
PubChem CID	A: 16681444; B: 16680721; C: 16680722
CompTox Dashboard (EPA)	A: DTXSID101045597; B: DTXSID801045598; C: DTXSID401045596
- InChI: A: InChI=1S/C19H24N4O4/c1-11(2)10-19(27-3)18-21-13-7-5-4-6-12(13)17(26)23(18)14(16(25)22-19)8-9-15(20)24/h4-7,11,14H,8-10H2,1-3H3,(H2,20,24)(H,22,25)/t14-,19+/m0/s1 Key: YQGOVBHFRUCFDP-IFXJQAMLSA-N; B: InChI=1S/C18H22N4O4/c1-10(2)9-18(26)17-20-12-6-4-3-5-11(12)16(25)22(17)13(15(24)21-18)7-8-14(19)23/h3-6,10,13,26H,7-9H2,1-2H3,(H2,19,23)(H,21,24)/t13-,18+/m0/s1 Key: VZHFOIYILDANRZ-SCLBCKFNSA-N; C: InChI=1S/C18H20N4O3/c1-10(2)9-13-16-20-12-6-4-3-5-11(12)18(25)22(16)14(17(24)21-13)7-8-15(19)23/h3-6,9-10,14H,7-8H2,1-2H3,(H2,19,23)(H,21,24)/b13-9-/t14-/m0/s1 Key: UKYRPVOCKVERNT-XXYUJHKVSA-N
- SMILES: A: CC(C)C[C@]1(c2nc3ccccc3c(=O)n2[C@H](C(=O)N1)CCC(=O)N)OC; B: CC(C)C[C@]1(c2nc3ccccc3c(=O)n2[C@H](C(=O)N1)CCC(=O)N)O; C: CC(C)/C=C\1/C2=NC3=CC=CC=C3C(=O)N2[C@H](C(=O)N1)CCC(=O)N
- Except where otherwise noted, data are given for materials in their standard state (at 25 °C [77 °F], 100 kPa). Infobox references

Aurantiomides are quinazoline alkaloids, isolated from the fungus Penicillium aurantiogriseum. Aurantiomide is contained in the traditional Chinese medicine LeZhe.

include:

- Aurantiomide A, C_{19}H_{24}N_{4}O_{4}
- Aurantiomide B, C_{18}H_{22}N_{4}O_{4}
- Aurantiomide C, C_{18}H_{20}N_{4}O_{3}
