= Trachyspic acid =

Names
- IUPAC name 2-(Carboxymethyl)-8-nonyl-9-oxo-1,6-dioxaspiro[4.4]non-7-ene-2,3-dicarboxylic acid

Identifiers
CAS Number	149718-37-6
3D model (JSmol)	Interactive image
ChEBI	CHEBI:66260
ChemSpider	58539306
PubChem CID	9909587
UNII	VJA25444QX
- InChI: InChI=1S/C19H26O9/c1-2-3-4-5-6-7-8-12-11-27-19(15(12)22)9-13(16(23)24)18(28-19,17(25)26)10-14(20)21/h11,13H,2-10H2,1H3,(H,20,21)(H,23,24)(H,25,26)/t13-,18+,19+/m0/s1 Key: NYTZRXWHGZGDDX-MJXNMMHHSA-N
- SMILES: CCCCCCCCC1=CO[C@]2(C1=O)C[C@H]([C@](O2)(CC(=O)O)C(=O)O)C(=O)O

Properties
Chemical formula	C_{20}H_{28}O_{9}
Molar mass	412.435 g·mol^{−1}
- Except where otherwise noted, data are given for materials in their standard state (at 25 °C [77 °F], 100 kPa). Infobox references

Trachyspic acid is a fungal isolate that can inhibit heparanase.
