= Malettinin =

Malettinins are polyketide-derived antimicrobial compounds produced by fungal ascomycetes in the genus Hypoxylon.

== Chemical structures ==
Malettinin A

Malettinin B

Malettinin C

Malettinin D

Malettinin E
