= Notoamide =

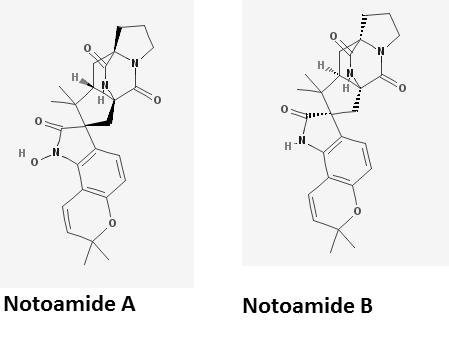
Notoamide A and B

Notoamides are bio-active isolates of marine Aspergillus.
