= Shearinine =

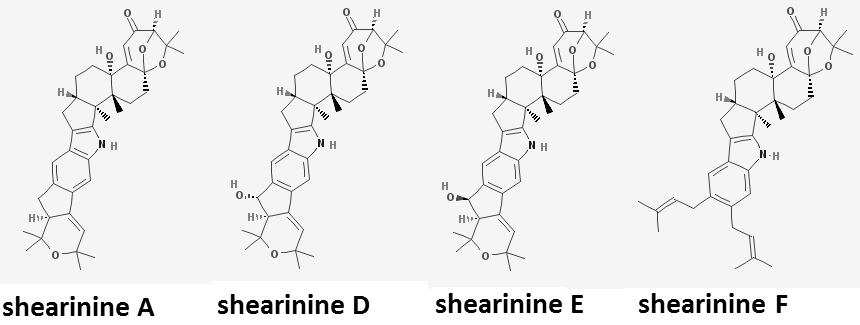
Shearinines A, D, E, and F

Shearinines A, D, E, and F, are marine fungal isolates with anticancer activity in vitro. They were isolated from a stain of Penicillium janthinellum Biourge. Their potential anticancer activity has been suggested by their induction of apoptosis in HL-60 cells. Shearinines D, E and G have also been found to block activity on large-conductance calcium-activated potassium channels.
