= Luteusin A =

Names
- Preferred IUPAC name (7S,8R)-5-Chloro-3-[(1E,3E,5S)-3,5-dimethylhepta-1,3-dien-1-yl]-7,8-dihydroxy-7-methyl-7,8-dihydro-6H-2-benzopyran-6-one

Identifiers
CAS Number	119993-48-5
3D model (JSmol)	Interactive image
ChemSpider	4977335
PubChem CID	6475615
CompTox Dashboard (EPA)	DTXSID801045455
- InChI: InChI=1S/C19H23ClO4/c1-5-11(2)8-12(3)6-7-13-9-14-15(10-24-13)17(21)19(4,23)18(22)16(14)20/h6-11,17,21,23H,5H2,1-4H3/b7-6+,12-8+/t11-,17+,19-/m0/s1 Key: ZFOBGKZKFOAYTR-CZYMVTAPSA-N; InChI=1/C19H23ClO4/c1-5-11(2)8-12(3)6-7-13-9-14-15(10-24-13)17(21)19(4,23)18(22)16(14)20/h6-11,17,21,23H,5H2,1-4H3/b7-6+,12-8+/t11-,17+,19-/m0/s1 Key: ZFOBGKZKFOAYTR-CZYMVTAPBB
- SMILES: CC[C@H](C)/C=C(\C)/C=C/C1=CC2=C(C(=O)[C@@]([C@@H](C2=CO1)O)(C)O)Cl

Properties
Chemical formula	C_{19}H_{23}ClO_{4}
Molar mass	350.84 g·mol^{−1}
- Except where otherwise noted, data are given for materials in their standard state (at 25 °C [77 °F], 100 kPa). Infobox references

Luteusin A is an azaphilone monoamine oxidase inhibitor produced by Talaromyces luteus.
