= Versicolamide B =

Structures of (-) and (+) Versicolamide B

(-)-Versicolamide B and (+)-Versicolamide B are spiroindole alkaloids isolated from the fungus Aspergillus that belong to a class of naturally occurring 2,5-diketopiperazines. The versicolamides are structurally complex spiro-cyclized versions of prenylated cyclo(L-Trp-L-Pro) derivatives which possess a unique spiro-fusion to a pyrrolidine at the 3-position of the oxindole core together with the bicyclo[2.2.2]diazaoctane ring system. While (-)-versicolamide B was isolated from the marine fungus Aspergillus sp. the enantiomer (+)-versicolamide B was isolated from the terrestrial fungi Aspergillus versicolor NRRL. The total asymmetric syntheses of both enantiomers have been achieved and the implications of their biosynthesis have been investigated.
