= Antiamoebin =

Names
- IUPAC name 2-[[(4S)-1-[2-[2-[[2-[[2-[[(2R)-2-[[2-[2-[2-[(2-acetamido-3-phenylpropanoyl)-methylamino]propanoyl-methylamino]propanoyl-methylamino]acetyl]amino]-2-methylbutanoyl]amino]acetyl]amino]-4-methylpentanoyl]-methylamino]propanoyl-methylamino]acetyl]-4-hydroxypyrrolidine-2-carbonyl]amino]-N-[(2R)-1-[(4S)-4-hydroxy-2-[[1-[2-[[(2S)-1-hydroxy-3-phenylpropan-2-yl]carbamoyl]pyrrolidin-1-yl]-1-oxopropan-2-yl]-methylcarbamoyl]pyrrolidin-1-yl]-2-methyl-1-oxobutan-2-yl]pentanediamide

Identifiers
CAS Number	12692-85-2
3D model (JSmol)	Interactive image
ChemSpider	17314810
PubChem CID	16132282
- InChI: InChI=1S/C82H127N17O20/c1-20-81(18,96-70(115)78(12,13)94-69(114)77(10,11)93-67(112)75(6,7)90-63(108)55(85-47(5)101)39-49-31-26-23-27-32-49)71(116)84-42-60(105)87-54(37-46(3)4)62(107)89-76(8,9)68(113)95-80(16,17)73(118)98-43-51(102)40-57(98)65(110)88-53(34-35-59(83)104)61(106)92-82(19,21-2)74(119)99-44-52(103)41-58(99)66(111)91-79(14,15)72(117)97-36-28-33-56(97)64(109)86-50(45-100)38-48-29-24-22-25-30-48/h22-27,29-32,46,50-58,100,102-103H,20-21,28,33-45H2,1-19H3,(H2,83,104)(H,84,116)(H,85,101)(H,86,109)(H,87,105)(H,88,110)(H,89,107)(H,90,108)(H,91,111)(H,92,106)(H,93,112)(H,94,114)(H,95,113)(H,96,115)/t50-,51+,52+,53-,54-,55-,56-,57-,58-,81+,82+/m0/s1 Key: LGSGBGFDMUQNNJ-VRRPPZCSSA-N
- SMILES: CC[C@@](C)(C(=O)NCC(=O)N[C@@H](CC(C)C)C(=O)NC(C)(C)C(=O)NC(C)(C)C(=O)N1C[C@@H](C[C@H]1C(=O)N[C@@H](CCC(=O)N)C(=O)N[C@@](C)(CC)C(=O)N2C[C@@H](C[C@H]2C(=O)NC(C)(C)C(=O)N3CCC[C@H]3C(=O)N[C@@H](Cc4ccccc4)CO)O)O)NC(=O)C(C)(C)NC(=O)C(C)(C)NC(=O)C(C)(C)NC(=O)[C@H](Cc5ccccc5)NC(=O)C

Properties
Chemical formula	C_{80}H_{123}N_{17}O_{20}
Molar mass	1642.963 g·mol^{−1}
- Except where otherwise noted, data are given for materials in their standard state (at 25 °C [77 °F], 100 kPa). Infobox references

Antiamoebin is an anti-microbial/protozoan polypeptide of fungal origin.
