= Eupenifeldin =

Names
- IUPAC name (1R,3R,4R,14S,17E,20R)-3,9,25-trihydroxy-4,11,16,16,20,27-hexamethyl-5,21-dioxapentacyclo[18.9.0.0^{4,14}.0^{6,12}.0^{22,28}]nonacosa-6,9,11,17,22,25,27-heptaene-8,24-dione

Identifiers
CAS Number	151803-45-1
3D model (JSmol)	Interactive image
ChEMBL	ChEMBL402418
ChemSpider	58909237
PubChem CID	135462899
- InChI: InChI=1S/C33H40O7/c1-18-10-24(34)26(36)15-28-22(18)12-20-14-30(38)33(6)21(17-31(3,4)8-7-9-32(20,5)39-28)13-23-19(2)11-25(35)27(37)16-29(23)40-33/h7-8,10-11,15-16,20-21,30,38H,9,12-14,17H2,1-6H3,(H,34,36)(H,35,37)/b8-7+/t20-,21-,30-,32-,33-/m1/s1 Key: BWTQHPFSWXJOGP-CPQZRDRWSA-N
- SMILES: CC1=C2C[C@@H]3C[C@H]([C@]4([C@H](CC5=C(C=C(C(=O)C=C5O4)O)C)CC(/C=C/C[C@]3(OC2=CC(=O)C(=C1)O)C)(C)C)C)O

Properties
Chemical formula	C_{33}H_{40}O_{7}
Molar mass	548.676 g·mol^{−1}
- Except where otherwise noted, data are given for materials in their standard state (at 25 °C [77 °F], 100 kPa). Infobox references

Eupenifeldin is a cytotoxic bistropolone isolate of Eupenicillium brefeldianum.
