= Ergostine =

Names
- IUPAC name 5′α-Benzyl-2′β-ethyl-12′-hydroxyergotaman-3′,6′,18-trione
- Systematic IUPAC name (6aR,9R)-N-[(2R,5S,10aS,10bS)-5-Benzyl-2-ethyl-10b-hydroxy-3,6-dioxooctahydro-8H-[1,3]oxazolo[3,2-a]pyrrolo[2,1-c]pyrazin-2-yl]-7-methyl-4,6,6a,7,8,9-hexahydroindolo[4,3-fg]quinoline-9-carboxamide

Identifiers
CAS Number	2854-38-8
3D model (JSmol)	Interactive image
ChemSpider	19988989
PubChem CID	12308959
UNII	8RM45QOC5P
CompTox Dashboard (EPA)	DTXSID10951231
- InChI: InChI=1S/C34H37N5O5/c1-3-33(36-30(40)22-16-24-23-11-7-12-25-29(23)21(18-35-25)17-26(24)37(2)19-22)32(42)39-27(15-20-9-5-4-6-10-20)31(41)38-14-8-13-28(38)34(39,43)44-33/h4-7,9-12,16,18,22,26-28,35,43H,3,8,13-15,17,19H2,1-2H3,(H,36,40)/t22-,26-,27+,28+,33-,34+/m1/s1 Key: BOLCFGMGGWCOOE-CTTKVJGISA-N
- SMILES: CC[C@@]1(C(=O)N2[C@H](C(=O)N3CCC[C@H]3[C@@]2(O1)O)Cc4ccccc4)NC(=O)[C@H]5CN([C@@H]6Cc7c[nH]c8c7c(ccc8)C6=C5)C

Properties
Chemical formula	C_{34}H_{37}N_{5}O_{5}
Molar mass	595.700 g·mol^{−1}
- Except where otherwise noted, data are given for materials in their standard state (at 25 °C [77 °F], 100 kPa). Infobox references

Ergostine is an ergoloid-like chemical compound produced by the fungus Claviceps purpurea.
