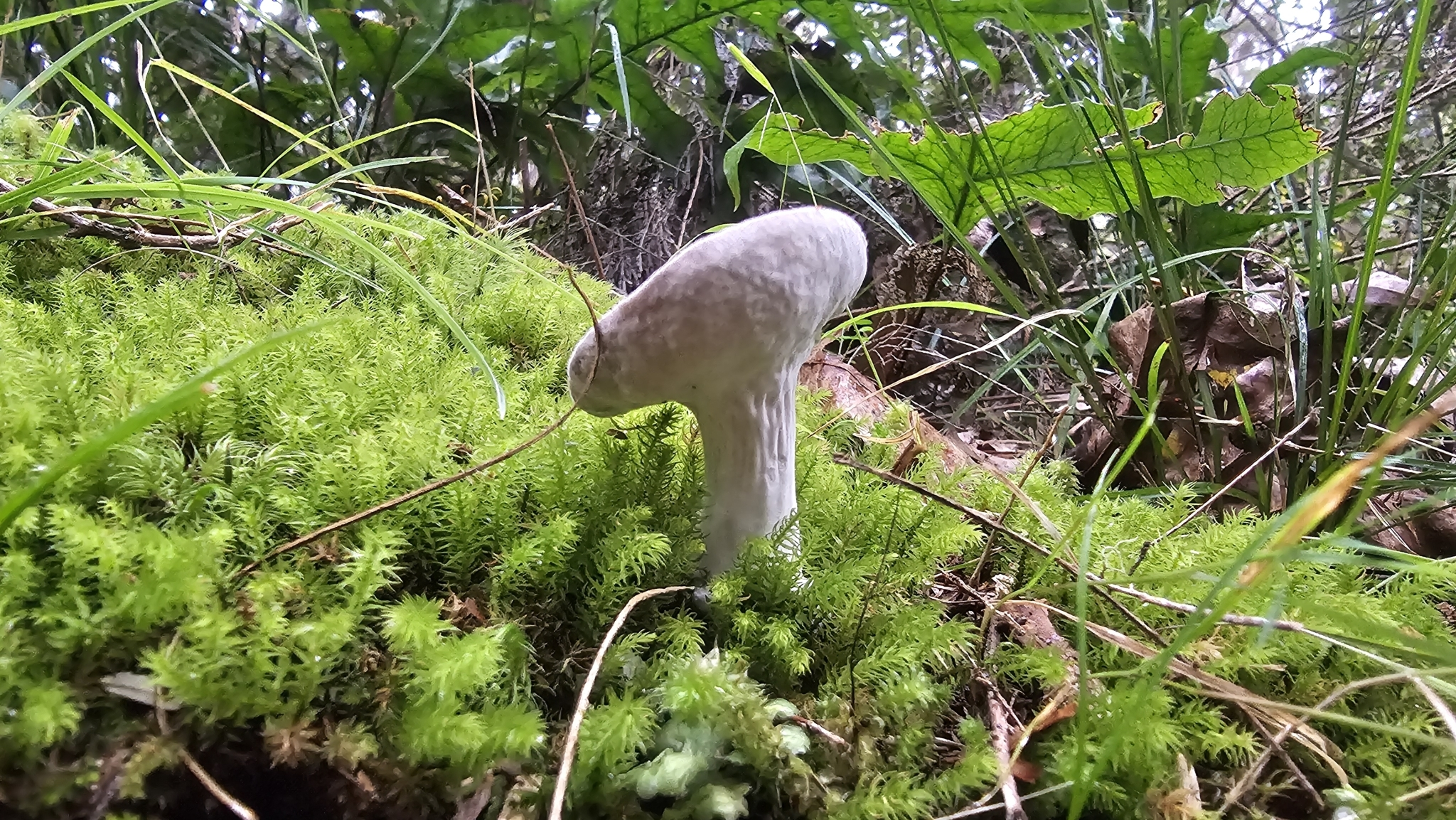
- Cladobotryum sp. in New Zealand

Scientific classification
- Kingdom: Fungi
- Division: Ascomycota
- Class: Sordariomycetes
- Order: Hypocreales
- Family: Hypocreaceae
- Genus: Cladobotryum; Nees, 1817

Species
- see text

Synonyms
- Helminthophora Bonord., 1851; Diplocladium Bonord., 1851; Mucrosporium Preuss, 1851; Sibirina G.R.W. Arnold, 1970; Sympodiophora G.R.W. Arnold, 1970; Pseudohansfordia G.R.W. Arnold, 1970; Eurasina G.R.W. Arnold, 1970; Arnoldia D.J. Gray & Morgan-Jones, 1980

= Cladobotryum =

Genus of fungi

Cladobotryum is a genus of fungi in the family Hypocreaceae.

== Species ==
Cladobotryum agaricina - Cladobotryum aleuritidis - Cladobotryum aleuritis - Cladobotryum amazonense - Cladobotryum apiculatum - Cladobotryum arnoldii - Cladobotryum arnoldii - Cladobotryum arthrobotryoides - Cladobotryum asterophorum - Cladobotryum australe - Cladobotryum binatum - Cladobotryum campanisporum - Cladobotryum capitatum - Cladobotryum caribense - Cladobotryum clavisporum - Cladobotryum compactum - Cladobotryum coriolopsicola - Cladobotryum croceum - Cladobotryum cubitense - Cladobotryum curvatum - Cladobotryum curvididymum - Cladobotryum dendroides - Cladobotryum dimorphicum - Cladobotryum elegans - Cladobotryum fungicola - Cladobotryum gamsii - Cladobotryum gelatinosum - Cladobotryum gracile - Cladobotryum heterocladum - Cladobotryum heterosporum - Cladobotryum hughesii - Cladobotryum indoafrum - Cladobotryum leptosporum - Cladobotryum longiramosum - Cladobotryum macrosporum - Cladobotryum multiseptatum - Cladobotryum mycophilum - Cladobotryum novovarium - Cladobotryum obconicum - Cladobotryum odorum - Cladobotryum orthosporum - Cladobotryum ovalisporum - Cladobotryum paravirescens - Cladobotryum penicillatum - Cladobotryum pinarense - Cladobotryum polypori - Cladobotryum protrusum - Cladobotryum purpureum - Cladobotryum restrictum - Cladobotryum rubrobrunnescens - Cladobotryum semicirculare - Cladobotryum simplex - Cladobotryum soroaense - Cladobotryum sphaerocephalum - Cladobotryum stereicola - Cladobotryum succineum - Cladobotryum tchimbelense - Cladobotryum tenue - Cladobotryum ternatum - Cladobotryum terrigenum - Cladobotryum thuemenii - Cladobotryum tulasnei - Cladobotryum uniseptatum - Cladobotryum variospermum - Cladobotryum varium - Cladobotryum verticillatum - Cladobotryum virescens - Cladobotryum viridigriseum
