= Rugulovasine =

Names
- IUPAC name: A: (4S,5R)-4'-methyl-4-(methylamino)-3,4-dihydro-1H,5'H-spiro[benzo[cd]indole-5,2'-furan]-5'-one; B: (4R,5R)-4'-methyl-4-(methylamino)-3,4-dihydro-1H,5'H-spiro[benzo[cd]indole-5,2'-furan]-5'-one

Identifiers
CAS Number	A: 26909-33-1; 26909-34-2
3D model (JSmol)	A: Interactive image; B: Interactive image
ChemSpider	A: 103037; B: 106408
PubChem CID	A: 115153; B: 119088
- InChI: A: InChI=1/C16H16N2O2/c1-9-7-16(20-15(9)19)11-4-3-5-12-14(11)10(8-18-12)6-13(16)17-2/h3-5,7-8,13,17-18H,6H2,1-2H3/t13-,16+/s2 Key: QTWQJTORJVFWAQ-WKTCHCBJNA-N; B: InChI=1/C16H16N2O2/c1-9-7-16(20-15(9)19)11-4-3-5-12-14(11)10(8-18-12)6-13(16)17-2/h3-5,7-8,13,17-18H,6H2,1-2H3/t13-,16-/s2 Key: QTWQJTORJVFWAQ-AYSIPDSENA-N
- SMILES: A: O=C1OC2(C=C1C)C=3C=CC=C4NC=C(C43)CC2NC; B: O=C1OC2(C=C1C)C=3C=CC=C4NC=C(C43)CC2NC

Properties
Chemical formula	C_{16}H_{16}N_{2}O_{2}
Molar mass	268.316 g·mol^{−1}
- Except where otherwise noted, data are given for materials in their standard state (at 25 °C [77 °F], 100 kPa). Infobox references

Rugulovasines are bio-active alkaloids made by Penicillium. Rugulovasine A and B bind strongly to the 5-HT_{1A}, 5-HT_{2A}, and 5-HT_{2C} receptors, but lack meaningful binding affinity towards the α_{1} adrenergic and dopamine receptors. Little is known about the in vivo activity of Rugulovasine A and B, although they have hypotensive effects in cats.
