= Spiculisporic acid =

Names
- IUPAC name 2-(1-Carboxyundecyl)-5-oxooxolane-2-carboxylic acid
- Other names 4,5-Dicarboxy-gamma-pentadecanolactone

Identifiers
CAS Number	469-77-2
3D model (JSmol)	Interactive image
ChemSpider	280019
PubChem CID	316426
UNII	DKW7X62M6X
CompTox Dashboard (EPA)	DTXSID70859380
- InChI: InChI=1S/C17H28O6/c1-2-3-4-5-6-7-8-9-10-13(15(19)20)17(16(21)22)12-11-14(18)23-17/h13H,2-12H2,1H3,(H,19,20)(H,21,22) Key: TUXHHVJPGQUPCF-UHFFFAOYSA-N
- SMILES: CCCCCCCCCCC(C(=O)O)C1(CCC(=O)O1)C(=O)O

Properties
Chemical formula	C_{17}H_{28}O_{6}
Molar mass	328.405 g·mol^{−1}
- Except where otherwise noted, data are given for materials in their standard state (at 25 °C [77 °F], 100 kPa). Infobox references

Spiculisporic acid is a bioactive γ-butenolide. It was originally isolated from Penicillium spiculisporum. Structural variants have been isolated from a marine Aspergillus.
