= Spiropreussione =

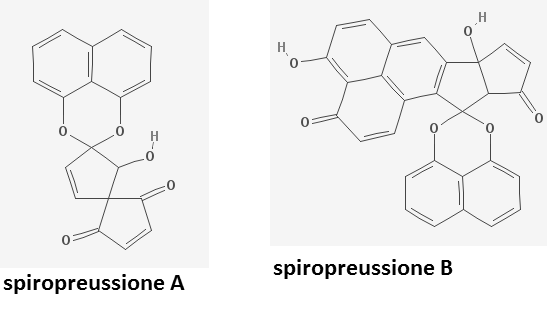
Spiropreussione A & B.png

Spiropreussiones are bio-active Preussia isolates.
