= Topopyrone C =

Names
- Preferred IUPAC name 5,9,11-Trihydroxy-2-methyl-4H-anthra[1,2-b]pyran-4,7,12-trione

Identifiers
CAS Number	308368-85-6
3D model (JSmol)	Interactive image
ChEBI	CHEBI:66254
ChEMBL	ChEMBL400146
ChemSpider	8059936
PubChem CID	9884262
CompTox Dashboard (EPA)	DTXSID701045476
- InChI: InChI=1S/C18H10O7/c1-6-2-10(20)15-12(22)5-9-14(18(15)25-6)17(24)13-8(16(9)23)3-7(19)4-11(13)21/h2-5,19,21-22H,1H3 Key: AWDAPFGGFWZKGB-UHFFFAOYSA-N
- SMILES: CC1=CC(=O)C2=C(C=C3C(=C2O1)C(=O)C4=C(C=C(C=C4C3=O)O)O)O

Properties
Chemical formula	C_{18}H_{10}O_{7}
Molar mass	338.271 g·mol^{−1}
- Except where otherwise noted, data are given for materials in their standard state (at 25 °C [77 °F], 100 kPa). Infobox references

Topopyrone C and its analogs are fungal isolates with anticancer activity in vitro.
