= Arisugacin A =

Names
- Preferred IUPAC name (4aR,6aR,12aS,12bS)-9-(3,4-Dimethoxyphenyl)-4a,12a-dihydroxy-4,4,6a,12b-tetramethyl-4a,6,6a,12,12a,12b-hexahydro-4H,11H-naphtho[2,1-b]pyrano[3,4-e]pyran-1,11(5H)-dione

Identifiers
CAS Number	167114-89-8
3D model (JSmol)	Interactive image
ChEBI	CHEBI:65435
ChEMBL	ChEMBL283509
ChemSpider	8430760
PubChem CID	10255275
CompTox Dashboard (EPA)	DTXSID401045615
- InChI: InChI=1S/C28H32O8/c1-24(2)10-9-22(29)26(4)27(24,31)12-11-25(3)28(26,32)15-17-20(36-25)14-19(35-23(17)30)16-7-8-18(33-5)21(13-16)34-6/h7-10,13-14,31-32H,11-12,15H2,1-6H3/t25-,26+,27-,28-/m1/s1 Key: MIHBCQWIBJDVPX-JUDWXZBOSA-N; InChI=1/C28H32O8/c1-24(2)10-9-22(29)26(4)27(24,31)12-11-25(3)28(26,32)15-17-20(36-25)14-19(35-23(17)30)16-7-8-18(33-5)21(13-16)34-6/h7-10,13-14,31-32H,11-12,15H2,1-6H3/t25-,26+,27-,28-/m1/s1 Key: MIHBCQWIBJDVPX-JUDWXZBOBZ
- SMILES: C[C@@]12CC[C@@]3([C@@]([C@]1(CC4=C(O2)C=C(OC4=O)C5=CC(=C(C=C5)OC)OC)O)(C(=O)C=CC3(C)C)C)O

Properties
Chemical formula	C_{28}H_{32}O_{8}
Molar mass	496.556 g·mol^{−1}
- Except where otherwise noted, data are given for materials in their standard state (at 25 °C [77 °F], 100 kPa). Infobox references

Arisugacin A is an orally active acetylcholinesterase inhibitor.
