= Emericellopsis =

Scientific classification
- Kingdom: Fungi
- Division: Ascomycota
- Class: Sordariomycetes
- Order: Hypocreales
- Family: incertae sedis
- Genus: Emericellopsis; J.F.H.Beyma (1940)

Type species
- Emericellopsis terricola J.F.H.Beyma (1940)

Synonyms
- Peyronellula Malan (1952); Saturnomyces Cain (1956)

Genus of fungi

Emericellopsis is a genus of fungi in the order Hypocreales. The relationship of this taxon to other taxa within the order is unknown (incertae sedis), and it has not yet been placed with certainty into any family.

== Species ==
- Emericellopsis alkalina Bilanenko (2013)
- Emericellopsis cladophorae M.Gonçalves, T.Vicente & A.Alves (2019)
- Emericellopsis donezkii Beliakova (1974)
- Emericellopsis enteromorphae M.Gonçalves, T.Vicente & A.Alves (2019)
- Emericellopsis glabra (J.F.H.Beyma) Backus & Orpurt (1962)
- Emericellopsis humicola (Cain) Cain ex Grosklags & Swift (1957)
- Emericellopsis koreana Hyang B.Lee, S.J.Jeon & T.T.T.Nguyen (2019)
- Emericellopsis maritima Beliakova (1970)
- Emericellopsis microspora Backus & Orpurt (1962)
- Emericellopsis minima Stolk (1955)
- Emericellopsis mirabilis (Malan) Stolk (1955)
- Emericellopsis pallida Beliakova (1974)
- Emericellopsis persica Papizadeh, Wijayaw., Soudi & K.D.Hyde (2016)
- Emericellopsis phycophila M.Gonçalves, T.Vicente & A.Alves (2019)
- Emericellopsis pusilla P.N.Mathur, Sukapure & Thirum. (1963)
- Emericellopsis robusta Emden & W.Gams (1971)
- Emericellopsis salmosynnemata Grosklags & Swift (1957)
- Emericellopsis sphaerospora Udagawa & Furuya (1988)
- Emericellopsis stolkiae D.E.Davidson & M.Chr. (1971)
- Emericellopsis synnematicola P.N.Mathur & Thirum. (1961)
- Emericellopsis terricola J.F.H.Beyma (1940)
