= Penochalasin A =

Names
- IUPAC name (2R,5S,6R,7S,8R,10S,11R,12E,15S,16E)-5-(1H-indol-3-ylmethyl)-7,8,15,17-tetramethyl-9-oxa-4,23-diazapentacyclo[18.2.1.0^{2,6}.0^{2,11}.0^{8,10}]tricosa-1(22),12,16,20-tetraene-3,18,19-trione

Identifiers
| CAS Number | 173792-70-6 |
| 3D model (JSmol) | Interactive image |
| ChEBI | CHEBI:68806 |
| ChEMBL | ChEMBL505879 |
| ChemSpider | 10251197 |
| PubChem CID | 44575229 |
- InChI: InChI=1S/C33H35N3O4/c1-17-8-7-10-22-30-32(4,40-30)19(3)27-25(15-20-16-34-23-11-6-5-9-21(20)23)36-31(39)33(22,27)26-13-12-24(35-26)29(38)28(37)18(2)14-17/h5-7,9-14,16-17,19,22,25,27,30,34-35H,8,15H2,1-4H3,(H,36,39)/b10-7+,18-14+/t17-,19-,22-,25-,27-,30-,32+,33+/m0/s1 Key: VOLUCNCCBUTEQO-KOHYOEEMSA-N
- SMILES: C[C@H]\1C/C=C/[C@H]2[C@H]3[C@](O3)([C@H]([C@@H]4[C@@]2(C5=CC=C(N5)C(=O)C(=O)/C(=C1)/C)C(=O)N[C@H]4CC6=CNC7=CC=CC=C76)C)C

Properties
| Chemical formula | C_{32}H_{35}N_{3}O_{3} |
| Molar mass | 509.650 g·mol^{−1} |
- Except where otherwise noted, data are given for materials in their standard state (at 25 °C [77 °F], 100 kPa). Infobox references

Penochalasin A is a cytotoxic alkaloid produced by Penicillium species.
