= Retigeric acid B =

Names
- IUPAC name 2α,3β-Dihydroxy-13,17-dimethyl-26,28-dinor-8α,13α,14β,17α,18β-hopane-23,25-dicarboxylic acid
- Systematic IUPAC name (3R,3aR,5aR,5bR,7aR,8S,9R,10R,11aR,13aS,13bR)-9,10-Dihydroxy-3a,5a,8,13a-tetramethyl-3-(propan-2-yl)-1,2,3,3a,4,5,5a,5b,6,7,7a,8,9,10,11,13,13a,13b-octadecahydro-11aH-cyclopenta[a]chrysene-8,11a-dicarboxylic acid

Identifiers
| CAS Number | 38327-77-4 |
| 3D model (JSmol) | Interactive image |
| ChEMBL | ChEMBL1629725 |
| ChemSpider | 26381416 |
| PubChem CID | 53319374 |
| UNII | 5M66ARA2BR |
| CompTox Dashboard (EPA) | DTXSID001336062 |
- InChI: InChI=1S/C30H46O6/c1-16(2)17-7-9-21-26(17,3)13-14-27(4)18-8-10-22-29(6,24(33)34)23(32)20(31)15-30(22,25(35)36)19(18)11-12-28(21,27)5/h11,16-18,20-23,31-32H,7-10,12-15H2,1-6H3,(H,33,34)(H,35,36)/t17-,18+,20-,21-,22+,23+,26-,27-,28+,29+,30+/m1/s1 Key: XVMVGCGRZAZPIF-QOYIRNJZSA-N
- SMILES: CC(C)[C@H]1CC[C@@H]2[C@@]1(CC[C@]3([C@]2(CC=C4[C@@H]3CC[C@@H]5[C@@]4(C[C@H]([C@@H]([C@@]5(C)C(=O)O)O)O)C(=O)O)C)C)C

Properties
| Chemical formula | C_{30}H_{46}O_{6} |
| Molar mass | 502.692 g·mol^{−1} |
- Except where otherwise noted, data are given for materials in their standard state (at 25 °C [77 °F], 100 kPa). Infobox references

Retigeric acid B is a hopanoids chemical compound isolated from Lobaria.
