= Fellutanine =

Alkaloid

Fellutanines A,B,C and D

Fellutanine A, B, C and D are bio-active diketopiperazine alkaloids isolated from the cultures of Penicillium fellutanum, that belongs to a class of naturally occurring 2,5-diketopiperazines. Originally they were thought to be based on the "trans" cyclic dipetide cyclo(L-Trp-D-Trp) but were later shown to be based on the "cis" cyclic dipetide cyclo(L-Trp-L-Trp). This was also confirmed when fellutanine A, B and C were isolated from Penicillium simplicissimum. The fellutanines A−C, are non-annulated analogues of cyclo(L-Trp-L-Trp), but unlike their diannulated analogue fellutanine D are not cytotoxic.
