= Vermiculine =

Names
- IUPAC name (3E,8S,11E,16S)-8,16-Bis(2-oxopropyl)-1,9-dioxacyclohexadeca-3,11-diene-2,5,10,13-tetrone

Identifiers
CAS Number	37244-00-1
3D model (JSmol)	Interactive image
ChemSpider	9276391
PubChem CID	11101249
UNII	97659Z75CN
- InChI: InChI=1S/C20H24O8/c1-13(21)11-17-7-3-15(23)6-10-20(26)28-18(12-14(2)22)8-4-16(24)5-9-19(25)27-17/h5-6,9-10,17-18H,3-4,7-8,11-12H2,1-2H3/b9-5+,10-6+/t17-,18-/m0/s1 Key: CFDVIOQSLRJWSU-OFBGZIBBSA-N; InChI=1S/C20H24O8/c1-13(21)11-17-7-3-15(23)6-10-20(26)28-18(12-14(2)22)8-4-16(24)5-9-19(25)27-17/h5-6,9-10,17-18H,3-4,7-8,11-12H2,1-2H3/b9-5+,10-6+/t17-,18-/m0/s1 Key: CFDVIOQSLRJWSU-OFBGZIBBSA-N
- SMILES: CC(=O)C[C@@H]1CCC(=O)/C=C/C(=O)O[C@H](CC(C)=O)CCC(=O)/C=C/C(=O)O1

Properties
Chemical formula	C_{20}H_{24}O_{8}
Molar mass	392.404 g·mol^{−1}
- Except where otherwise noted, data are given for materials in their standard state (at 25 °C [77 °F], 100 kPa). Infobox references

Vermiculine is an antibiotic isolate of Penicillium vermiculatum.
