= Terreulactone A =

Names
- IUPAC name (1R,4R,13R,14R,16R)-13-hydroxy-16-methoxy-8-(4-methoxyphenyl)-4,14,19,19-tetramethyl-5,9,18-trioxapentacyclo[14.2.1.0^{1,14}.0^{4,13}.0_{6,11}]nonadeca-6(11),7-diene-10,15,17-trione

Identifiers
CAS Number	443882-57-3
3D model (JSmol)	Interactive image
ChEMBL	ChEMBL183507
ChemSpider	23247880
PubChem CID	44391786
- InChI: InChI=1S/C28H30O9/c1-23(2)27-12-11-24(3)26(32,25(27,4)21(30)28(23,34-6)22(31)37-27)14-17-19(36-24)13-18(35-20(17)29)15-7-9-16(33-5)10-8-15/h7-10,13,32H,11-12,14H2,1-6H3/t24-,25-,26+,27-,28-/m1/s1 Key: AOFMVUCAUSHJLI-RKFAPSRVSA-N
- SMILES: C[C@@]12CC[C@]34[C@@]([C@@]1(CC5=C(O2)C=C(OC5=O)C6=CC=C(C=C6)OC)O)(C(=O)[C@](C3(C)C)(C(=O)O4)OC)C

Properties
Chemical formula	C_{28}H_{30}O_{9}
Molar mass	510.539 g·mol^{−1}
- Except where otherwise noted, data are given for materials in their standard state (at 25 °C [77 °F], 100 kPa). Infobox references

Terreulactone A is a meroterpenoid isolate of Aspergillus with anti-acetylcholinesterase activity.
