= Yaequinolone J1 =

Names
- IUPAC name (2S,9R,10R)-10-Hydroxy-9-methoxy-10-(4-methoxyphenyl)-2-methyl-2-(4-methyl-3-penten-1-yl)-2,7,9,10-tetrahydro-8H-pyrano[2,3-f]quinolin-8-one

Identifiers
3D model (JSmol)	Interactive image
ChEBI	CHEBI:215148
ChemSpider	9830053
PubChem CID	11655315
CompTox Dashboard (EPA)	DTXSID701028416
- InChI: InChI=1S/C27H31NO5/c1-17(2)7-6-15-26(3)16-14-18-8-13-21-22(23(18)33-26)27(30,24(32-5)25(29)28-21)19-9-11-20(31-4)12-10-19/h7-14,16,24,30H,6,15H2,1-5H3,(H,28,29)/t24-,26-,27+/m0/s1 Key: CPWPNTRWIIAFEG-DOEKTCAHSA-N
- SMILES: O=C4Nc2c(c1O[C@@](/C=C\c1cc2)(C)CC\C=C(/C)C)[C@](O)(c3ccc(OC)cc3)[C@H]4OC

Properties
Chemical formula	C_{27}H_{31}NO_{5}
Molar mass	449.547 g·mol^{−1}
- Except where otherwise noted, data are given for materials in their standard state (at 25 °C [77 °F], 100 kPa). Infobox references

Yaequinolone J1 is an antibiotic made by Penicillium.

== Total syntheses of yaequinolone J1 ==
An asymmetric total synthesis of yaequinolone J1 has been published in 2018 by V. Vece, S. Jakkepally and S. Hanessian. In 2020, a five-step synthesis of yaequinolone J1 was reported.
