= Citromycetin =

Names
- Preferred IUPAC name 8,9-Dihydroxy-2-methyl-4-oxo-4H,5H-pyrano[3,2-c][1]benzopyran-10-carboxylic acid

Identifiers
CAS Number	478-60-4
3D model (JSmol)	Interactive image
ChemSpider	58541
PubChem CID	65029
UNII	6LQ9JP1YA7
CompTox Dashboard (EPA)	DTXSID60197283
- InChI: InChI=1S/C14H10O7/c1-5-2-7(15)6-4-20-9-3-8(16)12(17)11(14(18)19)10(9)13(6)21-5/h2-3,16-17H,4H2,1H3,(H,18,19) Key: PKEPGKZPVDAVKI-UHFFFAOYSA-N; InChI=1/C14H10O7/c1-5-2-7(15)6-4-20-9-3-8(16)12(17)11(14(18)19)10(9)13(6)21-5/h2-3,16-17H,4H2,1H3,(H,18,19) Key: PKEPGKZPVDAVKI-UHFFFAOYAY
- SMILES: CC1=CC(=O)C2=C(O1)C3=C(C=C(C(=C3C(=O)O)O)O)OC2

Properties
Chemical formula	C_{14}H_{10}O_{7}
Molar mass	290.227 g·mol^{−1}
- Except where otherwise noted, data are given for materials in their standard state (at 25 °C [77 °F], 100 kPa). Infobox references

Citromycetin is a bio-active polyketide isolated from Australian Penicillium.
