= Duclauxin =

Identifiers
CAS Number	1732-37-2
3D model (JSmol)	Interactive image
ChemSpider	68003973
PubChem CID	10482567
UNII	Y76N2QE4RZ
- InChI: InChI=1S/C29H22O11/c1-9-5-14(32)18-20-15(9)23(34)21-25(40-11(3)30)28(20,8-39-27(18)36)24-22(33)12-7-38-26(35)17-13(31)6-10(2)19(16(12)17)29(21,24)37-4/h5-7,21,24-25,31-32H,8H2,1-4H3/t21-,24+,25+,28-,29+/m0/s1 Key: WBQDAYWQELBEPU-FTAQWXBTSA-N
- SMILES: CC1=CC(=C2C3=C1C(=O)[C@H]4[C@H]([C@]3(COC2=O)[C@@H]5[C@]4(C6=C7C(=COC(=O)C7=C(C=C6C)O)C5=O)OC)OC(=O)C)O

Properties
Chemical formula	C_{29}H_{22}O_{11}
Molar mass	546.484 g·mol^{−1}
- Except where otherwise noted, data are given for materials in their standard state (at 25 °C [77 °F], 100 kPa). Infobox references

Duclauxin is a chemical compound isolated from Penicillium duclauxi.

Other chemical compounds which are derivatives of duclauxin are known, such as cryptoclauxin, bacillisporins, and talaromycesones. They are sometimes referred to collectively as duclauxins.

Cryptoclauxin

Bacillisporin C

Bacillisporin F

Talaromycesone B
