= Fumiquinazoline =

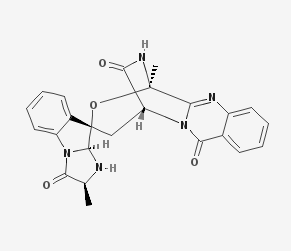
- Fumiquinazoline C

Identifiers
CAS Number	A: 140715-85-1; B: 140852-71-7; C: 140924-01-2; D: 140715-86-2; E: 140715-87-3; F 169626-35-1 I 278184-56-8
3D model (JSmol)	A: Interactive image; B: Interactive image; C: Interactive image; D: Interactive image; E: Interactive image
ChEBI	A: CHEBI:64546; C: CHEBI:64551
ChEMBL	A: ChEMBL2229120; D: ChEMBL2229119
ChemSpider	A: 9422835; B: 10216892; C: 9514662; D: 8156437; E: 8203481
KEGG	A: C22147; C: C22148; D: C22149
PubChem CID	A: 11247802; B: 15224332; C: 11339719; D: 9980845; E: 10027910
CompTox Dashboard (EPA)	A: DTXSID801017927; B: DTXSID101017926; C: DTXSID80893275; E: DTXSID401017937
- InChI: A: InChI=1S/C24H23N5O4/c1-12-19-27-16-9-5-3-7-14(16)22(32)28(19)18(20(30)25-12)11-24(33)15-8-4-6-10-17(15)29-21(31)13(2)26-23(24)29/h3-10,12-13,18,23,26,33H,11H2,1-2H3,(H,25,30)/t12-,13-,18+,23-,24-/m0/s1 Key: DQQCCKFZJNINST-VCPZKGNQSA-N; B: InChI=1S/C24H23N5O4/c1-12-19-27-16-9-5-3-7-14(16)22(32)28(19)18(20(30)25-12)11-24(33)15-8-4-6-10-17(15)29-21(31)13(2)26-23(24)29/h3-10,12-13,18,23,26,33H,11H2,1-2H3,(H,25,30)/t12-,13+,18-,23+,24+/m1/s1 Key: DQQCCKFZJNINST-ZRCGILORSA-N; C: InChI=1S/C24H21N5O4/c1-12-19(31)28-16-10-6-4-8-14(16)24(22(28)25-12)11-17-18(30)27-23(2,33-24)21-26-15-9-5-3-7-13(15)20(32)29(17)21/h3-10,12,17,22,25H,11H2,1-2H3,(H,27,30)/t12-,17+,22-,23-,24-/m0/s1 Key: POEYRUBMWIOMTB-LTQSKDJASA-N; D: InChI=1S/C24H21N5O4/c1-12-19(31)28-16-10-6-4-8-14(16)24(33)11-17-18(30)26-23(2,29(12)22(24)28)21-25-15-9-5-3-7-13(15)20(32)27(17)21/h3-10,12,17,22,33H,11H2,1-2H3,(H,26,30)/t12-,17+,22+,23-,24-/m0/s1 Key: YYLAARMDRFESOL-CVAYNVNESA-N; E: InChI=1S/C25H25N5O5/c1-13-20(32)29-17-11-7-5-9-15(17)25(34,23(29)26-13)12-18-19(31)28-24(2,35-3)22-27-16-10-6-4-8-14(16)21(33)30(18)22/h4-11,13,18,23,26,34H,12H2,1-3H3,(H,28,31)/t13-,18+,23-,24+,25-/m0/s1 Key: MUUBSMIWCJLEGK-HBLJGDDGSA-N
- SMILES: A: C[C@H]1C2=NC3=CC=CC=C3C(=O)N2[C@@H](C(=O)N1)C[C@]4([C@H]5N[C@H](C(=O)N5C6=CC=CC=C64)C)O; B: C[C@@H]1C2=NC3=CC=CC=C3C(=O)N2[C@@H](C(=O)N1)C[C@]4([C@H]5N[C@H](C(=O)N5C6=CC=CC=C64)C)O; C: C[C@H]1C(=O)N2[C@H](N1)[C@]3(C[C@@H]4C(=O)N[C@@](O3)(C5=NC6=CC=CC=C6C(=O)N45)C)C7=CC=CC=C72; D: C[C@H]1C(=O)N2[C@@H]3N1[C@]4(C5=NC6=CC=CC=C6C(=O)N5[C@H](C[C@@]3(C7=CC=CC=C72)O)C(=O)N4)C; E: C[C@H]1C(=O)N2[C@H](N1)[C@@](C3=CC=CC=C32)(C[C@@H]4C(=O)N[C@](C5=NC6=CC=CC=C6C(=O)N45)(C)OC)O
- Except where otherwise noted, data are given for materials in their standard state (at 25 °C [77 °F], 100 kPa). Infobox references

Fumiquinazolines are bio-active isolates of Aspergillus.
