= Aspergillusol A =

Names
- IUPAC name [(2S,3R)-2,3-Dihydroxy-4-[(2Z)-2-hydroxyimino-3-(4-hydroxyphenyl)propanoyl]oxybutyl] (2Z)-2-hydroxyimino-3-(4-hydroxyphenyl)propanoate

Identifiers
| CAS Number | 1190840-79-9 |
| 3D model (JSmol) | Interactive image |
| ChemSpider | 24667436 |
| PubChem CID | 44605528 |
| CompTox Dashboard (EPA) | DTXSID301045648 |
- InChI: InChI=1S/C22H24N2O10/c25-15-5-1-13(2-6-15)9-17(23-31)21(29)33-11-19(27)20(28)12-34-22(30)18(24-32)10-14-3-7-16(26)8-4-14/h1-8,19-20,25-28,31-32H,9-12H2/b23-17-,24-18-/t19-,20+ Key: BXRQJOBHKCDAJW-KMMADPOHSA-N; InChI=1/C22H24N2O10/c25-15-5-1-13(2-6-15)9-17(23-31)21(29)33-11-19(27)20(28)12-34-22(30)18(24-32)10-14-3-7-16(26)8-4-14/h1-8,19-20,25-28,31-32H,9-12H2/b23-17-,24-18-/t19-,20+ Key: BXRQJOBHKCDAJW-KMMADPOHBB
- SMILES: C1=CC(=CC=C1C/C(=N/O)/C(=O)OC[C@@H](O)[C@@H](O)COC(=O)/C(=N\O)/CC2=CC=C(C=C2)O)O

Properties
| Chemical formula | C_{22}H_{24}N_{2}O_{10} |
| Molar mass | 476.438 g·mol^{−1} |
- Except where otherwise noted, data are given for materials in their standard state (at 25 °C [77 °F], 100 kPa). Infobox references

Aspergillusol A is an alpha-glucosidase inhibitor isolated from marine Aspergillus. Structurally, it consists of an erythritol group in the center, with two hydroxyimino-phenylpropanoyl groups attached to it from either side. It was synthesized in 2010 by researchers from King Fahd University of Petroleum and Minerals, starting with 4-hydroxybenzaldehyde.
