= Trichodimerol =

Names
- Preferred IUPAC name (1S,3R,3aR,5Z,6R,7R,9Z,9aR,10R,12S)-3,10-Dihydroxy-5,9-bis[(2E,4E)-1-hydroxyhexa-2,4-dien-1-ylidene]-1,3a,7,12-tetramethylhexahydro-1,7,3,6-(epimethanetriyloxymethanetriyl)cycloocta[c]furan-4,8(1H,5H)-dione
- Other names (1S,3R,4R,6Z,7R,8S,10R,11R,13Z,14R)-3,10-dihydroxy-6,13-bis[(2E,4E)-1-hydroxyhexa-2,4-dienylidene]-1,4,8,11-tetramethyl-2,9-dioxapentacyclo[8.4.0.0^{3,8}.0^{4,14}.0^{7,11}]tetradecane-5,12-dione

Identifiers
CAS Number	145174-90-9
3D model (JSmol)	Interactive image
ChEBI	CHEBI:66261
ChEMBL	ChEMBL1643641; ChEMBL4466322
ChemSpider	27023003
PubChem CID	21778326
- InChI: InChI=1S/C28H32O8/c1-7-9-11-13-15(29)17-19-23(3)22(32)18(16(30)14-12-10-8-2)20-24(4,21(17)31)28(34)25(19,5)35-27(23,33)26(20,6)36-28/h7-14,19-20,29-30,33-34H,1-6H3/b9-7+,10-8+,13-11+,14-12+,17-15-,18-16-/t19-,20-,23-,24-,25+,26+,27-,28-/m1/s1 Key: OFOUJHGWJJEVMF-SZJYFORJSA-N
- SMILES: C/C=C/C=C/C(=C\1/C(=O)[C@@]2([C@]3(O[C@]4([C@@H]2/C(=C(/O)\C=C\C=C\C)/C(=O)[C@@]5([C@]4(O[C@]3([C@H]15)C)O)C)C)O)C)/O

Properties
Chemical formula	C_{28}H_{32}O_{8}
Molar mass	496.556 g·mol^{−1}
- Except where otherwise noted, data are given for materials in their standard state (at 25 °C [77 °F], 100 kPa). Infobox references

Trichodimerol is a bio-active pentacycle isolate of Trichoderma.
