= Sch 642305 =

Names
- Preferred IUPAC name (4S,8aR,12S,12aR)-12-Hydroxy-4-methyl-4,5,6,7,8,8a,12,12a-octahydro-2H-3-benzoxecine-2,9(1H)-dione

Identifiers
CAS Number	643747-04-0
3D model (JSmol)	Interactive image
ChEBI	CHEBI:66181
ChEMBL	ChEMBL453428
ChemSpider	552951
PubChem CID	637324
CompTox Dashboard (EPA)	DTXSID901045496
- InChI: InChI=1S/C14H20O4/c1-9-4-2-3-5-10-11(8-14(17)18-9)13(16)7-6-12(10)15/h6-7,9-11,13,16H,2-5,8H2,1H3/t9-,10+,11+,13-/m0/s1 Key: WTQWDNIIFGEBSZ-WGBDABJCSA-N)O
- SMILES: C[C@H]1CCCC[C@@H]2[C@@H](CC(=O)O1)[C@H](C=CC2=O)O

Properties
Chemical formula	C_{14}H_{20}O_{4}
Molar mass	252.310 g·mol^{−1}
- Except where otherwise noted, data are given for materials in their standard state (at 25 °C [77 °F], 100 kPa). Infobox references

Sch 642305 is a chemical compound isolated from Penicillium verrucosum that inhibits bacterial DNA primase.
