= Penostatin A =

Names
- Preferred IUPAC name (3S,4aR,8R,9aS,9bS)-8-Hydroxy-2-methyl-3-[(1E)-non-1-en-1-yl]-4a,7,8,9,9a,9b-hexahydroindeno[5,4-b]pyran-5(3H)-one

Identifiers
CAS Number	173485-70-6
3D model (JSmol)	Interactive image
ChemSpider	8490966
PubChem CID	10315501
UNII	JAQ4MH3LR5
CompTox Dashboard (EPA)	DTXSID801045467
- InChI: InChI=1S/C22H32O3/c1-3-4-5-6-7-8-9-10-21-15(2)11-19-18-14-17(23)12-16(18)13-20(24)22(19)25-21/h9-11,13,17-19,21-23H,3-8,12,14H2,1-2H3/b10-9+/t17-,18+,19-,21-,22+/m0/s1 Key: ONCGMAFAIBLDNP-GYGBFYAFSA-N; InChI=1/C22H32O3/c1-3-4-5-6-7-8-9-10-21-15(2)11-19-18-14-17(23)12-16(18)13-20(24)22(19)25-21/h9-11,13,17-19,21-23H,3-8,12,14H2,1-2H3/b10-9+/t17-,18+,19-,21-,22+/m0/s1 Key: ONCGMAFAIBLDNP-GYGBFYAFBS
- SMILES: O=C2/C=C1/C[C@H](O)C[C@H]1[C@@H]3/C=C(/C)[C@@H](O[C@@H]23)/C=C/CCCCCCC

Properties
Chemical formula	C_{22}H_{32}O_{3}
Molar mass	344.495 g·mol^{−1}
- Except where otherwise noted, data are given for materials in their standard state (at 25 °C [77 °F], 100 kPa). Infobox references

Penostatin A is a cytotoxic metabolite produced by Penicillium.
