= Alternariol =

Names
- Preferred IUPAC name 3,7,9-Trihydroxy-1-methyl-6H-dibenzo[b,d]pyran-6-one
- Other names 3,7,9-Trihydroxy-1-methyl-6H-benzo[c]chromen-6-one

Identifiers
CAS Number	641-38-3
3D model (JSmol)	Interactive image; Interactive image
ChEBI	CHEBI:64983
ChEMBL	ChEMBL519982
ChemSpider	4514301
ECHA InfoCard	100.164.145
KEGG	C16838
PubChem CID	5359485
UNII	KN9L4260JW
CompTox Dashboard (EPA)	DTXSID80214305
- InChI: InChI=1S/C14H10O5/c1-6-2-7(15)5-11-12(6)9-3-8(16)4-10(17)13(9)14(18)19-11/h2-5,15-17H,1H3 Key: CEBXXEKPIIDJHL-UHFFFAOYSA-N; InChI=1/C14H10O5/c1-6-2-7(15)5-11-12(6)9-3-8(16)4-10(17)13(9)14(18)19-11/h2-5,15-17H,1H3 Key: CEBXXEKPIIDJHL-UHFFFAOYAX
- SMILES: CC1=CC(=CC2=C1C3=CC(=CC(=C3C(=O)O2)O)O)O; Cc1cc(cc2c1c3cc(cc(c3c(=O)o2)O)O)O

Properties
Chemical formula	C_{14}H_{10}O_{5}
Molar mass	258.229 g·mol^{−1}
- Except where otherwise noted, data are given for materials in their standard state (at 25 °C [77 °F], 100 kPa). verify (what is ?) Infobox references

Alternariol (commonly abbreviated as AOH) is a toxic metabolite of Alternaria fungi. It is an important contaminant in cereals and fruits. Alternariol exhibits antifungal and phytotoxic activity. It is reported to inhibit cholinesterase enzymes. It is also a mycoestrogen.

A 2017 in vitro assay study reported alternariol to be a full androgen agonist.

The acute toxicity of AOH and AME is low, but in vitro the substances show a strong mutagenic and teratogenic effect. The substances are associated with the development of esophageal cancer.
