= Ternatin heptapeptide =

Identifiers
CAS Number	148619-41-4
3D model (JSmol)	Interactive image; (natural): Interactive image
ChemSpider	167002; (natural): 9882259
PubChem CID	192406; (natural): 11707536
UNII	4LHU5T3Z44
CompTox Dashboard (EPA)	DTXSID20933442
- InChI: InChI=1S/C37H67N7O8/c1-16-22(8)28-37(52)43(14)25(11)35(50)44(15)27(18-20(4)5)32(47)38-26(17-19(2)3)36(51)42(13)24(10)34(49)41(12)23(9)31(46)40-29(33(48)39-28)30(45)21(6)7/h19-30,45H,16-18H2,1-15H3,(H,38,47)(H,39,48)(H,40,46) Key: ZMFVAIFXJWEOMH-UHFFFAOYSA-N; (natural): InChI=1S/C37H67N7O8/c1-16-22(8)28-37(52)43(14)25(11)35(50)44(15)27(18-20(4)5)32(47)38-26(17-19(2)3)36(51)42(13)24(10)34(49)41(12)23(9)31(46)40-29(33(48)39-28)30(45)21(6)7/h19-30,45H,16-18H2,1-15H3,(H,38,47)(H,39,48)(H,40,46)/t22-,23+,24-,25-,26-,27-,28+,29+,30+/m0/s1 Key: ZMFVAIFXJWEOMH-PTPSPKLBSA-N
- SMILES: CCC(C)C1C(=O)N(C(C(=O)N(C(C(=O)NC(C(=O)N(C(C(=O)N(C(C(=O)NC(C(=O)N1)C(C(C)C)O)C)C)C)C)CC(C)C)CC(C)C)C)C)C; (natural): CC[C@H](C)[C@H]1NC(=O)[C@@H]([C@H](O)C(C)C)NC(=O)[C@@H](C)N(C)C(=O)[C@H](C)N(C)C(=O)[C@H](CC(C)C)NC(=O)[C@H](CC(C)C)N(C)C(=O)[C@H](C)N(C)C1=O

Properties
Chemical formula	C_{37}H_{67}N_{7}O_{8}
Molar mass	737.984 g·mol^{−1}
- Except where otherwise noted, data are given for materials in their standard state (at 25 °C [77 °F], 100 kPa). Infobox references

Ternatin is a mushroom heptapeptide that suppresses hyperglycemia in vivo.
