= Sorbicillactone A =

Names
- Systematic IUPAC name (2E)-4-({(3S,3aR,4Z,7aS)-5-Hydroxy-4-[(2E,4E)-1-hydroxyhexa-2,4-dien-1-ylidene]-3,6,7a-trimethyl-2,7-dioxo-2,3,3a,4,7,7a-hexahydro-1-benzofuran-3-yl}amino)-4-oxobut-2-enoic acid

Identifiers
CAS Number	664987-12-6
3D model (JSmol)	Interactive image
ChemSpider	10480732
PubChem CID	5279576
- InChI: InChI=1S/C21H23NO8/c1-5-6-7-8-12(23)15-16(27)11(2)18(28)21(4)17(15)20(3,19(29)30-21)22-13(24)9-10-14(25)26/h5-10,17,23,28H,1-4H3,(H,22,24)(H,25,26)/b6-5+,8-7+,10-9+,15-12+/t17-,20+,21+/m1/s1 Key: WVVJWXDENDJFEC-CVHNVBPNSA-N; InChI=1/C21H23NO8/c1-5-6-7-8-12(23)15-16(27)11(2)18(28)21(4)17(15)20(3,19(29)30-21)22-13(24)9-10-14(25)26/h5-10,17,23,28H,1-4H3,(H,22,24)(H,25,26)/b6-5+,8-7+,10-9+,15-12+/t17-,20+,21+/m1/s1 Key: WVVJWXDENDJFEC-CVHNVBPNBC
- SMILES: C/C=C/C=C/C(=C/1\[C@H]2[C@@](C(=O)C(=C1O)C)(OC(=O)[C@@]2(C)NC(=O)/C=C/C(=O)O)C)/O

Properties
Chemical formula	C_{21}H_{23}NO_{8}
Molar mass	417.414 g·mol^{−1}
- Except where otherwise noted, data are given for materials in their standard state (at 25 °C [77 °F], 100 kPa). Infobox references

Sorbicillactone A is a bio-active isolate of a sponge-derived fungus.
