= Questiomycin A =

Names
- Preferred IUPAC name 2-Amino-3H-phenoxazin-3-one

Identifiers
CAS Number	1916-59-2
3D model (JSmol)	Interactive image
ChEBI	CHEBI:17293
ChEMBL	ChEMBL146710
ChemSpider	65565
KEGG	C02161
PubChem CID	72725
UNII	J4CM69VF7H
CompTox Dashboard (EPA)	DTXSID60172691
- InChI: InChI=1S/C12H8N2O2/c13-7-5-9-12(6-10(7)15)16-11-4-2-1-3-8(11)14-9/h1-6H,13H2 Key: RDJXPXHQENRCNG-UHFFFAOYSA-N; InChI=1/C12H8N2O2/c13-7-5-9-12(6-10(7)15)16-11-4-2-1-3-8(11)14-9/h1-6H,13H2 Key: RDJXPXHQENRCNG-UHFFFAOYAN
- SMILES: C1=CC=C2C(=C1)N=C3C=C(C(=O)C=C3O2)N

Properties
Chemical formula	C_{12}H_{8}N_{2}O_{2}
Molar mass	212.208 g·mol^{−1}
- Except where otherwise noted, data are given for materials in their standard state (at 25 °C [77 °F], 100 kPa). Infobox references

Questiomycin A is an antibiotic made by the fungus Penicillium expansum.

== See also ==
- Xantocillin
