= Irofulven =

Names
- Preferred IUPAC name (6′R)-6′-Hydroxy-3′-(hydroxymethyl)-2′,4′,6′-trimethylspiro[cyclopropane-1,5′-inden]-7′(6′H)-one

Identifiers
| CAS Number | 158440-71-2 |
| 3D model (JSmol) | Interactive image |
| ChEMBL | ChEMBL118218 |
| ChemSpider | 130640 |
| KEGG | D04614 |
| PubChem CID | 148189 |
| UNII | 6B799IH05A |
| CompTox Dashboard (EPA) | DTXSID50166423 |
- InChI: InChI=1S/C15H18O3/c1-8-6-10-12(11(8)7-16)9(2)15(4-5-15)14(3,18)13(10)17/h6,16,18H,4-5,7H2,1-3H3/t14-/m0/s1 Key: NICJCIQSJJKZAH-AWEZNQCLSA-N; InChI=1/C15H18O3/c1-8-6-10-12(11(8)7-16)9(2)15(4-5-15)14(3,18)13(10)17/h6,16,18H,4-5,7H2,1-3H3/t14-/m0/s1 Key: NICJCIQSJJKZAH-AWEZNQCLBL
- SMILES: O=C1C/3=C/C(=C(C\3=C(/C2([C@]1(O)C)CC2)C)CO)C

Properties
| Chemical formula | C_{15}H_{18}O_{3} |
| Molar mass | 246.302 g/mol |
| Density | 1.285 g/mL |
- Except where otherwise noted, data are given for materials in their standard state (at 25 °C [77 °F], 100 kPa). verify (what is ?) Infobox references

Irofulven or 6-hydroxymethylacylfulvene (also known as HMAF and MGI-114) is an experimental cancer drug. It belongs to the family of drugs called alkylating agents.

It inhibits the DNA replication of cultured cells deficient in the nucleotide excision repair pathway.

Irofulven is an analogue of illudin S, a sesquiterpene toxin found in the Jack 'o' Lantern mushroom (Omphalotus illudens). The compound was originally synthesized by Dr. Trevor McMorris and found to have anticancer properties in mice by Dr. Michael J Kelner.

== Licensing and Clinical development ==
The drug was created and patented by the University of California, San Diego (UCSD), and subsequently licensed to the US biotech company MGI Pharma. Eisai acquired MGI in 2007, and the license was returned to UCSD, which then re-licensed the potential cancer drug to Lantern Pharma in 2015. Soon after, the drug was again sub-licensed to Oncology Venture, now known as Allarty Therapeutics A/S.

The drug has undergone a number of clinical trials, mostly for late-stage tumors as well as ovarian and prostate cancers, usually preceded by treatment with carboplatin and paclitaxel. A multi-center phase 2 trial involving patients with Recurrent or Persistent Ovarian Epithelial or Primary Peritoneal Cancer was well tolerated but irofluven demonstrated modest activity as a single agent. Previously, a European Phase I study in combination with cisplatin showed substantial evidence for anti-tumor activity. In that study, irofulven showed rapid elimination and high interpatient variability. Platinum and irofulven pharmacokinetics did not suggest drug-drug interactions.

Despite modest successes demonstrating limited efficacy for late stage tumors that were statistically not significant enough to support broader clinical trials, Allarty decided to stratify patient populations with companion diagnostic tools (biomarkers) to predict outcomes, and thus select that sub-set of patients through DRP (Drug Response Predictors), for whom treatment with irofulven would be most effective. Allarty initiated two Phase 2 drug-screening studies at two Danish University Hospitals for late-stage prostate cancers, wherein 300 patients have been included to be screened, of which only 27 are to be selected for the Phase 2 trial. In 2021, Lantern Pharma reacquired the rights to the development and commercialization of irofulven. At that time, 9 of the intended 27 patients had been a part of the study which saw an increase of median overall survival from 2.6 to 5.4 months. The study was still ongoing as of late 2024.

Since it was first synthesized, research with irofulven has decreased dramatically over the past decade with only one clinical trial currently being run. A study published in 2021 showed cells with nucleotide excision repair (NER) deficiencies were susceptible to iroflaven while cells without these NER deficiencies were not overly affected. The deficiency of tumors in NER was seen as a potential identifier for patient candidates. Since this discovery, research has increased with researchers calling irofulven a "previously abandoned" anticancer drug.

== Synthesis ==
A synthesis of irofulven has been reported.

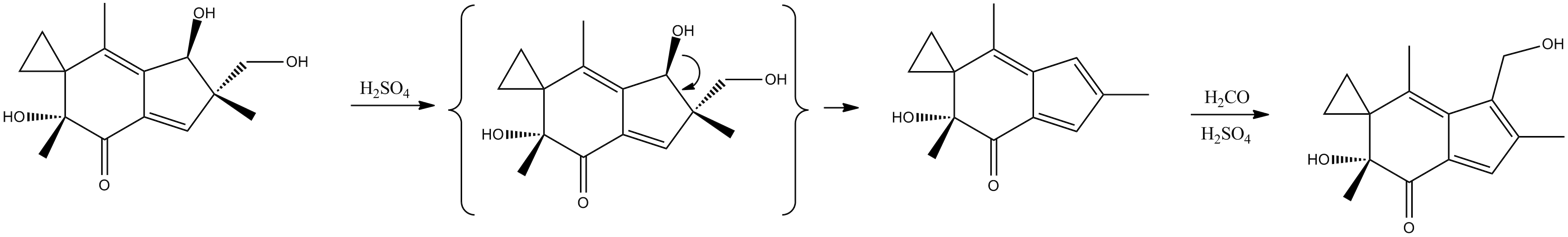

== Mechanism ==
Using the AP-site-sequencing method click-code-seq, researchers from ETH Zurich found that irofulven-induced DNA modifications accumulate predominantly in AA dimers and promoters as well as non-transcribed strands of genes, which likely reflects the action of TC-NER.
