= Citromycin =

Names
- Preferred IUPAC name 8,9-Dihydroxy-2-methyl-4H,5H-pyrano[3,2-c][1]benzopyran-4-one

Identifiers
CAS Number	37209-30-6
3D model (JSmol)	Interactive image
ChemSpider	2341687
PubChem CID	3084655
UNII	3V8ST5MC5Z
CompTox Dashboard (EPA)	DTXSID10190704
- InChI: InChI=1S/C13H10O5/c1-6-2-9(14)8-5-17-12-4-11(16)10(15)3-7(12)13(8)18-6/h2-4,15-16H,5H2,1H3 Key: QZZUHPUWIRSQPB-UHFFFAOYSA-N; InChI=1/C13H10O5/c1-6-2-9(14)8-5-17-12-4-11(16)10(15)3-7(12)13(8)18-6/h2-4,15-16H,5H2,1H3 Key: QZZUHPUWIRSQPB-UHFFFAOYAO
- SMILES: CC1=CC(=O)C2=C(O1)C3=CC(=C(C=C3OC2)O)O

Properties
Chemical formula	C_{13}H_{10}O_{5}
Molar mass	246.218 g·mol^{−1}
- Except where otherwise noted, data are given for materials in their standard state (at 25 °C [77 °F], 100 kPa). Infobox references

Citromycin is a chemical compound produced by Penicillium. It was first discovered in 1969 and was found to have weak antibiotic activity.
