= Botryodiplodin =

Names
- IUPAC name 1-((3S,4S)-5-Hydroxy-4-methyloxolan-3-yl)ethanone
- Other names (-)-Botryodiplodin

Identifiers
CAS Number	27098-03-9
3D model (JSmol)	Interactive image
ChEBI	CHEBI:168857
ChEMBL	ChEMBL2007203
ChemSpider	9427105
PubChem CID	11252078
UNII	5G35Q22R8M
CompTox Dashboard (EPA)	DTXSID50949859
- InChI: InChI=1S/C7H12O3/c1-4-6(5(2)8)3-10-7(4)9/h4,6-7,9H,3H2,1-2H3/t4-,6-,7?/m1/s1 Key: CLYSZQBIUYRLNX-WETFRILZSA-N
- SMILES: C(C)(=O)[C@H]1[C@@H](C)C(O)OC1

Properties
Chemical formula	C_{7}H_{12}O_{3}
Molar mass	144.170 g·mol^{−1}
- Except where otherwise noted, data are given for materials in their standard state (at 25 °C [77 °F], 100 kPa). Infobox references

Botryodiplodin is an antibiotic mycotoxin produced by Penicillium.
