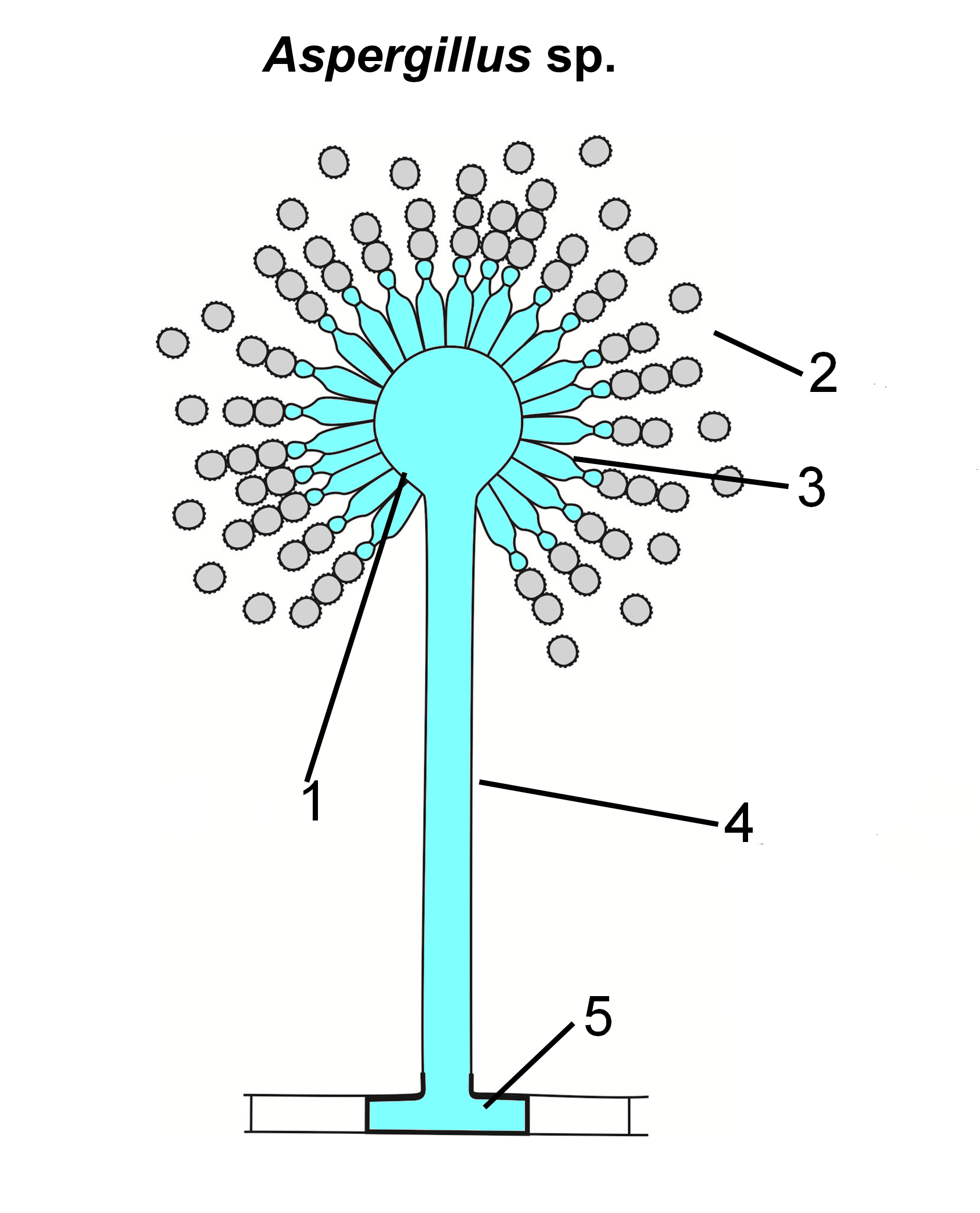
- Aspergillus - morphology

Scientific classification
- Kingdom: Fungi
- Division: Ascomycota
- Class: Eurotiomycetes
- Order: Eurotiales
- Family: Aspergillaceae
- Genus: Aspergillus
- Species: A. stellatus

Binomial name
- Aspergillus stellatus Curzi (1934)

= Aspergillus stellatus =

Species of fungus

Aspergillus stellatus is a species of fungus in the genus Aspergillus. It is from the Nidulantes section. The species was first described in 1934. It has been isolated from soil in Panama and seeds in India. It has been reported in human infections. It has been reported to produce aflatoxin B1, ajamxanthone, shamixanthone, tajixanthone, tajixanthone hydrate, tajixanthone methanoate, 19-O-methyl-22- methoxypre-shamixanthone, pre-shamixanthone, 15- acetyltajixanthone hydrate, andibenin A, andibenin B, andibenin C, andelesin A, andelesin B, anditomin, arugosin A, arugosin B, arugosin D, asperthecin, astellatol, asteltoxin, desferritriacetylfusigen, dihydroterrein, emervaridione, varioxiranediol, epiisoshamixanthone, ophiobolin C, ophiobolin G, ophiobolin H, ophiobolin K, evariquinone, 2-Furanoic acid, islandicin, isoemericellin, kojic acid, 2-Methoxy-6-(3,4-dihydroxy-hepta-1,5-dienyl)benzyl alcohol, najamxanthone, radixanthone, shahenxanthone, penicillin G, shimalactone A, siderin, stellatic acid, stellatin, stromemycin, terrein, variecoacetal A, variecoacetal B, variecolactone, variecolin, varioxirane, varixanthone, varitriol, and varioxranol A-G.
