= C16H12O6 =

The molecular formula C_{16}H_{12}O_{6} (molar mass : 300.26 g/mol, exact mass : 300.063388) may refer to:

- Chrysoeriol, a flavone
- Diosmetin, a flavone
- Evariquinone, an anthraquinone
- Fallacinol, an anthraquinone
- Hematein, an oxidized derivative of haematoxylin used in staining
- Hispidulin, a flavone
- Kalafungin, an antibiotic
- Kaempferide, a flavonol
- Leptosidin, an aurone
- Pratensein, an isoflavone
- Psi-tectorigenin, an isoflavone
- Tectorigenin, an isoflavone
- Teloschistin, an anthraquinone
