= Aspergillus aurantiobrunneus =

Scientific classification
- Kingdom: Fungi
- Division: Ascomycota
- Class: Eurotiomycetes
- Order: Eurotiales
- Family: Aspergillaceae
- Genus: Aspergillus
- Species: A. aurantiobrunneus

Binomial name
- Aspergillus aurantiobrunneus (G.A. Atkins, Hindson & A.B. Russell) Raper & Fennell (1965)

Species of fungus

Aspergillus aurantiobrunneus is a species of fungus in the genus Aspergillus. It is from the Nidulantes section. The species was first described in 1965. It has been reported to produce emeremophiline, emericolin A-D, variecolin, variecolol, desferritriacetylfusigen, sterigmatocystin, variecoacetals A and B, variecolactone, and variecolin.

== Growth and morphology ==
A. aurantiobrunneus has been cultivated on both Czapek yeast extract agar (CYA) plates and Malt Extract Agar Oxoid (MEAOX) plates. The growth morphology of the colonies can be seen in the pictures below.

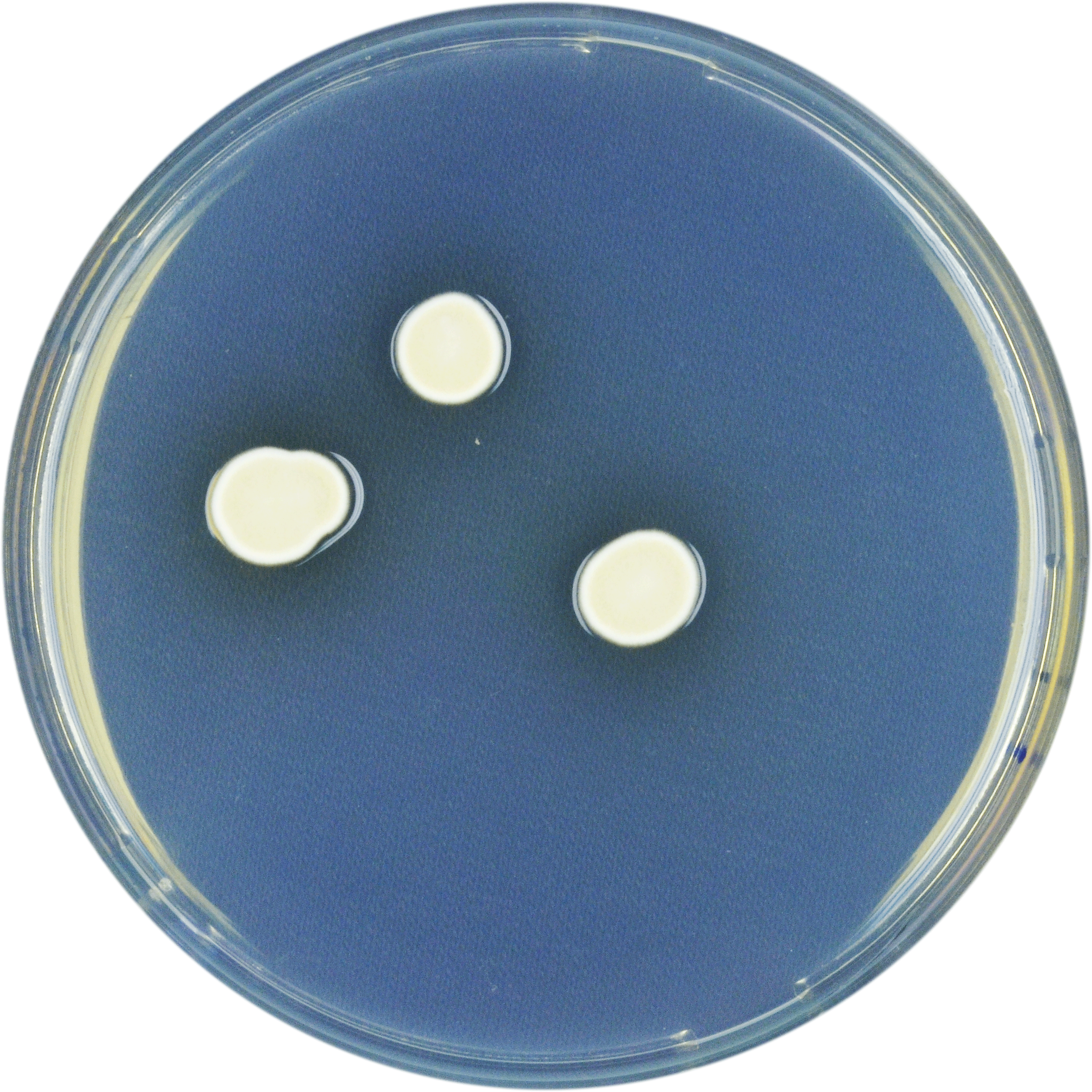
Aspergillus aurantiobrunneus growing on CYA plate

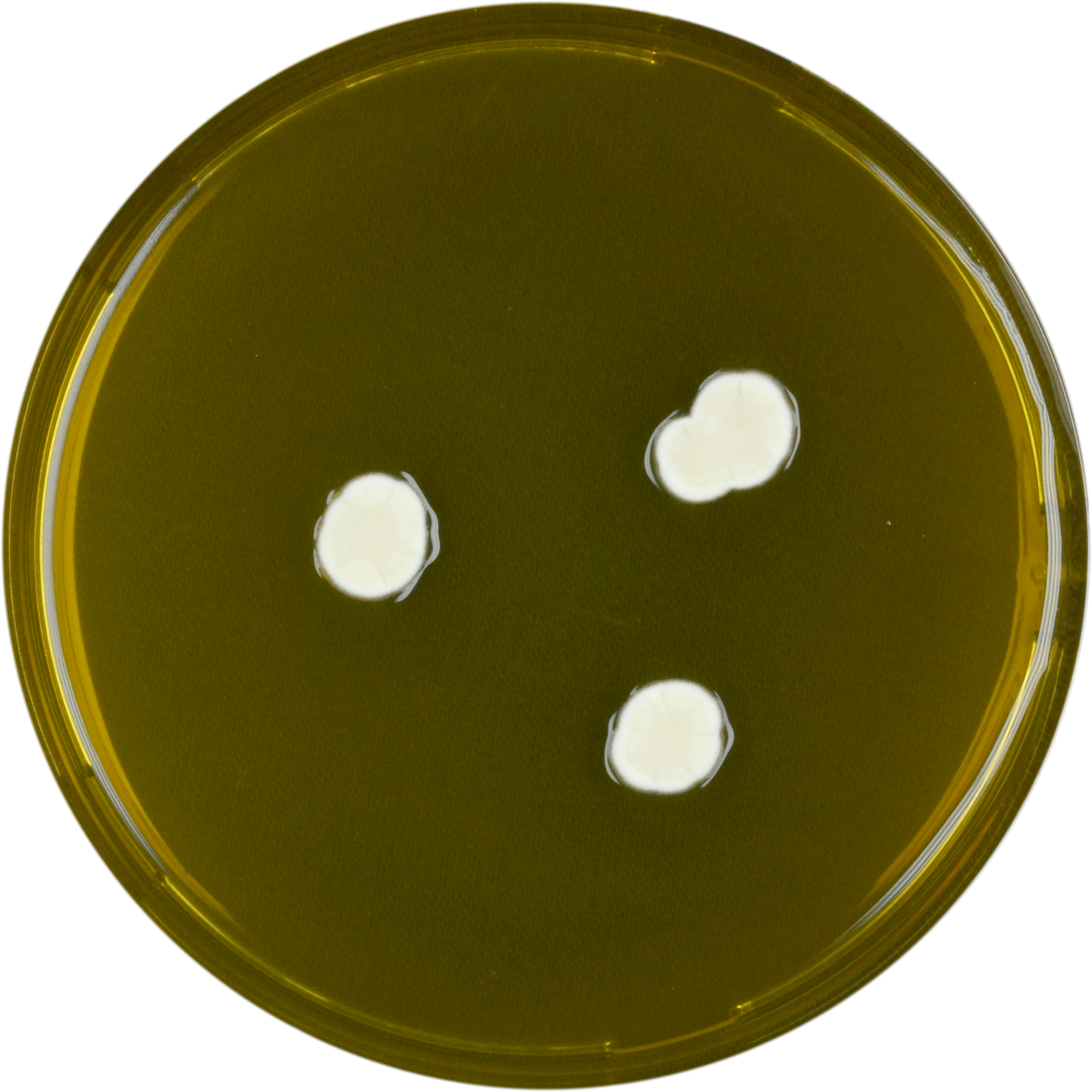
Aspergillus aurantiobrunneus growing on MEAOX plate
