= C25H28O5 =

The molecular formula C_{25}H_{28}O_{5} (molar mass: 408.49 g/mol, exact mass: 408.1937 u) may refer to:

- Debromomarinone
- Isoemericellin
