= C25H36O3 =

The molecular formula C_{25}H_{36}O_{3} (molar mass: 384.552 g/mol) may refer to:

- Estradiol enantate
- Nandrolone cyclohexanecarboxylate
- THCP-O-acetate
- Variecolactone
