= Fumigatonin =

Names
- IUPAC name [(4S,10S,11S,13S,14S,16R,17S,18R,21S,24S)-24-acetyloxy-9,9,13,16,17,21-hexamethyl-7,19-dioxo-2,8,20,22,23-pentaoxahexacyclo[12.8.1.118,21.01,16.04,10.04,14]tetracos-5-en-11-yl] acetate

Identifiers
3D model (JSmol)	Interactive image
ChEBI	CHEBI:217549
ChemSpider	78438663
PubChem CID	139588621
- InChI: InChI=1S/C29H38O11/c1-14-11-18(35-16(3)30)21-24(5,6)37-19(32)9-10-27(21)13-34-29-25(7,12-28(14,27)40-29)15(2)20-22(36-17(4)31)26(8,39-29)38-23(20)33/h9-10,14-15,18,20-22H,11-13H2,1-8H3/t14-,15-,18-,20+,21-,22-,25+,26-,27+,28-,29?/m0/s1 Key: HCHHDLAWUXCPHI-TYGDEDDDSA-N
- SMILES: C[C@H]1C[C@@H]([C@@H]2[C@@]3([C@]14C[C@@]5([C@H]([C@@H]6[C@@H]([C@@](OC6=O)(OC5(O4)OC3)C)OC(=O)C)C)C)C=CC(=O)OC2(C)C)OC(=O)C

Properties
Chemical formula	C_{28}H_{38}O_{11}
Molar mass	550.601 g·mol^{−1}
- Except where otherwise noted, data are given for materials in their standard state (at 25 °C [77 °F], 100 kPa). Infobox references

Fumigatonin is a meroterpenoid of the fungi Aspergillus fumigatus with the molecular formula C_{28}H_{38}O_{11}.
