= Anditomin =

Names
- IUPAC name (2S,3R,9R,12S,14R,16S,20S)-3,8,8,14-tetramethyl-21-methylidene-7,18-dioxahexacyclo[12.7.1.0^{2,12}.0^{3,9}.0^{12,20}.0^{16,20}]docos-4-ene-6,17,22-trione

Identifiers
CAS Number	79874-93-4
3D model (JSmol)	Interactive image
ChEBI	CHEBI:219836
ChemSpider	58837612
PubChem CID	91820511
- InChI: InChI=1S/C25H30O5/c1-13-17-18-23(5)8-7-16(26)30-21(2,3)15(23)6-9-24(18)11-22(4,19(17)27)10-14-20(28)29-12-25(13,14)24/h7-8,14-15,17-18H,1,6,9-12H2,2-5H3/t14-,15+,17?,18+,22-,23+,24+,25+/m1/s1 Key: HWLYZRWDCDSFFO-VIJQBOBYSA-N
- SMILES: C[C@]12C[C@@H]3C(=O)OC[C@]34C(=C)C(C1=O)[C@@H]5[C@@]4(C2)CC[C@@H]6[C@@]5(C=CC(=O)OC6(C)C)C

Properties
Chemical formula	C_{25}H_{30}O_{5}
Molar mass	410.510 g·mol^{−1}
- Except where otherwise noted, data are given for materials in their standard state (at 25 °C [77 °F], 100 kPa). Infobox references

Anditomin is an oxygenated meroterpenoid produced by Aspergillus stellatus or Aspergillus variecolor.

Aspergillus variecolor produces anditomin from 3,5-dimethylorsellinic acid and farnesyl pyrophosphate using 12 enzymes. The enzyme AndA firstly dehydrogenates one ring of preandiloid B to make preaniloid C. Next it causes a complex ring isomerisation to make anditomin.

== Properties ==
Anditomin can dissolve in ethyl acetate or chloroform. Anditomin forms tetragonal crystals with space group P4_{1} (No. 76), with unit cell dimensions a = 9.310 and c = 24.84 Å, and unit cell volume = 2153 Å_{3} with Z = 4, and density = 1.27 gcm^{−3}.
