= Pseudobaptigenin synthase =

Class of enzymes

Identifiers
- EC no.: 1.14.19.63

Databases
- IntEnz: IntEnz view
- BRENDA: BRENDA entry
- ExPASy: NiceZyme view
- KEGG: KEGG entry
- MetaCyc: metabolic pathway
- PRIAM: profile
- PDB structures: RCSB PDB PDBe PDBsum
Search
- PMC: articles
- PubMed: articles
- NCBI: proteins

Pseudobaptigenin synthase (EC 1.14.19.63) is an enzyme with systematic name calycosin,NADPH:oxygen oxidoreductase (methylenedioxy-bridge-forming). This enzyme catalyses two related chemical reactions:

calycosin
+ NADPH
O_{2}
2 H_{2}O
pseudobaptigenin
+ NADP^{+}

Pseudobaptigenin synthase is a cytochrome P450 protein containing heme. It requires a partner cytochrome P450 reductase for functional expression. This uses nicotinamide adenine dinucleotide phosphate (NADPH). Pratensein, a derivative of calycosin with an extra hydroxy group, is similarly converted into 5-hydroxypseudobaptigenin:

pratensein
+ NADPH
O_{2}
2 H_{2}O
5-hydroxypseudobaptigenin
+ NADP^{+}

The enzyme isolated from chickpea is part of the biosynthetic pathway to pterocarpans which act as phytoalexins.
