= Mangiferin =

Xanthanoid chemical compound

- Chemical structure of mangiferin

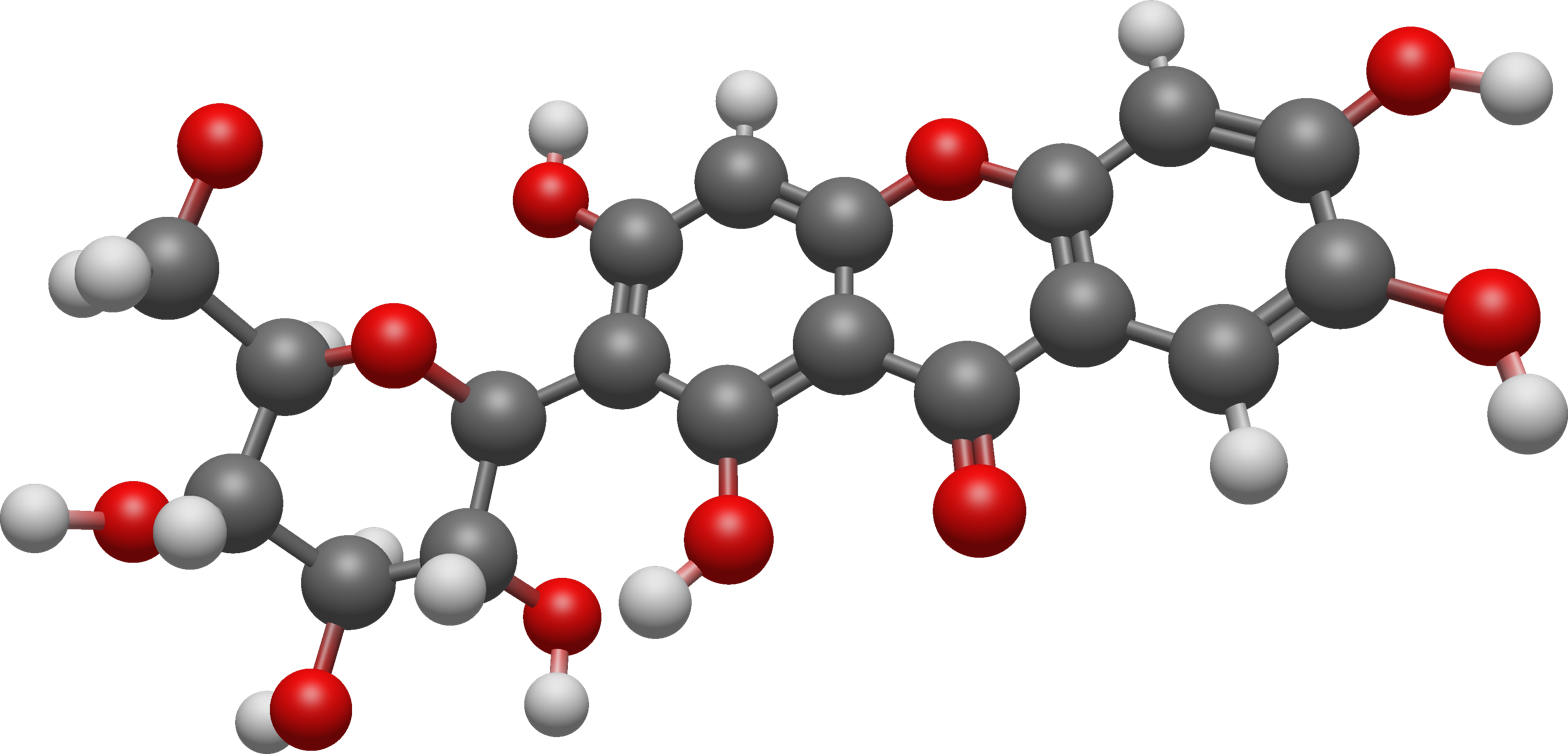
- Chemical structure of mangiferin 3D

Names
- IUPAC name 2-(β-D-Glucopyranosyl)-1,3,6,7-tetrahydroxy-9H-xanthen-9-one
- Systematic IUPAC name 1,3,6,7-Tetrahydroxy-2-[(2S,3R,4R,5S,6R)-3,4,5-trihydroxy-6-(hydroxymethyl)oxan-2-yl]-9H-xanthen-9-one
- Other names (1S)-1,5-Anhydro-1-(1,3,6,7-tetrahydroxy-9-oxo-9H-xanthen-2-yl)-D-glucitol

Identifiers
| CAS Number | 4773-96-0 |
| 3D model (JSmol) | Interactive image |
| ChEBI | CHEBI:6682 |
| ChEMBL | ChEMBL455364 |
| ChemSpider | 4444966 |
| ECHA InfoCard | 100.153.319 |
| KEGG | C10077 |
| PubChem CID | 5281647 |
| UNII | 1M84LD0UMD |
| CompTox Dashboard (EPA) | DTXSID60197263 |
- InChI: InChI=1S/C19H18O11/c20-4-11-15(25)17(27)18(28)19(30-11)12-8(23)3-10-13(16(12)26)14(24)5-1-6(21)7(22)2-9(5)29-10/h1-3,11,15,17-23,25-28H,4H2/t11-,15-,17+,18-,19+/m1/s1 Key: AEDDIBAIWPIIBD-ZJKJAXBQSA-N; InChI=1/C19H18O11/c20-4-11-15(25)17(27)18(28)19(30-11)12-8(23)3-10-13(16(12)26)14(24)5-1-6(21)7(22)2-9(5)29-10/h1-3,11,15,17-23,25-28H,4H2/t11-,15-,17+,18-,19+/m1/s1 Key: AEDDIBAIWPIIBD-ZJKJAXBQBF
- SMILES: C1=C2C(=CC(=C1O)O)OC3=C(C2=O)C(=C(C(=C3)O)[C@H]4[C@@H]([C@H]([C@@H]([C@H](O4)CO)O)O)O)O

Properties
| Chemical formula | C_{19}H_{18}O_{11} |
| Molar mass | 422.342 g·mol^{−1} |
| Appearance | white to light yellow powder |
| Solubility in water | slightly soluble but soluble in alkaline water |
| Solubility | slightly soluble in methanol and ethanol. soluble in 2-Pyrrolidone, formamide and N-methylformamide |
- Except where otherwise noted, data are given for materials in their standard state (at 25 °C [77 °F], 100 kPa). verify (what is ?) Infobox references

Mangiferin is a glucosylxanthone (xanthonoid).

== Natural occurrences ==
Mangiferin was first isolated from the leaves and bark of Mangifera indica (the mango tree). It can also be extracted from mango peels and kernels, Iris unguicularis, Anemarrhena asphodeloides rhizomes and Bombax ceiba leaves. It is also found in the genera Salacia and Cyclopia, as well as in coffee leaves and some species of Crocus.

Among the group of Asplenium hybrids known as the "Appalachian Asplenium complex", mangiferin and isomangiferin are produced only by Asplenium montanum and its hybrid descendants. The distinctive gold-orange fluorescence of these compounds under ultraviolet light has been used to aid in the chromatographic identification of hybrid Aspleniums.

== Research ==
Preliminary research is conducted on the potential biological properties of mangiferin, although there were no confirmed anti-disease effects or prescription drugs approved, as of 2019. Mangiferin is limited as it has low solubility, and poor trans membrane permeability. Mangiferin is naturally occurring, and is generally considered non-toxic in small amounts .

== See also ==
- Euxanthic acid
