= Irilone =

- Chemical structure of irilone

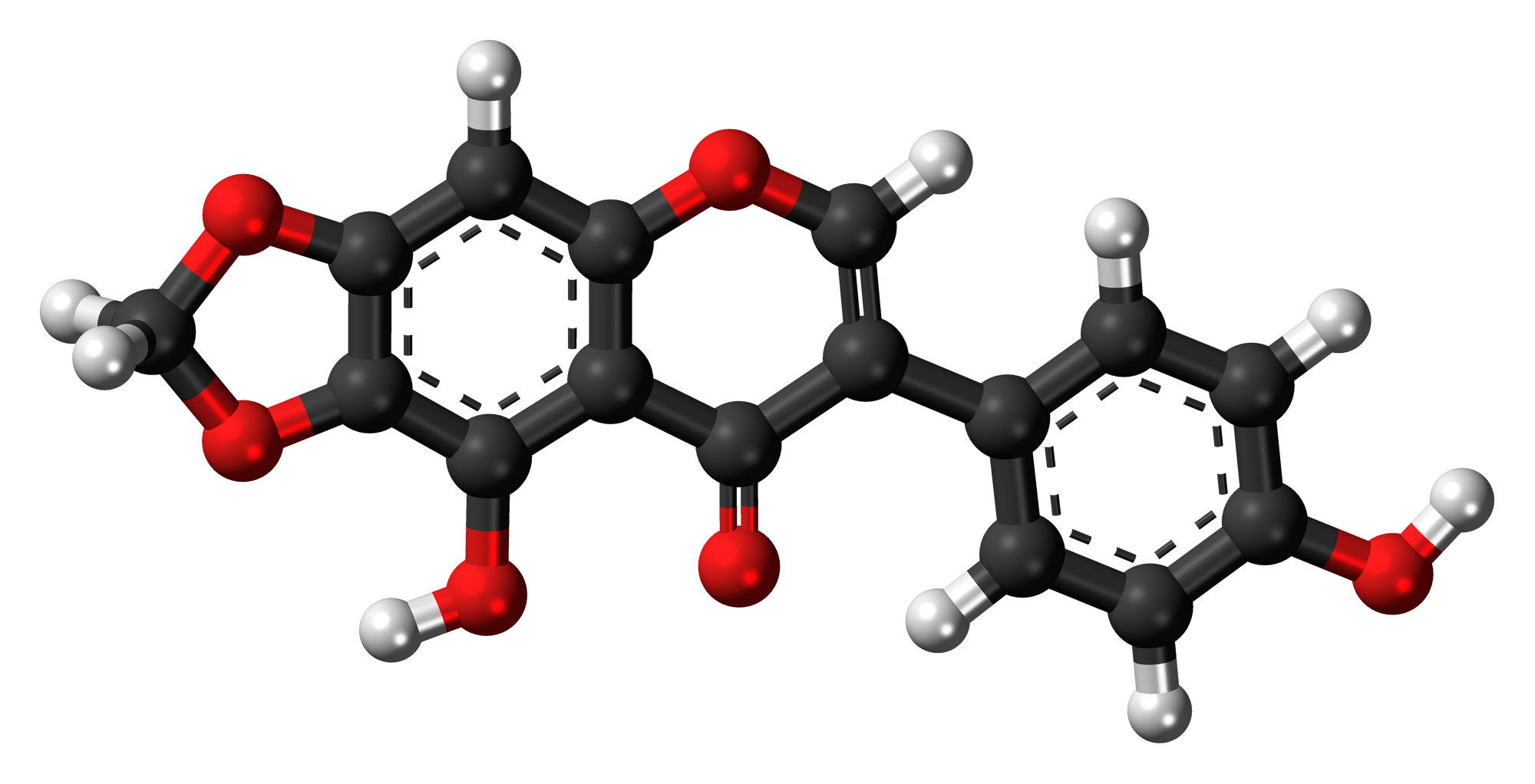

Names
- IUPAC name 4′,9-Dihydroxy-6,7-[methylenebis(oxy)]isoflavone
- Systematic IUPAC name 9-Hydroxy-7-(4-hydroxyphenyl)-2H,8H-[1,3]dioxolo[4,5-g][1]benzopyran-8-one

Identifiers
CAS Number	41653-81-0
3D model (JSmol)	Interactive image
ChEBI	CHEBI:5970
ChemSpider	4445092
KEGG	C10467
PubChem CID	5281779
UNII	FB3FTT7LYK
CompTox Dashboard (EPA)	DTXSID60415191
- InChI: InChI=1S/C16H10O6/c17-9-3-1-8(2-4-9)10-6-20-11-5-12-16(22-7-21-12)15(19)13(11)14(10)18/h1-6,17,19H,7H2 Key: NUGRQNBDTZWXTP-UHFFFAOYSA-N; InChI=1/C16H10O6/c17-9-3-1-8(2-4-9)10-6-20-11-5-12-16(22-7-21-12)15(19)13(11)14(10)18/h1-6,17,19H,7H2 Key: NUGRQNBDTZWXTP-UHFFFAOYAV
- SMILES: C1OC2=C(O1)C(=C3C(=C2)OC=C(C3=O)C4=CC=C(C=C4)O)O

Properties
Chemical formula	C_{16}H_{10}O_{6}
Molar mass	298.24 g/mol
- Except where otherwise noted, data are given for materials in their standard state (at 25 °C [77 °F], 100 kPa). verify (what is ?) Infobox references

Irilone is an isoflavone, a type of flavonoid. It can be found in Trifolium pratense (red clover), in Iris unguicularis and in Iris germanica.
