= Ajamxanthone =

Names
- IUPAC name (+)-2,3,3a,12-Tetrahydro-9-hydroxy-11-(hydroxymethyl)-3,3,3a,8-tetramethyl-2-methylene-10H-pentaleno[2,1-b]xanthen-10-one
- Other names (+)-Ajamxanthone and CTK8I3902

Identifiers
CAS Number	35660-47-0
3D model (JSmol)	Interactive image
ChemSpider	129558010
PubChem CID	71437235
CompTox Dashboard (EPA)	DTXSID301336766
- InChI: InChI=1S/C25H24O4/c1-12-6-7-18-21(22(12)27)23(28)20-16(11-26)15-9-14-8-13(2)24(3,4)25(14,5)17(15)10-19(20)29-18/h6-8,10,26-27H,2,9,11H2,1,3-5H3 Key: NAECPZBZXXPKNN-UHFFFAOYSA-N
- SMILES: CC1=C(C2=C(C=C1)OC3=C(C2=O)C(=C4CC5=CC(=C)C(C5(C4=C3)C)(C)C)CO)O

Properties
Chemical formula	C_{25}H_{24}O_{4}
Molar mass	388.463 g·mol^{−1}
- Except where otherwise noted, data are given for materials in their standard state (at 25 °C [77 °F], 100 kPa). Infobox references

Ajamxanthone is a chemical compound which is produced by the fungus Aspergillus stellatus. Ajamxanthone forms yellow needles. Its synonyms are (+)-ajamxanthone and CTK8I3902.
