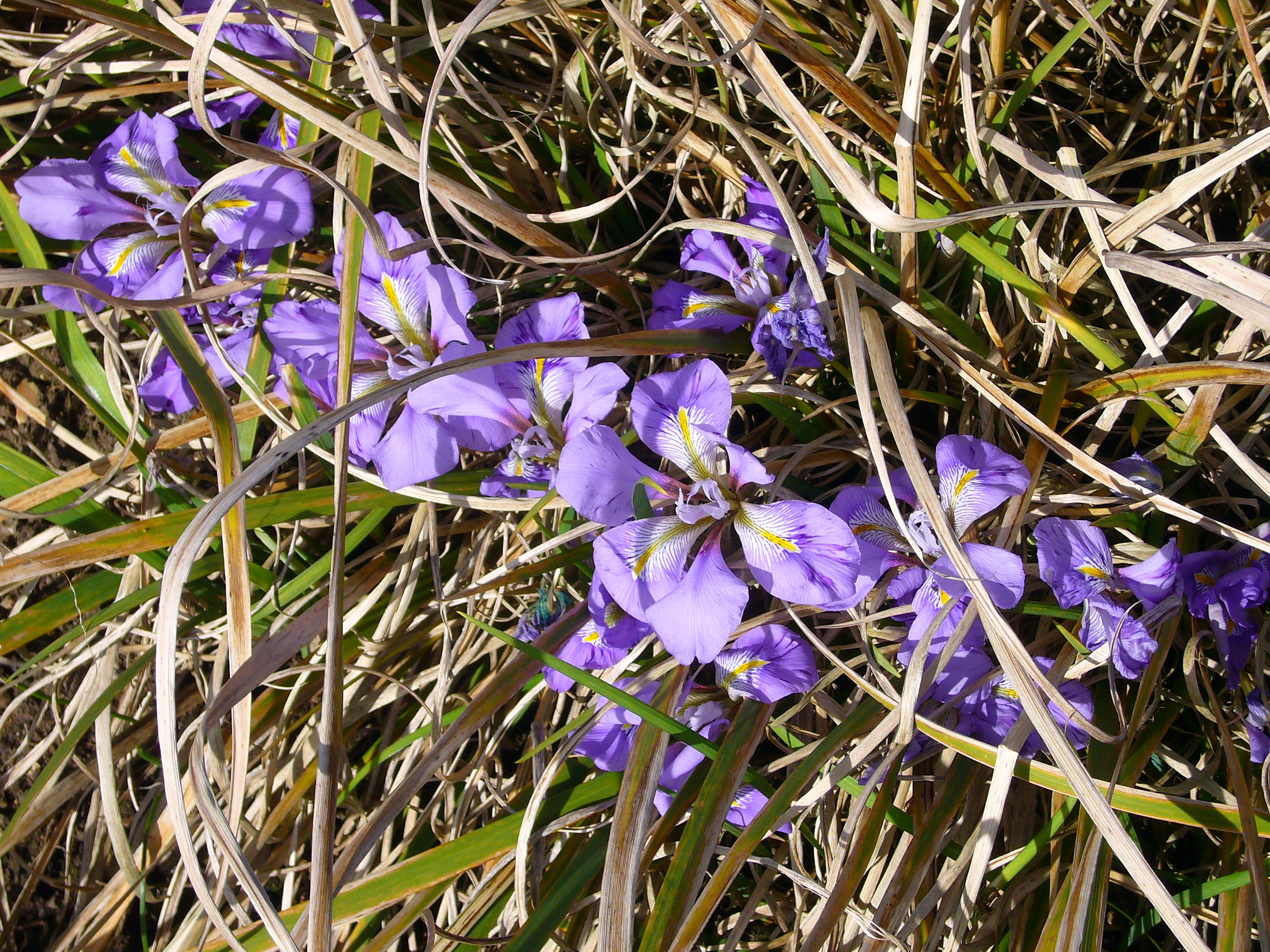

Scientific classification
- Kingdom: Plantae
- Clade: Tracheophytes
- Clade: Angiosperms
- Clade: Monocots
- Order: Asparagales
- Family: Iridaceae
- Genus: Iris
- Subgenus: Iris subg. Limniris
- Section: Iris sect. Limniris
- Series: Iris ser. Unguiculares
- Species: I. unguicularis

Binomial name
- Iris unguicularis Poir.

Synonyms
- Iris stylosa Desf.; Iris unguicularis f. lilacina Spreng. ex André; Iris unguicularis f. marginata Spreng. ex André; Iris unguicularis f. pavonia Spreng. ex André; Iris unguicularis f. speciosa Spreng. ex André; Iris unguicularis subsp. unguicularis (unknown); Joniris stylosa (Desf.) Klatt; Neubeckia stylosa (Desf.) Alef.; Siphonostylis unguicularis (Poir.) Wern.Schulze

= Iris unguicularis =

Species of flowering plant

Iris unguicularis (syn. Iris stylosa), the Algerian iris, is a rhizomatous flowering plant in the genus Iris, native to Algeria, Greece, Turkey, Western Syria, and Tunisia. It grows to 30 centimetres (12 in), with grassy evergreen leaves, producing pale lilac or purple flowers with a central band of yellow on the falls. The flowers appear in winter and early spring. They are fragrant, with pronounced perianth tubes up to 20 cm (7.9 in) long.

This plant is widely cultivated in temperate regions, and numerous cultivars have been selected for garden use, including a slightly more tender white form 'Alba', and a dwarf variety I. unguicularis subsp. cretensis. The cultivar 'Mary Barnard' has gained the Royal Horticultural Society's Award of Garden Merit.

== Chemistry ==
In 2013, a chemical analysis study was carried on Iris loczyi and Iris unguicularis as both plants are known as medicinally important. The rhizome of Iris unguicularis contains 1,3-O-diferuloylsucrose, 5,7-dihydroxy-6-methoxychromone, irilone, 4′,5,7-trihydroxy-6-methoxyflavanone, tectorigenin, kaempferol, 4′,5,7-trihydroxy-3′,8-dimethoxyflavanone, 8-methoxyeriodictyol, hispidulin and mangiferin.
