= Ψ-Tectorigenin =

ψ-Tectorigenin

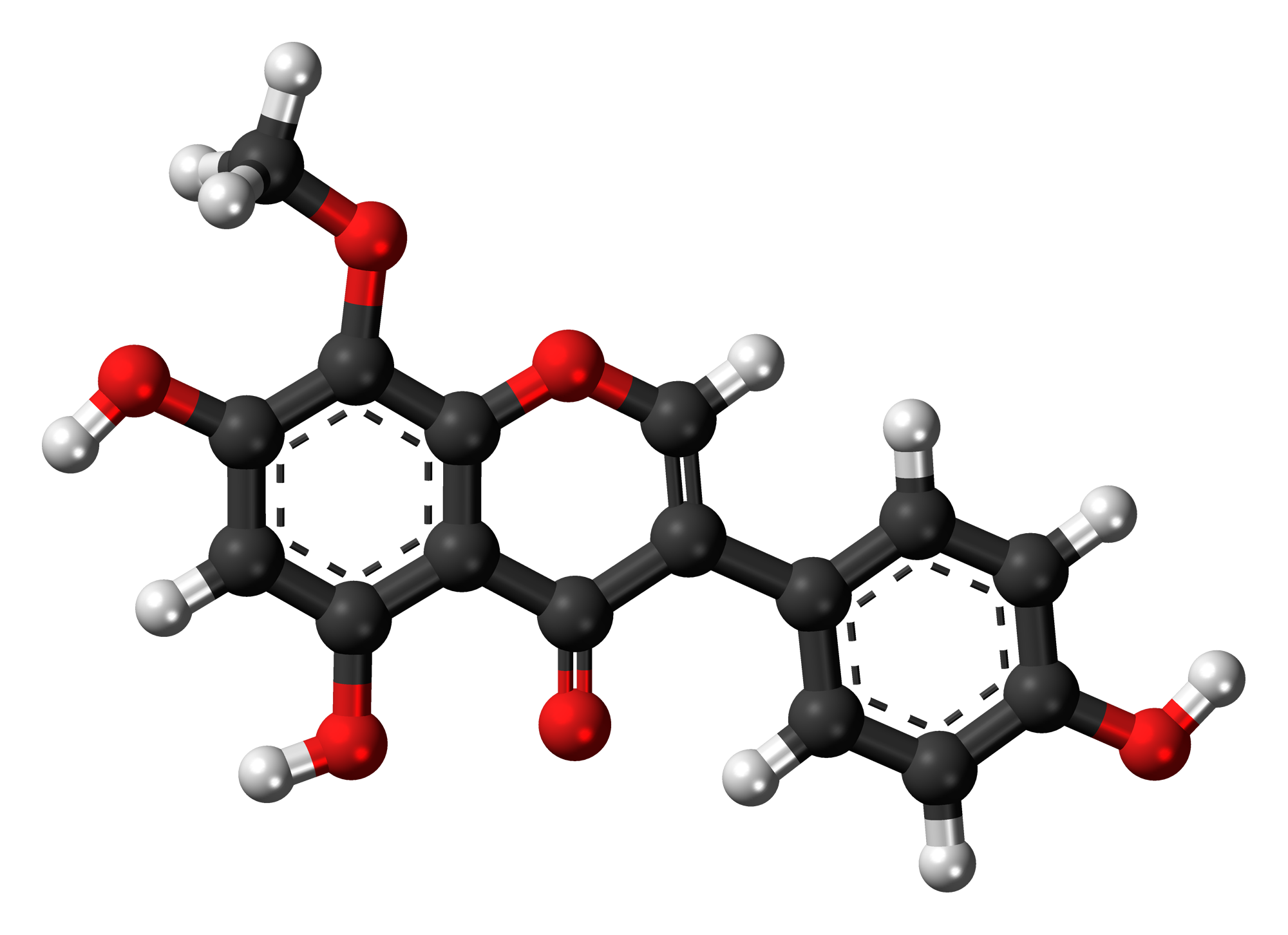

Names
- IUPAC name 4′,5,7-Trihydroxy-8-methoxyisoflavone
- Systematic IUPAC name 5,7-Dihydroxy-3-(4-hydroxyphenyl)-8-methoxy-4H-1-benzopyran-4-one
- Other names Isotectorigenin; Pseudotectorigenin

Identifiers
CAS Number	13111-57-4
3D model (JSmol)	Interactive image
ChEMBL	ChEMBL242741
ChemSpider	4510255
PubChem CID	5353911
UNII	8HXB4THX7F
CompTox Dashboard (EPA)	DTXSID00156899
- InChI: InChI=1S/C16H12O6/c1-21-15-12(19)6-11(18)13-14(20)10(7-22-16(13)15)8-2-4-9(17)5-3-8/h2-7,17-19H,1H3 Key: UYLQOGTYNFVQQX-UHFFFAOYSA-N
- SMILES: COC1=C(C=C(C2=C1OC=C(C2=O)C3=CC=C(C=C3)O)O)O

Properties
Chemical formula	C_{16}H_{12}O_{6}
Molar mass	300.266 g·mol^{−1}
- Except where otherwise noted, data are given for materials in their standard state (at 25 °C [77 °F], 100 kPa). verify (what is ?) Infobox references

ψ-Tectorigenin is an O-methylated isoflavone, a type of flavonoid. It can be isolated from Belamcanda chinensis, Dalbergia sissoo. It can also be isolated from the bacterium Nocardiopsis sp, and from the mold Stemphilium sp. No. 644.

== See also ==
- Tectorigenin, a related flavonoid
