= Tectoridin =

Names
- IUPAC name 7-(β-D-Glucopyranosyloxy)-4′,5-dihydroxy-6-methoxyisoflavone
- Systematic IUPAC name 5-Hydroxy-3-(4-hydroxyphenyl)-6-methoxy-7-{[(2S,3R,4S,5S,6R)-3,4,5-trihydroxy-6-(hydroxymethyl)oxan-2-yl]oxy}-4H-1-benzopyran-4-one
- Other names Tectorigenin 7-glucoside Glycosylated tectorigenin Shekanin; 4',5-Dihydro-6-methoxy-7-(o-glucoside)isoflavone

Identifiers
CAS Number	611-40-5
3D model (JSmol)	Interactive image
ChEBI	CHEBI:9428
ChEMBL	ChEMBL520214
ChemSpider	4445121
ECHA InfoCard	100.208.664
KEGG	C10533
PubChem CID	5281810
UNII	968X515NZH
CompTox Dashboard (EPA)	DTXSID70209982
- InChI: InChI=1S/C22H22O11/c1-30-21-13(32-22-20(29)19(28)17(26)14(7-23)33-22)6-12-15(18(21)27)16(25)11(8-31-12)9-2-4-10(24)5-3-9/h2-6,8,14,17,19-20,22-24,26-29H,7H2,1H3/t14-,17-,19+,20-,22-/m1/s1 Key: CNOURESJATUGPN-UDEBZQQRSA-N; InChI=1/C22H22O11/c1-30-21-13(32-22-20(29)19(28)17(26)14(7-23)33-22)6-12-15(18(21)27)16(25)11(8-31-12)9-2-4-10(24)5-3-9/h2-6,8,14,17,19-20,22-24,26-29H,7H2,1H3/t14-,17-,19+,20-,22-/m1/s1 Key: CNOURESJATUGPN-UDEBZQQRBO
- SMILES: COC1=C(C=C2C(=C1O)C(=O)C(=CO2)C3=CC=C(C=C3)O)O[C@H]4[C@@H]([C@H]([C@@H]([C@H](O4)CO)O)O)O

Properties
Chemical formula	C_{22}H_{22}O_{11}
Molar mass	462.40 g/mol
- Except where otherwise noted, data are given for materials in their standard state (at 25 °C [77 °F], 100 kPa). verify (what is ?) Infobox references

Tectoridin is an isoflavone, a type of flavonoid. It is the 7-glucoside of tectorigenin and can be isolated from flowers of Pueraria thunbergiana (Leguminosae).
