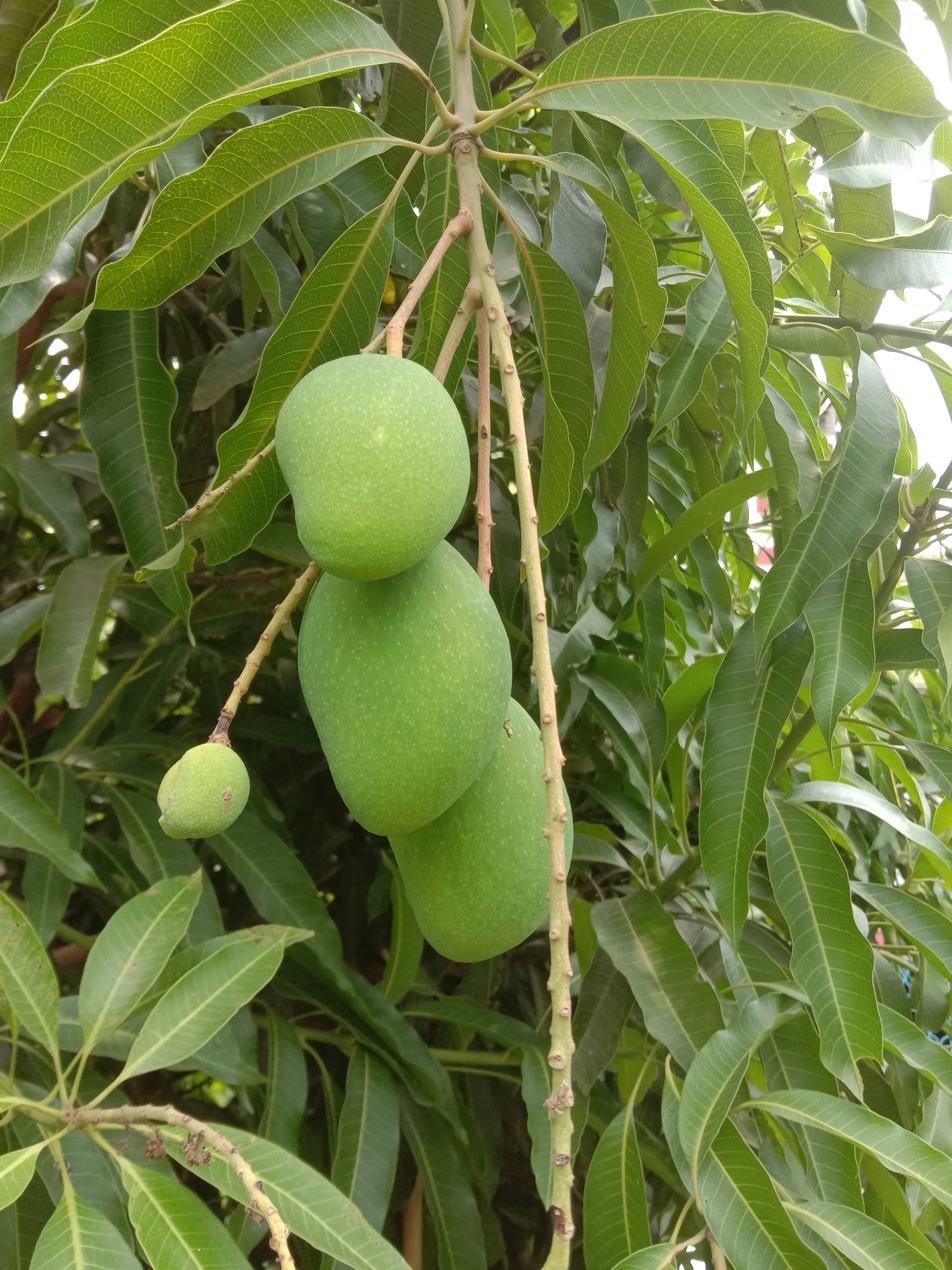
- Mangoes in West Bengal, India

Conservation status
- Data Deficient (IUCN 3.1)

Scientific classification
- Kingdom: Plantae
- Clade: Tracheophytes
- Clade: Angiosperms
- Clade: Eudicots
- Clade: Rosids
- Order: Sapindales
- Family: Anacardiaceae
- Genus: Mangifera
- Species: M. indica

Binomial name
- Mangifera indica L.

Synonyms
- Mangifera amba Forssk.; Mangifera anisodora Blanco; Mangifera austroyunnanensis Hu; Mangifera balba Crevost & Lemarié; Mangifera cambodiana (Pierre) Anon.; Mangifera domestica Gaertn.; Mangifera equina Crevost & Lemarié; Mangifera gladiata Bojer; Mangifera kukulu Blume; Mangifera laxiflora Desr.; Mangifera linnaei Korth. ex Hassk.; Mangifera maritima Lechaume; Mangifera mekongensis (Pierre) Anon.; Mangifera montana B.Heyne ex Wight & Arn.; Mangifera oryza Crevost & Lemarié; Mangifera rostrata Blanco; Mangifera rubra Bojer; Mangifera sativa Roem. & Schult.; Mangifera siamensis Warb. ex Craib; Mangifera viridis Bojer

= Mangifera indica =

Mango

Species of flowering plant

Mangifera indica, commonly known as the mango tree after its fruit, is an evergreen species of flowering plant in the family Anacardiaceae. It is a large fruit tree, capable of growing to a height and width of 30 m (100 ft). There are two distinct genetic populations in modern mangoes – the "Indian type" and the "Southeast Asian type".

== Description ==
Mangifera indica is a large green tree, valued mainly for its fruits, both green and ripe. Approximately 500–1000 varieties have been identified, named, or reported, primarily in India. It can grow up to 15–30 metres (50–100 feet) tall with a similar crown width and a trunk circumference of more than 3.7 m (12 ft). The leaves are simple, shiny and dark green. The trees take 2–4 years from planting time to first harvest, and can have a productive life of over 50 years.

Yellow-white fragrant flowers appear at the end of winter through the beginning of spring, varying with location. Both male and female flowers are borne on the same tree. Climatic conditions have a significant influence on the time of flowering. In India, flowering starts in December in the south, in January in Bengal, in February in eastern Uttar Pradesh and Bihar, and in February–March in northern India. The duration of flowering is 20–25 days for the Dasheri variety, while panicle emergence occurs in early December and flower opening is completed by February. The Neelum variety produces two crops a year in Kanyakumari, Tamil Nadu, but it flowers only once in North Indian conditions.

The mango is an irregular, egg-shaped fruit which is a fleshy drupe. Mangos are typically 8–12 centimetres (3–5 inches) long and greenish yellow in color. The fruits can be round, oval, heart, or kidney shaped. Mango fruits are green when they are unripe. The interior flesh is bright orange and soft with a large, flat pit in the middle. Mangos are mature in April and May. Raw mangos can be used in the making of pickles and chutneys. Ripe mangos are a popular fruit throughout the world. The skin and pulp account for 85% of the mango's weight, and the remaining 15% comes from the stone (seed).

== Chemistry ==
Mangiferin (a pharmacologically active hydroxylated xanthone C-glycoside) is extracted from mango at high concentrations from the young leaves (172 g/kg), bark (107 g/kg), roots and from old leaves (94 g/kg). Allergenic urushiols are present in the fruit peel.

== Taxonomy ==
Mangoes are believed to have originated from the region between northwestern Myanmar, Bangladesh, eastern and northeastern India. M. indica were domesticated separately in India and Southeast Asia over centuries, resulting in two distinct genetic populations in modern mangoes – the "Indian type" and the "Southeast Asian type".

The species was first described by Linnaeus in 1753. The scientific name Mangifera indica can be translated as "a mango-bearing plant of India".

== Distribution and habitat ==
Since their domestication in southeastern Asia, mangoes have been introduced to other warm regions of the world. Generally, mango trees can withstand a minimum temperature of 17 °F (−8 °C).

Its broader native range extends from Pakistan to Malesia in subtropical and tropical climates with its origin point being around Western Indo-Burma.

The tree grows best in well-drained sandy loam; it does not grow well in heavy wet soils. The optimal pH of the soil should be between 5.2 and 7.5.

== Toxicity ==
Urushiols in the fruit peel can trigger contact dermatitis in sensitised individuals. This reaction is more likely to occur in people who have been exposed to other plants from the family Anacardiaceae, such as poison oak and poison ivy, which are widespread in the United States.

The wood is known to produce phenolic substances that can cause contact dermatitis.

== Uses ==
The tree is better known for its fruit than for its timber. However, mango trees can be converted to lumber once their fruit-bearing lifespan has finished. The wood is susceptible to damage from fungi and insects. The wood is used for musical instruments such as ukuleles, plywood and low-cost furniture.

The bark is used to produce a yellow dye.

== Culture ==
The mango is the national fruit of India, Pakistan, and the Philippines, and is the national tree of Bangladesh.

The Indian mango is exported from India to the United States, where it has high demand.

== Gallery ==
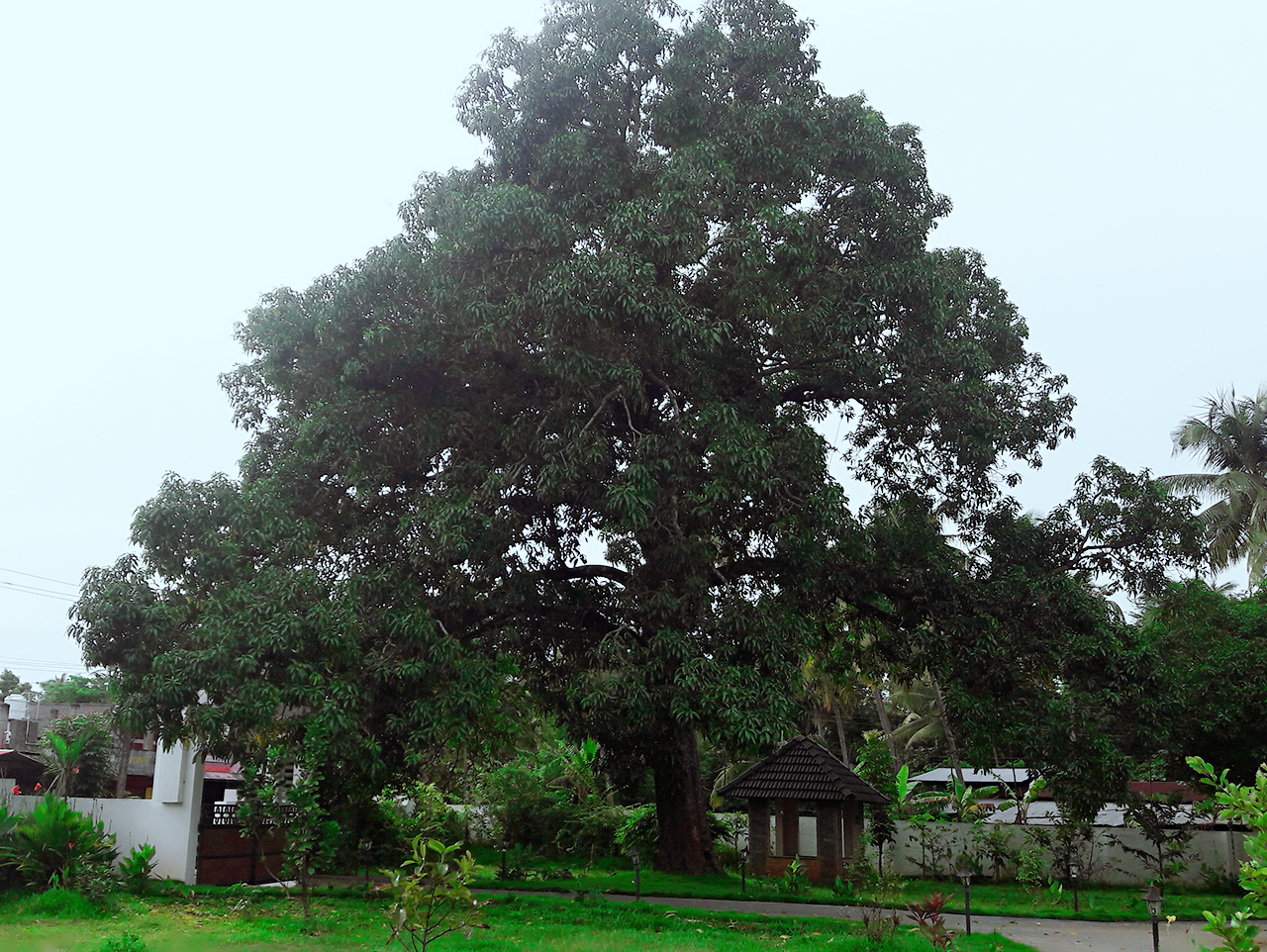
Mature tree

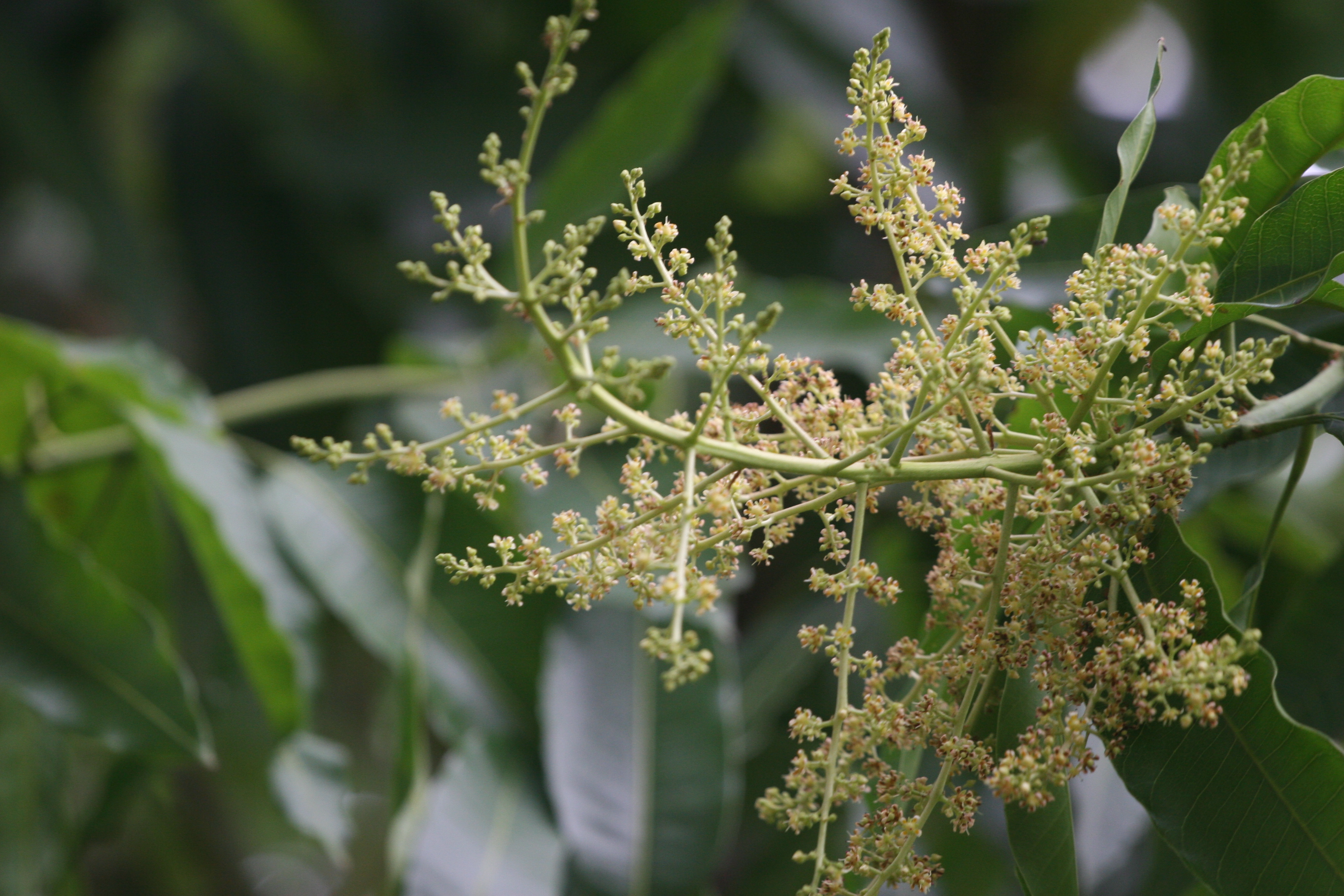
Flowers

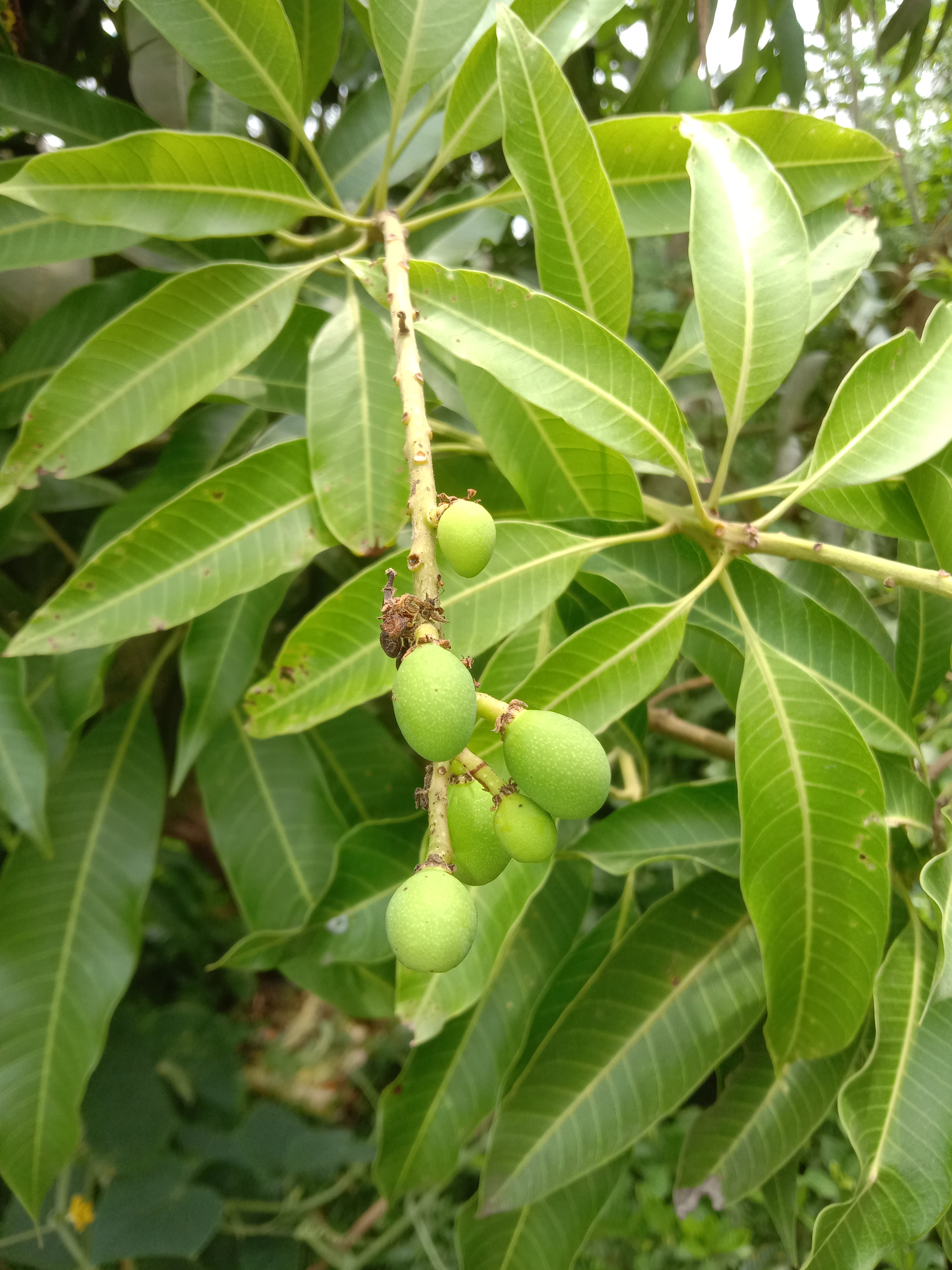
Baby fruits

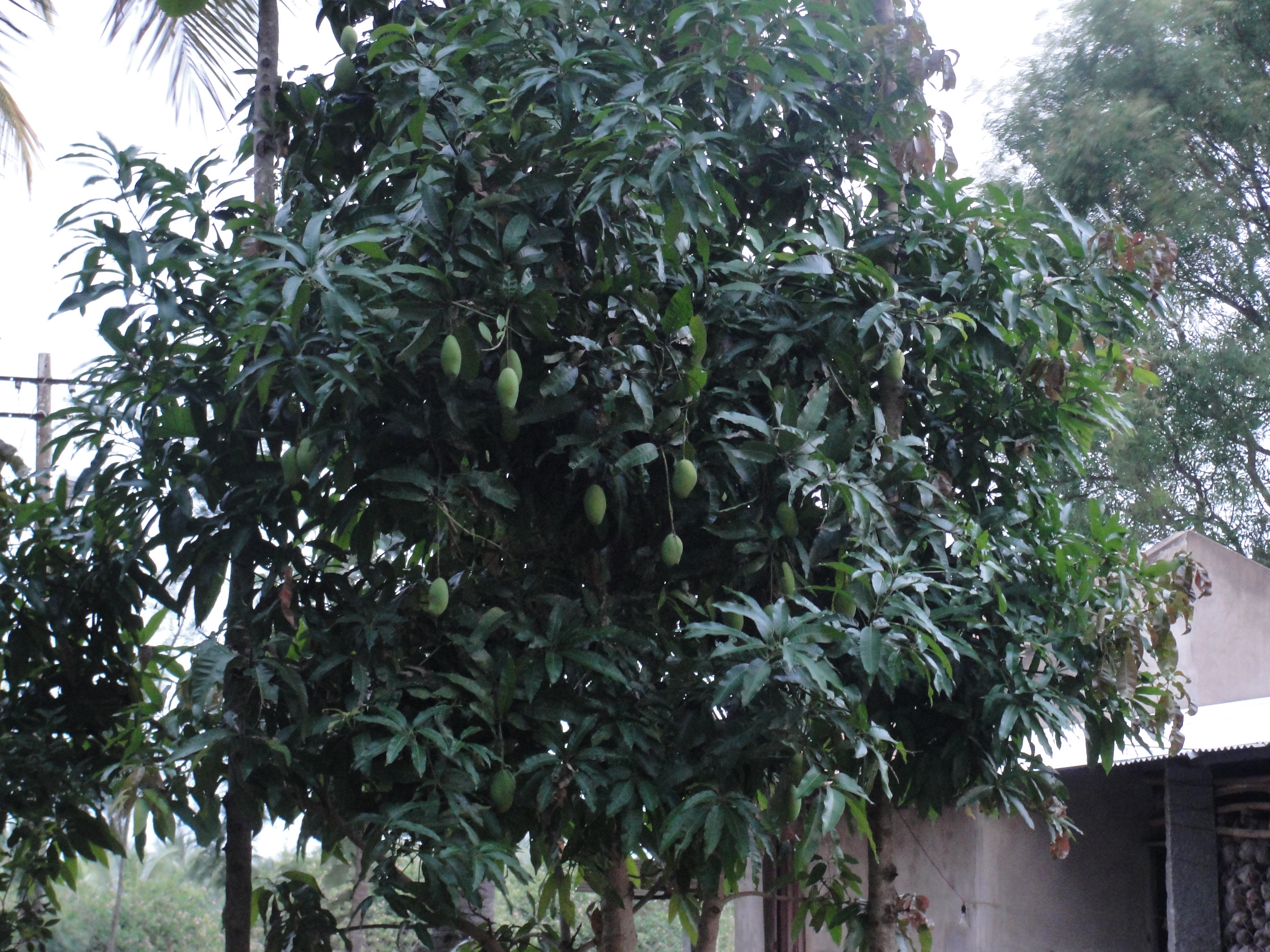
Tree with unripe fruits

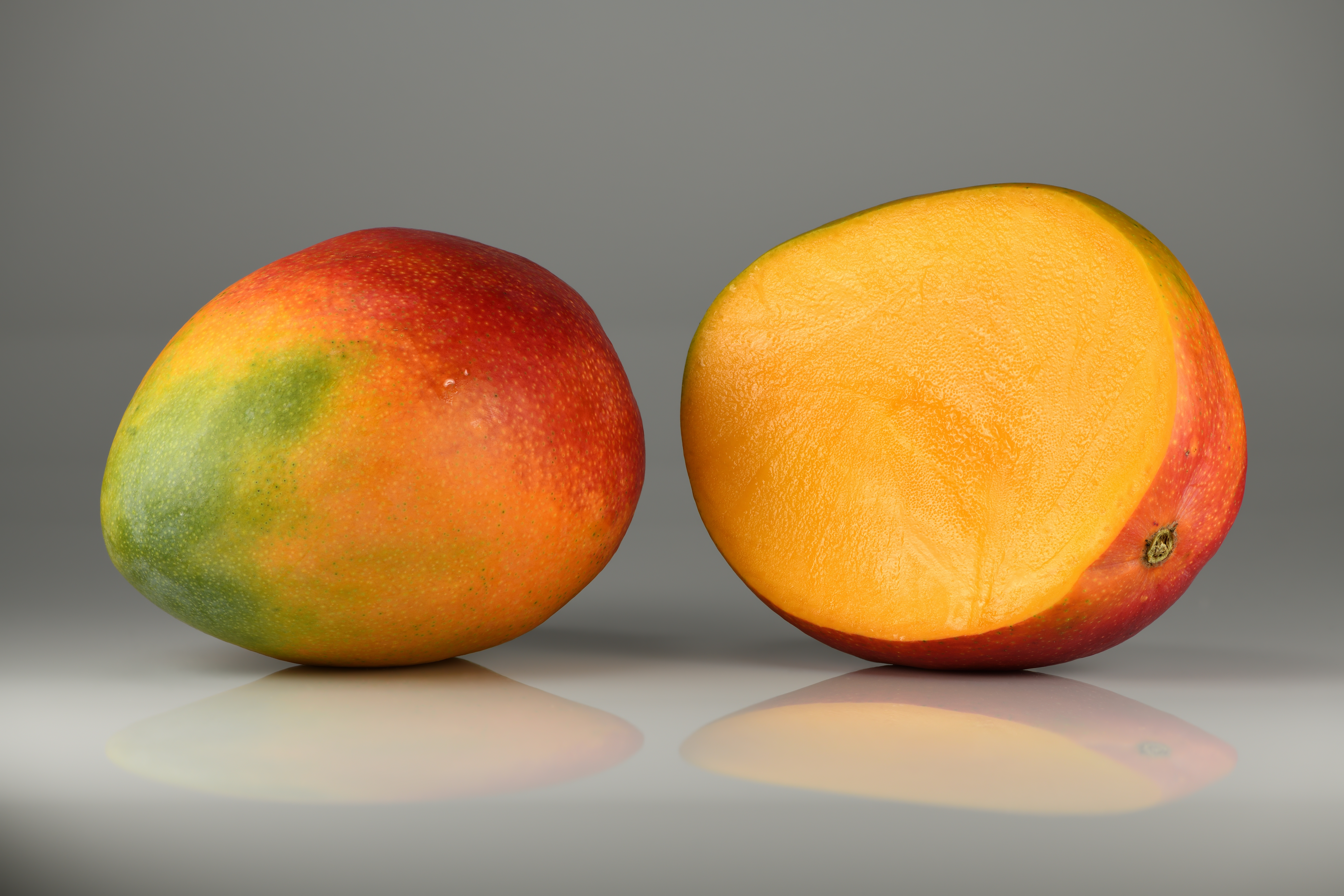
Indian type fruits

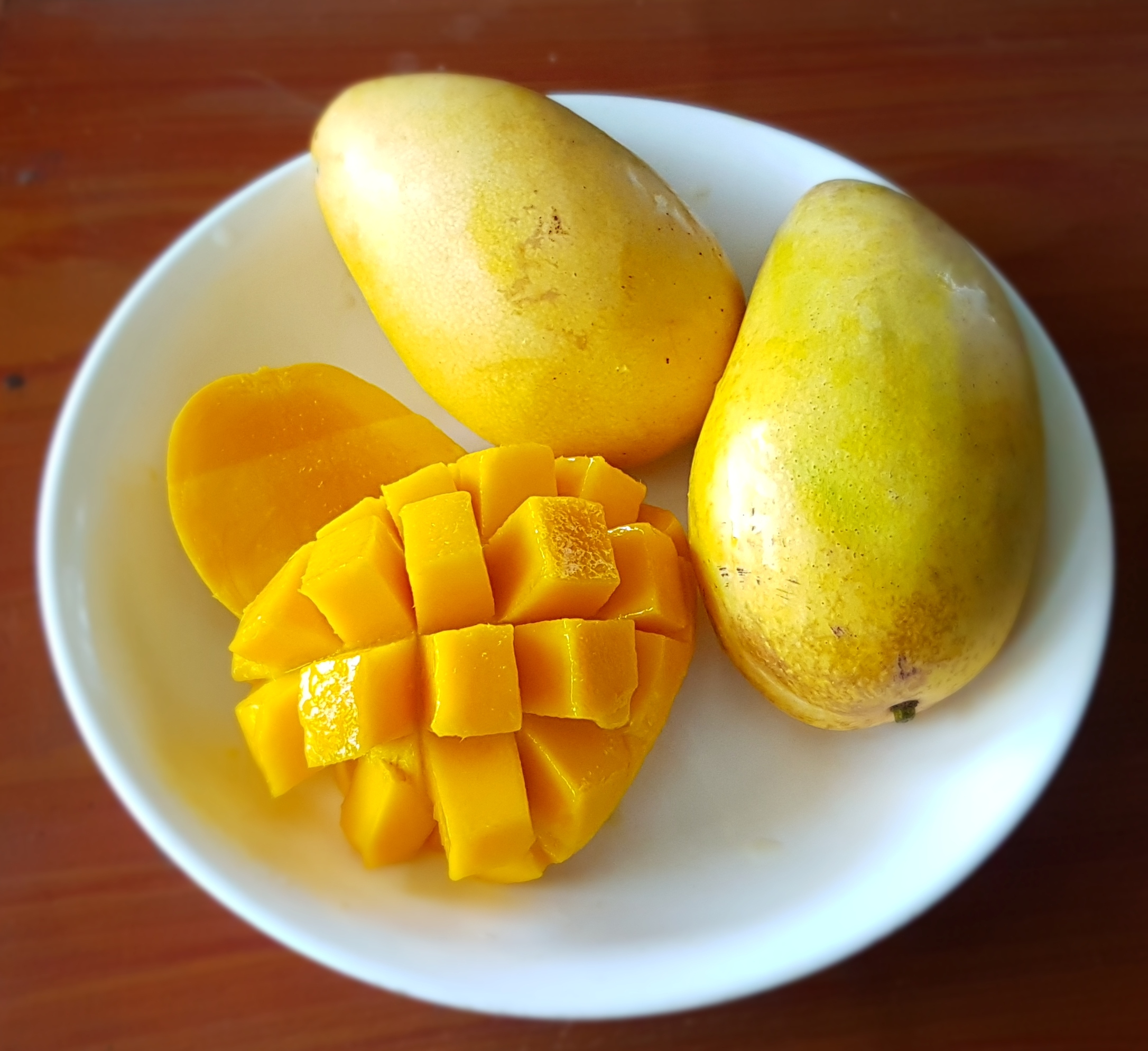
Southeast Asian type fruits
