= Tectorigenin =

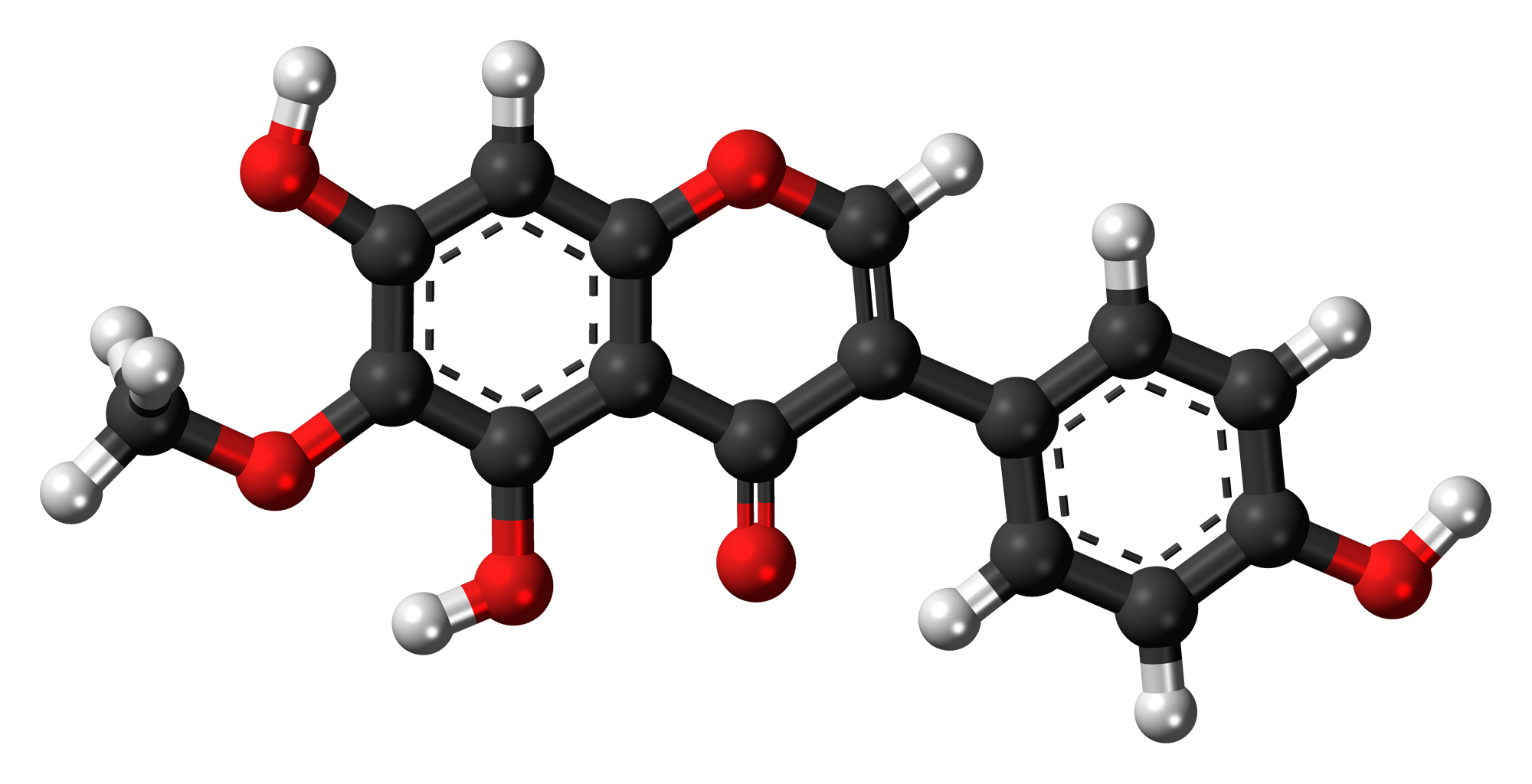

Names
- IUPAC name 4′,5,7-Trihydroxy-6-methoxyisoflavone
- Systematic IUPAC name 5,7-Dihydroxy-3-(4-hydroxyphenyl)-6-methoxy-4H-1-benzopyran-4-one
- Other names Tectorigenine

Identifiers
CAS Number	548-77-6
3D model (JSmol)	Interactive image
ChEBI	CHEBI:9429
ChEMBL	ChEMBL242740
ChemSpider	4445122
ECHA InfoCard	100.208.621
KEGG	C10534
PubChem CID	5281811
UNII	855130H9CO
CompTox Dashboard (EPA)	DTXSID50203286
- InChI: InChI=1S/C16H12O6/c1-21-16-11(18)6-12-13(15(16)20)14(19)10(7-22-12)8-2-4-9(17)5-3-8/h2-7,17-18,20H,1H3 Key: OBBCRPUNCUPUOS-UHFFFAOYSA-N; InChI=1/C16H12O6/c1-21-16-11(18)6-12-13(15(16)20)14(19)10(7-22-12)8-2-4-9(17)5-3-8/h2-7,17-18,20H,1H3 Key: OBBCRPUNCUPUOS-UHFFFAOYAZ
- SMILES: COC1=C(C=C2C(=C1O)C(=O)C(=CO2)C3=CC=C(C=C3)O)O

Properties
Chemical formula	C_{16}H_{12}O_{6}
Molar mass	300.266 g·mol^{−1}
- Except where otherwise noted, data are given for materials in their standard state (at 25 °C [77 °F], 100 kPa). verify (what is ?) Infobox references

Tectorigenin is an O-methylated isoflavone, a type of flavonoid. It has been isolated from leopard lily (Belamcanda chinensis), Algerian iris (Iris unguicularis) and East Asian arrowroot (Pueraria thunbergiana).

== Glycosides ==
Tectoridin is the 7-glucoside of tectorigenin.

== See also ==
- ψ-Tectorigenin, an isomeric flavonoid
