= Euxanthic acid =

Names
- IUPAC name (8-Hydroxy-9-oxo-9H-xanthen-2-yl) β-D-glucopyranosiduronic acid
- Systematic IUPAC name (2S,3S,4S,5R,6S)-3,4,5-Trihydroxy-6-[(8-hydroxy-9-oxo-9H-xanthen-2-yl)oxy]oxane-2-carboxylic acid

Identifiers
CAS Number	525-14-4
3D model (JSmol)	Interactive image
ChemSpider	21106448
PubChem CID	44516816
UNII	2CR36EK4YE
CompTox Dashboard (EPA)	DTXSID10659245
- InChI: InChI=1S/C19H16O10/c20-9-2-1-3-11-12(9)13(21)8-6-7(4-5-10(8)28-11)27-19-16(24)14(22)15(23)17(29-19)18(25)26/h1-6,14-17,19-20,22-24H,(H,25,26)/t14-,15-,16+,17-,19+/m0/s1 Key: JGIDSJGZGFYYNX-YUAHOQAQSA-N; InChI=1/C19H16O10/c20-9-2-1-3-11-12(9)13(21)8-6-7(4-5-10(8)28-11)27-19-16(24)14(22)15(23)17(29-19)18(25)26/h1-6,14-17,19-20,22-24H,(H,25,26)/t14-,15-,16+,17-,19+/m0/s1 Key: JGIDSJGZGFYYNX-YUAHOQAQBY
- SMILES: OC(=O)[C@H]4O[C@@H](Oc1ccc2Oc3cccc(O)c3C(=O)c2c1)[C@H](O)[C@@H](O)[C@@H]4O

Properties
Chemical formula	C_{19}H_{16}O_{10}
Molar mass	404.327 g·mol^{−1}
Density	1.737 g/ml
- Except where otherwise noted, data are given for materials in their standard state (at 25 °C [77 °F], 100 kPa). verify (what is ?) Infobox references

Euxanthic acid is a xanthonoid glycoside, a conjugate of the aglycone euxanthone with glucuronic acid. Its magnesium salt is the primary colourant of the pigment Indian Yellow.
