= Debromomarinone =

Names
- Preferred IUPAC name (4aR,5S,12bS)-8,10-Dihydroxy-2,5-dimethyl-5-(4-methylpent-3-en-1-yl)-3,4a,5,12b-tetrahydro-4H-naphtho[2,3-c][2]benzopyran-7,12-dione

Identifiers
CAS Number	146488-64-4
3D model (JSmol)	Interactive image
ChemSpider	8584615
PubChem CID	10409178
CompTox Dashboard (EPA)	DTXSID101336053
- InChI: InChI=1S/C25H28O5/c1-13(2)6-5-9-25(4)18-8-7-14(3)10-16(18)21-22(28)17-11-15(26)12-19(27)20(17)23(29)24(21)30-25/h6,10-12,16,18,26-27H,5,7-9H2,1-4H3/t16-,18+,25-/m0/s1 Key: DPALYVVGGATILJ-UVNWJPITSA-N
- SMILES: O=C2C=1O[C@@]([C@H]4[C@@H](C=1C(=O)c3cc(O)cc(O)c23)/C=C(\CC4)C)(C)CC\C=C(/C)C

Properties
Chemical formula	C_{25}H_{28}O_{5}
Molar mass	408.494 g·mol^{−1}

Related compounds
Related compounds	Marinone
- Except where otherwise noted, data are given for materials in their standard state (at 25 °C [77 °F], 100 kPa). Infobox references

Debromomarinone is a chemical compound isolated from marine actinomycetes.

== Biosynthesis ==
The proposed biosynthesis of marinone was first reported by Murray et al. in 2018. The biosynthesis of marinone begins with 1,3,6,8-tetrahydroxynaphthalene (THN), which is known to be biosynthesized via the condensation of five malonyl-coenzyme A units followed by the aromatization of the resulting pentaketide using a type III polyketide synthase. Next, THN undergoes geranylation or farnesylation at the C-4 position, yielding 1 (Fig. 1). This transformation is catalyzed in vivo by NphB aromatic prenyltransferase in naphterpin biosynthesis or by CnqP3 or CnqP4 in marinone biosynthesis. Then, 1 undergoes oxidative dearomatization which is catalyzed by VCPO, which is a vanadium-dependent chloroperoxidase enzyme. This transformation yields compound 2. Compound 2 then undergoes two consecutive chlorinations at the C2 position, catalyzed by VCPO, to yield 4. Next, a VCPO catalyzed α-hydroxyketone rearrangement shifts the geranyl substituent from C-4 to C-3, yielding 5. Exposure of 5 to mildly basic conditions induces cyclization to yield the α-chloroepoxide, 6. This is followed by the reductive halogenation of the α-chloroepoxide to yield the hydroxynaphthoquinone, 7. Next, oxidation at the C-2 position and facile E/Z isomerization of the double bond affords the enone, 8, which undergoes a intramolecular hetero-Diels-Alder to yield debromomarinone.

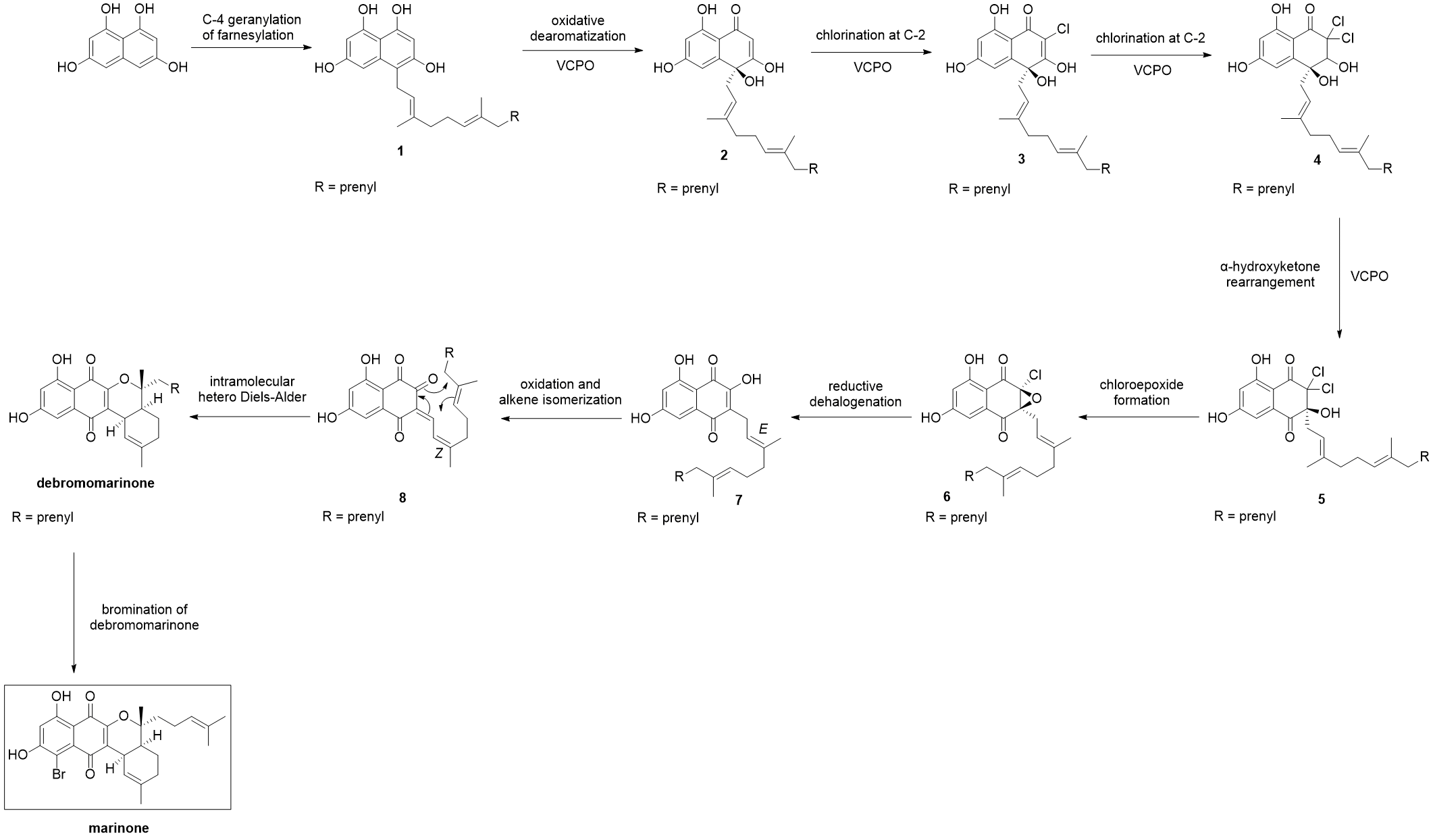
Proposed biosynthetic pathway of debromomarinine and marinone
