= Variecolol =

Names
- IUPAC name (7E,14S,19S)-5β,25-Epoxy-13,15:14,19-dicyclo-13,14-seco-2α,6α-ophiobola-7,20-dien-5α-ol
- Systematic IUPAC name [1S,2aR,2a^{1}R,4a(5)E,6aS,6bS,7S,9aS,11aR,12aS]-1,9a,11a-Trimethyl-7-(prop-1-en-2-yl)-1,2,2a^{1},4,6,6a,6b,7,8,9,9a,10,11,11a,12,12a-hexadecahydro-2aH-3-oxapentaleno[1′,6′:4,5,6]cycloocta[1,2-e]inden-2a-ol

Identifiers
CAS Number	253664-30-1
3D model (JSmol)	Interactive image
ChEMBL	ChEMBL484427
ChemSpider	4980915
PubChem CID	6480206
- InChI: InChI=1S/C25H38O2/c1-15(2)18-8-9-23(4)10-11-24(5)13-19-16(3)12-25(26)21(19)17(14-27-25)6-7-20(24)22(18)23/h6,16,18-22,26H,1,7-14H2,2-5H3/b17-6-/t16-,18+,19-,20-,21-,22-,23-,24+,25+/m0/s1 Key: KKLLBIFNYVWKON-HYWMTKJFSA-N
- SMILES: C[C@H]1C[C@@]2([C@@H]/3[C@H]1C[C@]4(CC[C@@]5(CC[C@@H]([C@H]5[C@@H]4C/C=C3/CO2)C(=C)C)C)C)O

Properties
Chemical formula	C_{25}H_{38}O_{2}
Molar mass	370.577 g·mol^{−1}
- Except where otherwise noted, data are given for materials in their standard state (at 25 °C [77 °F], 100 kPa). Infobox references

Variecolol is an immunosuppressant/antiviral compound isolated from ascomycete.

== See also ==
- Variecolin
- Variecolactone
