= Marinone =

Names
- IUPAC name (4aR,5S,12bS)-11-Bromo-8,10-dihydroxy-2,5-dimethyl-5-(4-methylpent-3-enyl)-3,4,4a,12b-tetrahydronaphtho[2,3-c]isochromene-7,12-dione

Identifiers
| 3D model (JSmol) | Interactive image |
| ChEBI | CHEBI:202893 |
| ChemSpider | 8633563 |
| PubChem CID | 10458149 |
| CompTox Dashboard (EPA) | DTXSID801028283 |
- InChI: InChI=1S/C25H27BrO5/c1-12(2)6-5-9-25(4)15-8-7-13(3)10-14(15)18-22(29)20-19(23(30)24(18)31-25)16(27)11-17(28)21(20)26/h6,10-11,14-15,27-28H,5,7-9H2,1-4H3/t14-,15+,25-/m0/s1 Key: DONXAKUQFKTOAJ-AYNSBQOLSA-N
- SMILES: CC1=C[C@H]2[C@@H](CC1)[C@](OC3=C2C(=O)C4=C(C3=O)C(=CC(=C4Br)O)O)(C)CCC=C(C)C

Properties
| Chemical formula | C_{25}H_{27}BrO_{5} |
| Molar mass | 487.390 g·mol^{−1} |

Related compounds
| Related compounds | Debromomarinone |
- Except where otherwise noted, data are given for materials in their standard state (at 25 °C [77 °F], 100 kPa). Infobox references

Marinone is an antibiotic made by marine actinomycetes.

== Biosynthesis ==
The proposed biosynthesis of marinone was first reported by Murray et al. in 2018. The biosynthesis of marinone begins with 1,3,6,8-tetrahydroxynaphthalene (THN), which is known to be biosynthesized via the condensation of five malonyl-coenzyme A units followed by the aromatization of the resulting pentaketide using a type III polyketide synthase. Next, THN undergoes geranylation or farnesylation at the C-4 position, yielding 1 (Fig. 1). This transformation is catalyzed in vivo by NphB aromatic prenyltransferase in naphterpin biosynthesis or by CnqP3 or CnqP4 in marinone biosynthesis. Then, 1 undergoes oxidative dearomatization which is catalyzed by VCPO, which is a vanadium-dependent chloroperoxidase enzyme. This transformation yields compound 2. Compound 2 then undergoes two consecutive chlorinations at the C2 position, catalyzed by VCPO, to yield 4. Next, a VCPO catalyzed α-hydroxyketone rearrangement shifts the geranyl substituent from C-4 to C-3, yielding 5. Exposure of 5 to mildly basic conditions induces cyclization to yield the α-chloroepoxide, 6. This is followed by the reductive halogenation of the α-chloroepoxide to yield the hydroxynaphthoquinone, 7. Next, oxidation at the C-2 position and facile E/Z isomerization of the double bond affords the enone, 8, which undergoes a intramolecular hetero-Diels-Alder to yield debromomarinone. Lastly, the vanadium-dependent bromoperoxidase catalyzes the bromination of debromomarinone at the C-5 position to result in the formation of marinone.

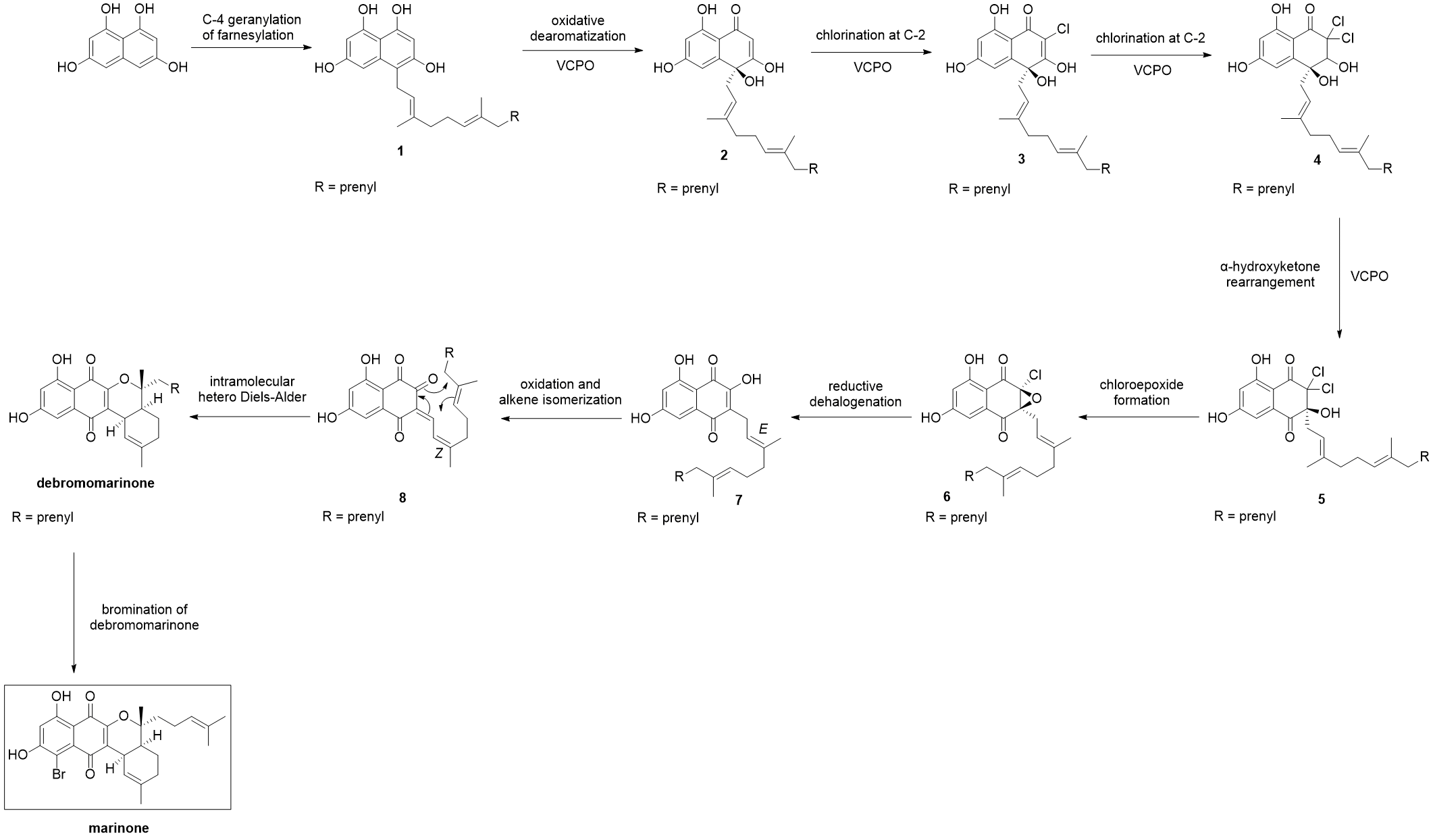
Proposed biosynthetic pathway of marinone
