= Varixanthone =

Names
- Preferred IUPAC name (2S)-3-Hydroxy-1-[(1R,2S)-11-hydroxy-5-methyl-12-oxo-1,2,3,12-tetrahydropyrano[3,2-a]xanthen-8-yl]-3-methylbutan-2-yl formate

Identifiers
| CAS Number | 419568-69-7 |
| 3D model (JSmol) | Interactive image |
| ChEBI | CHEBI:211684 |
| ChEMBL | ChEMBL469656 |
| ChemSpider | 8271705 |
| PubChem CID | 10096170 |
| CompTox Dashboard (EPA) | DTXSID701045490 |
- InChI: InChI=1S/C26H28O8/c1-12(2)15-10-32-24-13(3)8-17-20(21(24)22(15)29)23(30)19-16(28)7-6-14(25(19)34-17)9-18(33-11-27)26(4,5)31/h6-8,11,15,18,22,28-29,31H,1,9-10H2,2-5H3/t15-,18+,22-/m1/s1 Key: GOKVXLNHAYUYGV-FXCLAUTBSA-N
- SMILES: CC1=CC2=C(C3=C1OC[C@@H]([C@H]3O)C(=C)C)C(=O)C4=C(C=CC(=C4O2)C[C@@H](C(C)(C)O)OC=O)O

Properties
| Chemical formula | C_{26}H_{28}O_{8} |
| Molar mass | 468.502 g·mol^{−1} |
- Except where otherwise noted, data are given for materials in their standard state (at 25 °C [77 °F], 100 kPa). Infobox references

Varixanthone is an antimicrobial made by the marine fungus Emericella variecolor.
