= Meroterpene =

A meroterpene (or meroterpenoid) is a chemical compound having a partial terpenoid structure.

== Examples ==
=== Terpenophenolics ===
Terpenophenolics are compounds that are part terpenes, part natural phenols.

Plants in the genus Humulus and Cannabis produce terpenophenolic metabolites, such as humulone and tetrahydrocannabinol respectively. Other examples of terpenophenolics from plants include bakuchiol and lapachol.

The antibiotic marinone produced by marine bacteria is another example.

Terpenophenolics can also be isolated from animals. The terpenophenolics methoxyconidiol, epiconicol and didehydroconicol, isolated from the ascidian Aplidium aff. densum, show antiproliferative activity.
