= Evariquinone =

Names
- Preferred IUPAC name 1,2,3-Trihydroxy-8-methoxy-6-methylanthracene-9,10-dione

Identifiers
CAS Number	594860-23-8
3D model (JSmol)	Interactive image
ChemSpider	9273742
PubChem CID	11098600
UNII	8ZZ78WJX2Z
CompTox Dashboard (EPA)	DTXSID601200215
- InChI: InChI=1S/C16H12O6/c1-6-3-7-11(10(4-6)22-2)15(20)12-8(13(7)18)5-9(17)14(19)16(12)21/h3-5,17,19,21H,1-2H3 Key: DCNMIRIWFDFXKU-UHFFFAOYSA-N
- SMILES: COC1=C2C(=O)C3=C(O)C(O)=C(O)C=C3C(=O)C2=CC(C)=C1

Properties
Chemical formula	C_{16}H_{12}O_{6}
Molar mass	300.266 g·mol^{−1}
- Except where otherwise noted, data are given for materials in their standard state (at 25 °C [77 °F], 100 kPa). Infobox references

Evariquinone is a chemical compound of the anthraquinone class which has been isolated from a sponge-derived strain of the fungus Emericella variecolor and from Aspergillus versicolor.
