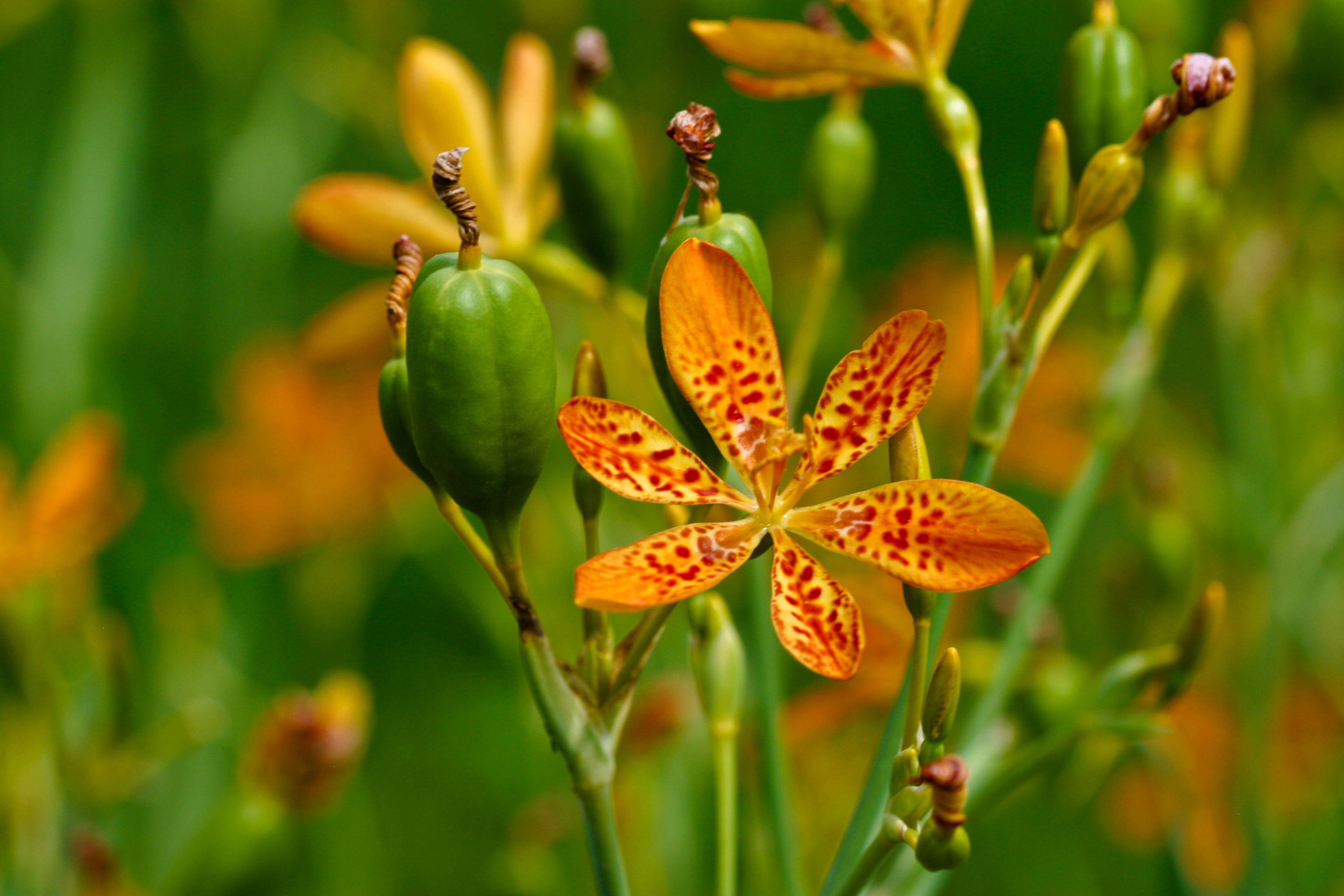
- Iris domestica growing in Pittsburgh, Pennsylvania

Scientific classification
- Kingdom: Plantae
- Clade: Tracheophytes
- Clade: Angiosperms
- Clade: Monocots
- Order: Asparagales
- Family: Iridaceae
- Genus: Iris
- Species: I. domestica

Binomial name
- Iris domestica (L.) Goldblatt & Mabb.

Synonyms
- Belamcanda chinensis (L.) DC.; Belamcanda chinensis var. curtata Makino; Belamcanda chinensis f. flava Makino; Belamcanda chinensis var. taiwanensis S.S.Ying; Belamcanda chinensis f. vulgaris Makino; Belamcanda flabellata Grey; Belamcanda pampaninii H.Lév.; Belamcanda punctata Moench [Illegitimate]; Bermudiana guttata Stokes; Epidendrum domesticum L.; Ferraria crocea Salisb.; Gemmingia chinensis (L.) Kuntze; Gemmingia chinensis f. aureoflora Makino; Gemmingia chinensis f. rubriflora Makino; Ixia chinensis L.; Ixia ensifolia Noronha; Moraea chinensis (L.) Thunb.; Moraea chinensis (L.) Collander in Thunb.; Moraea guttata Stokes; Pardanthus chinensis (L.) Ker Gawl.; Pardanthus nepalensis Sweet; Pardanthus sinensis Van Houtte; Vanilla domestica (L.) Druce

= Iris domestica =

Leopard flower

Species of flowering plant

Iris domestica, commonly known as leopard lily, blackberry lily, and leopard flower, is an ornamental plant in the family Iridaceae. In 2005, based on molecular DNA sequence evidence, Belamcanda chinensis, the sole species in the genus Belamcanda, was transferred to the genus Iris and renamed Iris domestica.

== Description ==
A perennial herb, I. domestica may grow to a height of 0.6–1 metre (2 ft 0 in – 3 ft 3 in), with its rhizomes in shallow ground, extending horizontally. It has 3-5-stems and 8–14 leaves per stem growing in a fan, with flowers ascending proximally having orange-red scattered spots of darker pigment, blooming during summer. The seed pods open in the fall, showing clusters of black, shiny seeds whose resemblance to those of a blackberry gives the plant its common name, "blackberry lily". The plant is hardy to USDA plant hardiness zone 5 and is propagated by seeds or division.

In the wild, it grows in grasslands, pastures, forest clearings, meadows, and mountainous regions or shrublands. Although it has escaped cultivation in many regions, it is not considered to have potential as an invasive species.

== Synonyms ==
Its synonyms are Epidendrum domesticum L., Vanilla domestica (L.) Druce, Belamcanda punctata Moench, Gemmingia chinensis (L.) Kuntze, Ixia chinensis L., Morea chinensis, and Pardanthus chinensis Ker Gawl.)

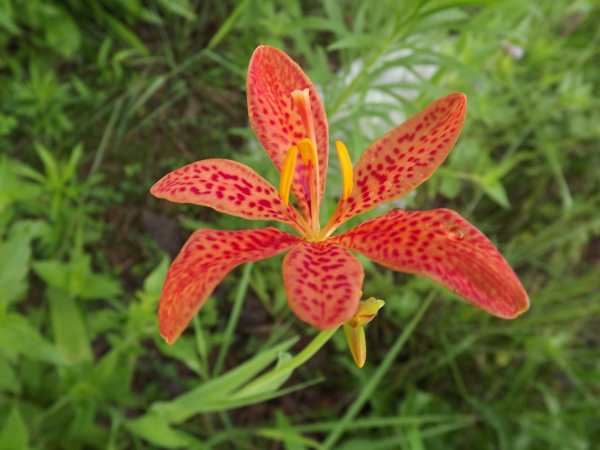
Flower petals

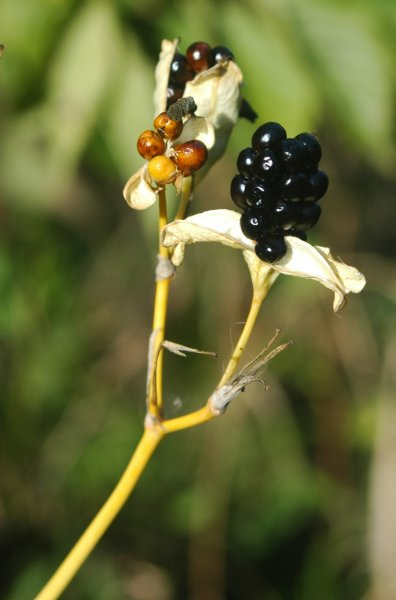
Seed pod

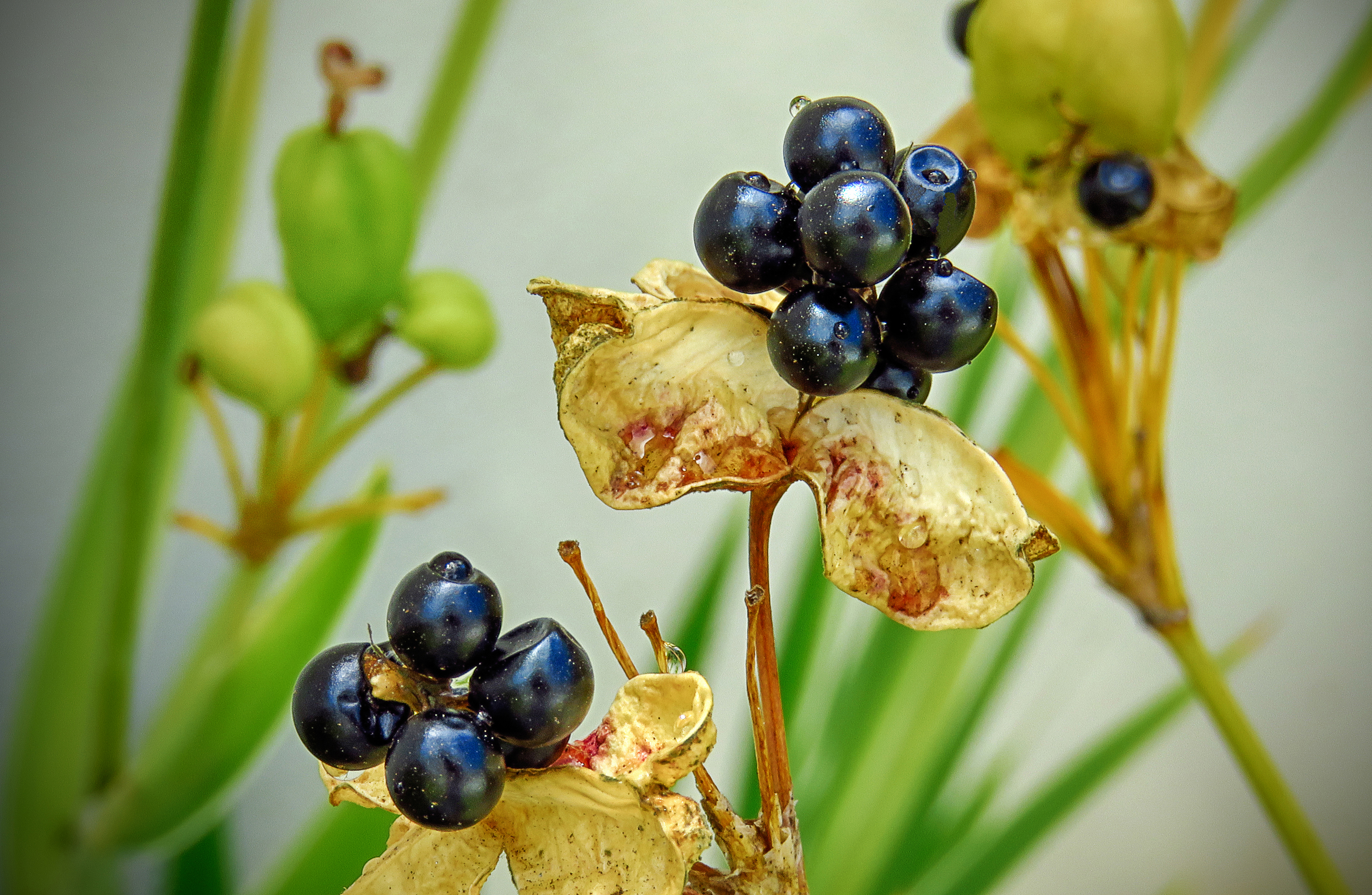
Seed pod

Seed pod

== Distribution ==
The plant is native to Eastern Asia and has been cultivated worldwide in subtropical and temperate climates. Due to the ornamental value of its attractive flowers, the plant was distributed to Europe as early as the 18th century and the United States and Caribbean countries in the 19th century.

== Uses ==
I. domestica is a common ornamental plant in private and public gardens, zoos, and floral displays. Its flowers provide nectar and pollen to insects and birds. The plant has been used in traditional medicine.

== See also ==
- List of plants known as lily

== Bibliography ==
- Pink, A. (2004). Gardening for the Million. Project Gutenberg Literary Archive Foundation.
