= Euxanthone =

Names
- Preferred IUPAC name 1,7-Dihydroxy-9H-xanthen-9-one
- Other names: 1,7-Dihydroxyxanthone; Eyxanthone; Purrenone

Identifiers
CAS Number	529-61-3
3D model (JSmol)	Interactive image
Beilstein Reference	207044
ChEBI	CHEBI:4946
ChEMBL	ChEMBL389166
ChemSpider	4444950
KEGG	C10061
PubChem CID	5281631
UNII	QN875WE9R7
CompTox Dashboard (EPA)	DTXSID00200947
- InChI: InChI=1S/C13H8O4/c14-7-4-5-10-8(6-7)13(16)12-9(15)2-1-3-11(12)17-10/h1-6,14-15H Key: KDXFPEKLLFWHMN-UHFFFAOYSA-N; InChI=1S/C13H8O4/c14-7-4-5-10-8(6-7)13(16)12-9(15)2-1-3-11(12)17-10/h1-6,14-15H Key: KDXFPEKLLFWHMN-UHFFFAOYSA-N
- SMILES: c1cc(c2c(c1)oc3ccc(cc3c2=O)O)O

Properties
Chemical formula	C_{13}H_{8}O_{4}
Molar mass	228.203 g·mol^{−1}
Melting point	240 °C (464 °F; 513 K)
- Except where otherwise noted, data are given for materials in their standard state (at 25 °C [77 °F], 100 kPa). Infobox references

Euxanthone is a naturally occurring xanthonoid, an organic compound with the molecular formula C_{13}H_{8}O_{4}. It can be synthesized from gentisic acid, β-resorcylic acid, and acetic anhydride. It occurs naturally in many plant species. Commercial production is from purified root extract of Polygala tenuifolia. It has been investigated for bioactive properties.
