= Pratensein =

- Chemical structure of pratensein

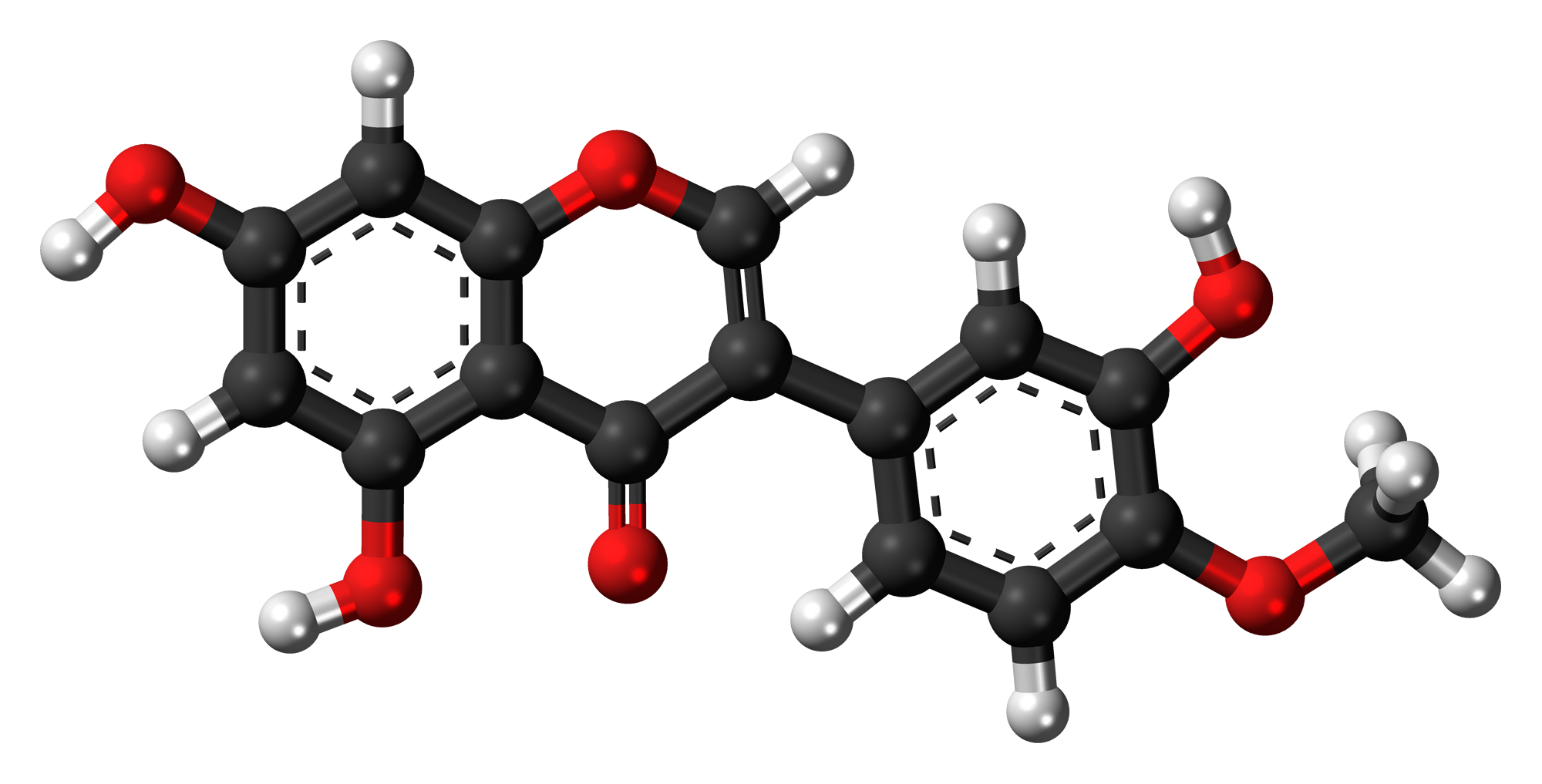

Names
- IUPAC name 3′,5,7-Trihydroxy-4′-methoxyisoflavone
- Systematic IUPAC name 5,7-Dihydroxy-3-(3-hydroxy-4-methoxyphenyl)-4H-1-benzopyran-4-one
- Other names 4′-Methoxy-3′,5,7-trihydroxyisoflavone

Identifiers
CAS Number	2284-31-3
3D model (JSmol)	Interactive image
ChEBI	CHEBI:8359
ChEMBL	ChEMBL252904
ChemSpider	4445115
ECHA InfoCard	100.347.521
KEGG	C10520
PubChem CID	5281803
UNII	D2CF8CJ6AP
CompTox Dashboard (EPA)	DTXSID60177388
- InChI: InChI=1S/C16H12O6/c1-21-13-3-2-8(4-11(13)18)10-7-22-14-6-9(17)5-12(19)15(14)16(10)20/h2-7,17-19H,1H3 Key: FPIOBTBNRZPWJW-UHFFFAOYSA-N; InChI=1/C16H12O6/c1-21-13-3-2-8(4-11(13)18)10-7-22-14-6-9(17)5-12(19)15(14)16(10)20/h2-7,17-19H,1H3 Key: FPIOBTBNRZPWJW-UHFFFAOYAF
- SMILES: COC1=C(C=C(C=C1)C2=COC3=CC(=CC(=C3C2=O)O)O)O

Properties
Chemical formula	C_{16}H_{12}O_{6}
Molar mass	300.26 g/mol
- Except where otherwise noted, data are given for materials in their standard state (at 25 °C [77 °F], 100 kPa). verify (what is ?) Infobox references

Pratensein is an O-methylated isoflavone, a type of flavonoid. It can be found in Trifolium pratense (red clover) and can have effects for the prevention of atherosclerosis.
