= Isoemericellin =

Names
- Preferred IUPAC name 8-Hydroxy-1-(hydroxymethyl)-3-methyl-7-(3-methylbut-2-en-1-yl)-2-[(3-methylbut-2-en-1-yl)oxy]-9H-xanthen-9-one

Identifiers
CAS Number	594860-24-9
3D model (JSmol)	Interactive image
ChEBI	CHEBI:227314
ChemSpider	552896
PubChem CID	637262
CompTox Dashboard (EPA)	DTXSID201045538
- InChI: InChI=1S/C25H28O5/c1-14(2)6-7-17-8-9-19-22(23(17)27)24(28)21-18(13-26)25(29-11-10-15(3)4)16(5)12-20(21)30-19/h6,8-10,12,26-27H,7,11,13H2,1-5H3 Key: MDBQNLFOBADTEY-UHFFFAOYSA-N; InChI=1/C25H28O5/c1-14(2)6-7-17-8-9-19-22(23(17)27)24(28)21-18(13-26)25(29-11-10-15(3)4)16(5)12-20(21)30-19/h6,8-10,12,26-27H,7,11,13H2,1-5H3 Key: MDBQNLFOBADTEY-UHFFFAOYAR
- SMILES: C/C(C)=C\Cc3ccc2Oc1cc(C)c(OC\C=C(/C)C)c(CO)c1C(=O)c2c3O

Properties
Chemical formula	C_{25}H_{28}O_{5}
Molar mass	408.494 g·mol^{−1}
- Except where otherwise noted, data are given for materials in their standard state (at 25 °C [77 °F], 100 kPa). Infobox references

Isoemericellin is a chemical compound isolated from the marine fungus Emericella variecolor.
