= Variecolin =

Names
- IUPAC name (3S,3aS,3bS,5E,6aR,9S,9aS,10aR,12aS)-9,10a,12a-Trimethyl-7-oxo-3-(prop-1-en-2-yl)-1,2,3,3a,3b,4,6a,7,8,9,9a,10,10a,11,12,12a-hexadecahydrobenzo[4,5]cycloocta[1,2-e]indene-6-carbaldehyde

Identifiers
CAS Number	133101-16-3
3D model (JSmol)	Interactive image
ChEBI	CHEBI:66349
ChemSpider	4980914
PubChem CID	6480205
UNII	RYL8QSN52U
CompTox Dashboard (EPA)	DTXSID701045557
- InChI: InChI=1S/C25H36O2/c1-15(2)18-8-9-24(4)10-11-25(5)13-19-16(3)12-21(27)22(19)17(14-26)6-7-20(25)23(18)24/h6,14,16,18-20,22-23H,1,7-13H2,2-5H3/b17-6-/t16-,18+,19-,20-,22-,23-,24-,25+/m0/s1 Key: XAYQASOMEVLRKN-NOJNFTMQSA-N; InChI=1/C25H36O2/c1-15(2)18-8-9-24(4)10-11-25(5)13-19-16(3)12-21(27)22(19)17(14-26)6-7-20(25)23(18)24/h6,14,16,18-20,22-23H,1,7-13H2,2-5H3/b17-6-/t16-,18+,19-,20-,22-,23-,24-,25+/m0/s1 Key: XAYQASOMEVLRKN-NOJNFTMQBM
- SMILES: C[C@H]1CC(=O)[C@@H]/2[C@H]1C[C@]3(CC[C@@]4(CC[C@@H]([C@H]4[C@@H]3C/C=C2/C=O)C(=C)C)C)C

Properties
Chemical formula	C_{25}H_{36}O_{2}
Molar mass	368.561 g·mol^{−1}
- Except where otherwise noted, data are given for materials in their standard state (at 25 °C [77 °F], 100 kPa). Infobox references

Variecolin is a terpenoid isolated from an ascomycete.

== See also ==
- Variecolol
- Variecolactone
