= Variecolactone =

Names
- IUPAC name (7E,14S,19S)-5α-Hydroxy-5β,25-epoxy-13,15:14,19-dicyclo-13,14-seco-2α,6α-ophiobola-7,20-dien-25-one
- Systematic IUPAC name [1S,2aR,2a^{1}R,4a(5)E,6aS,6bS,7S,9aS,11aR,12aS]-2a-Hydroxy-1,9a,11a-trimethyl-7-(prop-1-en-2-yl)-1,2,2a,2a^{1},6,6a,6b,7,8,9,9a,10,11,11a,12,12a-hexadecahydro-4H-3-oxapentaleno[1′,6′:4,5,6]cycloocta[1,2-a]inden-4-one

Identifiers
CAS Number	216445-01-1
3D model (JSmol)	Interactive image
ChEBI	CHEBI:219320
ChemSpider	8244156
PubChem CID	10068616
CompTox Dashboard (EPA)	DTXSID401336052
- InChI: InChI=1S/C25H36O3/c1-14(2)16-8-9-23(4)10-11-24(5)13-18-15(3)12-25(27)20(18)17(22(26)28-25)6-7-19(24)21(16)23/h6,15-16,18-21,27H,1,7-13H2,2-5H3/b17-6+/t15-,16+,18-,19-,20-,21-,23-,24+,25+/m0/s1 Key: FHJWMBGJDFBYNQ-SSPKKXFYSA-N
- SMILES: C[C@H]1C[C@@]2([C@@H]/3[C@H]1C[C@]4(CC[C@@]5(CC[C@@H]([C@H]5[C@@H]4C/C=C3/C(=O)O2)C(=C)C)C)C)O

Properties
Chemical formula	C_{25}H_{36}O_{3}
Molar mass	384.560 g·mol^{−1}
- Except where otherwise noted, data are given for materials in their standard state (at 25 °C [77 °F], 100 kPa). Infobox references

Variecolactone is a bio-active ascomycete isolate.

== See also ==
- Variecolin
- Variecolol
