= Sponge isolates =

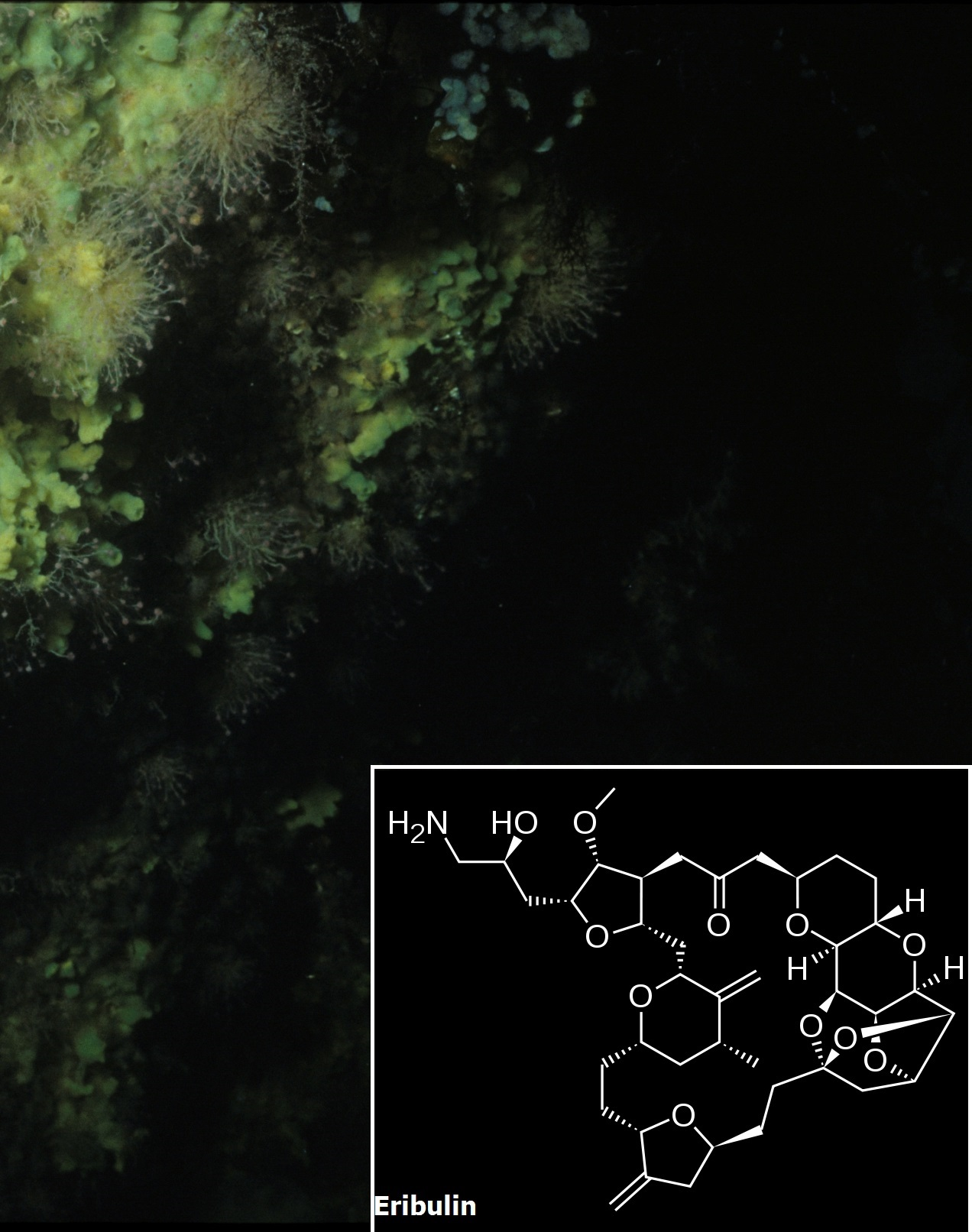
Halichondria produces the eribulin (Halaven) precursor halichondrin B

Lacking an immune system, protective shell, or mobility, sponges have developed an ability to synthesize a variety of unusual compounds for survival. C-nucleosides isolated from Caribbean Cryptotethya crypta, were the basis for the synthesis of zidovudine (AZT), aciclovir (Cyclovir), cytarabine (Depocyt), and cytarabine derivative gemcitabine (Gemzar).

Isolate	Source	Researched activity / Chemical description
3-Alkylpyridinium (3-AP)	Haplosclerida	hemolytic and cytotoxic
Agosterol A		anticancer
Aplyzanzine A	Aplysina sp.	
Avarol	Dysidea avara	antitumor, antimicrobial, and antiviral
Aciculitin	Aciculites ciliate	antifungal cyclic peptide
Discodermin	Discodermia kiiensis	antimicrobial tetradecapeptide
Dysidenin	Lamellodysidea herbacea	highly toxic
Girolline	Girolline	inhibits protein synthesis
Halichondrin B	Halichondria okadai Kadota (Miura Peninsula)	precursor to eribulin (Halaven)
Halicylindramide	Halichondria	antifungal peptide
Hymenamides	Phakellia fusca	proline-containing cyclopeptide
Hymenistatin	Phakellia fusca	bio-active proline-containing cyclopeptide
Hyrtinadine A	Hyrtios	bio-active bis-indole alkaloid
Manzamines	various sponge species	bio-active β-carbolines
Mirabamide	Siliquariaspongia mirabilis	antiviral depsipeptide
Neamphamide A	Neamphius huxleyi	antiviral depsipeptide
Onnamide A	Theonella swinhoei	cytotoxic, inhibits protein synthesis
Peloruside A	Mycale sp. (New Zealand)	cytotoxic / structurally similar to bryostatin
Phakellistatins	Phakellia fusca	proline-containing cyclopeptides
Phoriospongin	Phoriospongia and Callyspongia bilamellata	nematocidal compound
Plakevulin A	Plakortis	DNA polymerase inhibitor
Plakoridine A	Plakortis	
Polydiscamide B	Ircinia	the first example of a nonendogenous human SNSR (human sensory neuron-specific G protein couple receptor) agonist
Ptilomycalin A	Monanchora arbuscula	antifungal spirocyclic guanidine alkaloid / laccase and melanization inhibitor
Sceptrin	Agelas conifera	antibiotic
Suberedamine	Suberea	
Theonellamide F	Theonella	antimicrobial/antifungal cytotoxic bicyclic dodecapeptide
Topsentolides	Topsentia	cytotoxic oxylipins
Xestoquinone	Xestospongia	antimalarial, antifungal, and cytotoxic

Semisynthetic analogs of the sponge isolate jasplakinolide, were submitted to National Cancer Institute’s Biological Evaluation Committee in 2011.

== Other marine isolates ==
Trabectedin, aplidine, didemnin, were isolated from sea squirts. Monomethyl auristatin E is a derivative of a dolastatin 10, a compound made by Dolabella auricularia. Bryostatins were first isolated from Bryozoa.

Salinosporamides are derived from Salinispora tropica. Ziconotide is derived from the sea snail Conus magus.

== See also ==
- Bacillus isolates
- Biotechnology in pharmaceutical manufacturing
- Fungal isolates
- Marine pharmacognosy
- Medicinal molds
- Streptomyces isolates
