= Marine pharmacognosy =

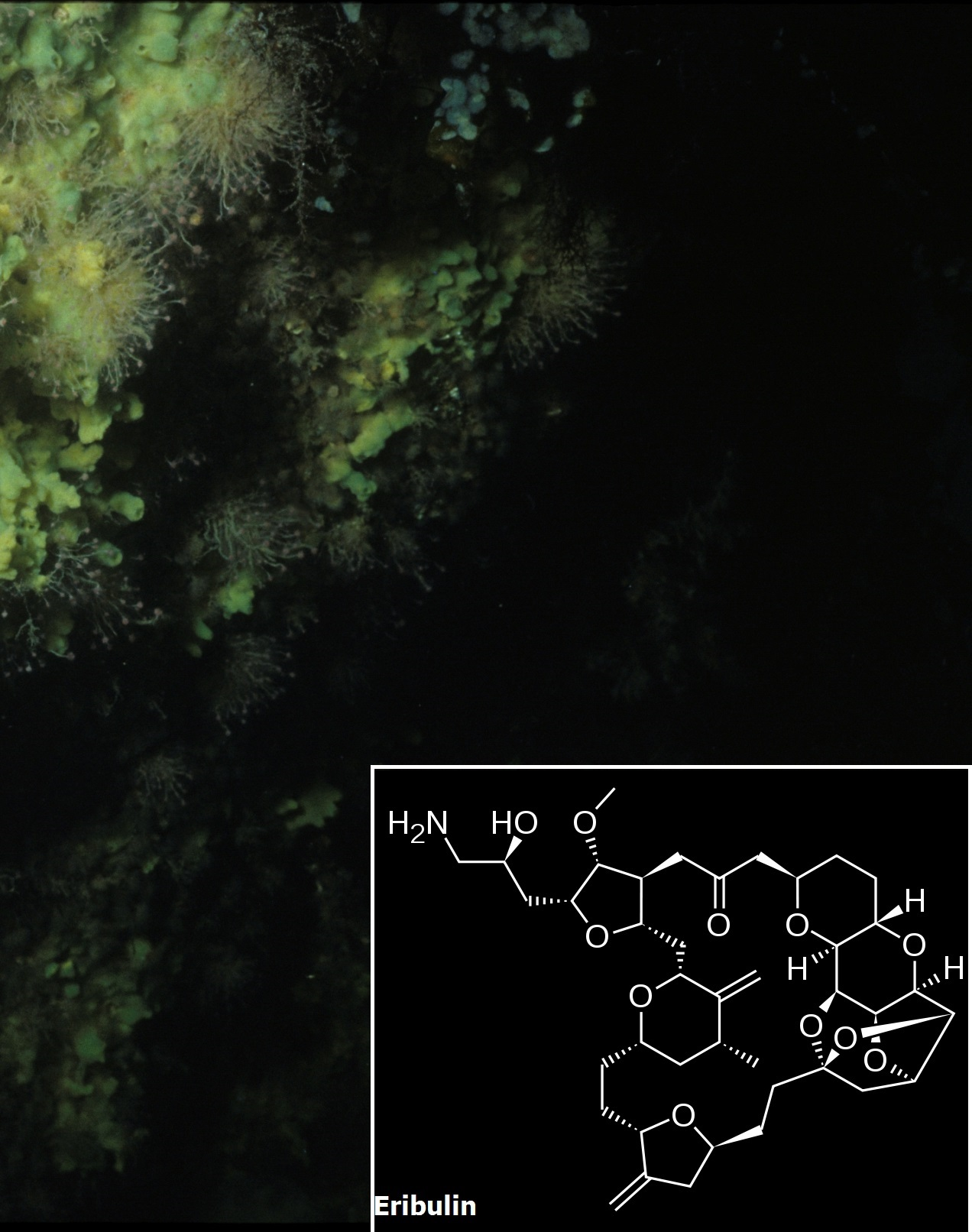
Halichondria produces the eribulin (Halaven) precursor halichondrin B

Marine pharmacognosy is the investigation and identification of medically important plants and animals in the marine environment. It is a sub branch of terrestrial pharmacognosy. Generally the drugs are obtained from the marine species of bacteria, virus, algae, fungi and sponges. It is a relatively new field of study in western medicine, although many marine organisms were used in traditional Chinese medicine. It was not until 2004 that the first FDA approval of a drug came directly from the sea: ziconotide, which was isolated from a marine cone snail.

With 79% of the Earth's surface covered by water, research into the chemistry of marine organisms is relatively unexplored and represents a vast resource for new medicines to combat major diseases such as cancer, AIDS or malaria. Research typically focuses on sessile organisms or slow moving animals because of their inherent need for chemical defenses.

Standard research involves an extraction of the organism in a suitable solvent followed by either an assay of this crude extract for a particular disease target or a rationally guided isolation of new chemical compounds using standard chromatography techniques.

== Marine organisms as sources of natural products ==
Over 70% of the Earth's surface is covered by oceans which contain 95% of the Earth's biosphere. It was over 3500 million years ago that organisms first appeared in the sea. Over time, they have evolved many different mechanisms to survive the various harsh environments which include extreme temperatures, salinity, pressure, different levels of aeration and radiation, overcoming effects of mutation, and combating infection, fouling and overgrowth by other organisms. Adaptations to survive the different environments could be by physical or chemical adaptation. Organisms with no apparent physical defense, like sessile organisms, are believed to have evolved chemical defenses to protect themselves. It is also believed that the compounds would have to be extremely potent due to the dilution effect of seawater. This has been described to be analogues to pheromones but with the purpose of repelling instead of attracting. As well, predators have evolved chemical weapons in order to paralyze or kill prey. Conus magus is an example of a cone snail that has a poisoned harpoon-like projectile which it uses to paralyze prey like small fish. Some organisms, like the Viperfish, are believed to attract small fish or prey by using its photophore.

Many different marine organisms have been explored for bioactive compounds. Some vertebrate animals include fish, sharks and snakes. Some examples of invertebrates are sponges, coelenterates, tunicates, echinoderms, corals, algae, molluscs and bryozoans. Some microorganisms include bacteria, fungi and cyanobacteria.

== True producer ==
There is an ongoing debate on what organisms are the actual true producers of some compounds. About 40% of the biomass of sponges can be from microorganisms. It's not surprising that some compounds may actually be produced by symbiotic microorganisms rather than the host.

== Biological diversity in marine environments ==
Marine environments are considered more biologically diverse than terrestrial environments. Thirty-two different animal phyla are represented in the oceans of the 33 recognized phyla. Fifteen different phyla are represented only in marine environments, while only 1 is exclusively terrestrial. Marine phyla also contain functionally unique organisms such as filter feeders and sessile organisms which have no terrestrial counterpart. Also, marine autotrophs are more diverse than their terrestrial counterparts this is extremely important. Marine autotrophs are believed to stem from at least 8 ancient clades while terrestrial organisms mainly stem from one clade, Embyrophyta. Marine environments may contain over 80% of the world's plant and animal species. The diversity of coral reefs can be extraordinary with species diversity reaching 1000 species per meter squared. The greatest marine tropical biodiversity is reported to be in the Indo-Pacific Ocean.

== Sample collection technological requirements ==
Collecting marine samples can range from very simple and inexpensive to very complicated expensive. Samples from near or on shores are readily accessible via beach combing, wading or snorkeling. Sample collection from deep water can be completed via dredging however, this is a very invasive technique which destroys the local habitat, does not allow for repeated sampling from the same location and compromises sample integrity. Corers can be used for sediment sample collection from deep locations quickly, easily and inexpensively. SCUBA diving was introduced in the 1940s however, it was not widely used until it became popular in the 1970s. SCUBA diving is limited in the duration that divers can spend underwater when conducted from the surface. If prolonged dives were necessary, an underwater laboratory could be used. Aquarius is the only underwater laboratory dedicated to marine science. For sample collection from depths that cannot be achieved by SCUBA diving, submersibles may be used. Sample collection by submersibles can be extremely expensive with costs for a submersible, support ship, technicians and support staff ranging between $10,000 to $45,000 per day.

== Chemical compound isolation ==
For the isolation of biologically active compounds from organisms, several different steps need to be completed. The different steps required to obtain a biologically active compound are: Extraction, chromatographic purification, dereplication, structure elucidation and bioassay testing. The steps do not have to follow that particular order and many steps may be completed simultaneously. In the first step, the sample may be triturated and extracted with a suitable solvent or macerated. Some solvents used are methanol:chloroform, ethanol, acetonitrile, or others. The purpose is to remove organic compounds that have a medium polarity which are considered more "drug-like". Ideally, polar compounds like salts, peptides, sugars as well as very non-polar compounds like lipids are left behind to simplify chromatography since they are not generally considered "drug-like". Drying of the sample could be completed before extraction by lyophilisation to remove any excess water and therefore limit the amount of highly polar compounds extracted.

The next step depends on the methodology of individual laboratories. Bioassay-guided fractionation is a common method to find biologically active compounds. This involves testing the crude extract or preliminary fractions from chromatography in an assay or multiple assays, determining what fractions or crude extracts show activity in the specific assays, and further fractionating the active fractions or extracts. This step is then repeated where the new fractions are tested and the active fractions are further fractionated. This continues until the fraction only contains one compound. Dereplication is ideally performed as early as possible to determine if the active compound has been previously reported in order to prevent "rediscovering" a compound. This can be performed using Liquid Chromatography- Mass Spectrometry (LC-MS) data or Nuclear Magnetic Resonance (NMR) data obtained in the biological assay-guided process and then comparing the information to that found in databases of previously reported compounds.

Structure elucidation is performed by using NMR data obtained of the compound and High Resolution Mass Spectrometry (HR-MS) Data. Tandem Mass Spectrometry can also be useful, especially for large molecules like glycolipids, proteins, polysaccharides or peptides. Completed characterization for publication purposes may require Infrared (IR), Ultraviolet-visible (UV-vis), specific rotation and melting point data. Obtaining a crystal structure via X-ray crystallography can greatly accelerate and simplify structure elucidation however, obtaining crystals can be quite difficult.

There are many different bioassays available for testing. There are anticancer, antimicrobial, antiviral, anti-inflammatory, antiparasitic, anticholesterolemic, and many other different assays. For MTT assay and cytosolic Lactate dehydrogenase (LDH) release are common cytotoxicity or cell viability assays.

== Supply issue ==
A common problem that plagues drug development is obtaining a sustainable supply of the compound. Compounds isolated from invertebrates can be difficult to obtain in sufficient quantity for clinical trials. Synthesis is an alternate source of the compound of interest if the compound is simple otherwise, it is generally not a viable alternative. Aqua culture is another alternative if the organism is readily grown otherwise, it may not be good sustainable source of a compound. Also, the small quantity the compound is usually found in from organisms makes this alternative even more expensive. For example, ET-743 (INN name trabectedin, brand name Yondelis) can be isolated from the tunicate Ecteinascidia turbinata with a yield of 2 g per ton. This would require thousands of tons of tunicate to be grown and extracted to produce the kilograms of ET-743 that would be required for the treatment of thousands of people. Some success has been had in producing compounds of interest from microorganisms. Microorganisms can be used as a sustainable source for the production of compounds of interest. They can also be used for the production of intermediates so that semisynthesis can be used to produce the final compound. This has been achieved for ET-743 with the production of the intermediate Safracin B from Pseudomonas fluoresens and the subsequent semisynthesis into ET-743. This is currently the industrial production method for the production of Yondelis.

== Compounds from marine sources in clinical level ==
Clinical Pipeline of Marine Pharmacology, January 2022. From https://www.marinepharmacology.org/
Clinical Status	Compound Name	Trademark	Marine Organism^{α}	Chemical Class	Molecular Target	Clinical Trials^{β}	Disease Area
FDA-Approved	Cytarabine (Ara-C)	Cytosar-U	Sponge	Nucleoside	DNA Polymerase	>50/711	Cancer
FDA-Approved	Vidarabine (Ara-A)	Vira-A	Sponge	Nucleoside	Viral DNA Polymerase	0	Antiviral
FDA-Approved	Ziconotide	Prialt	Cone Snail	Peptide	N-Type Ca^{2+} Channel	2/5	Analgesic
FDA-Approved	Eribulin Mesylate (E7389)	Halaven	Sponge	Macrolide	Microtubules	19/27	Cancer
FDA-Approved	Omega-3-Fatty Acid Ethyl Esters	Lovaza	Fish	Omega-3 Fatty Acids	Triglyceride-Synthesizing Enzymes	45/94	Hypertriglyceridemia
FDA-Approved	Trabectedin (ET-743) EU Approved only	Yondelis	Tunicate	Alkaloid	Minor Groove of DNA	17/34	Cancer
Phase III	Brentuximab Vedotin (SGN-35)	Adcetris	Mollusk	Antibody-Drug Conjugate (MM Auristatin E)	CD30 and Microtubules	9/19	Cancer
Phase III	Plitidepsin	Aplidin	Tunicate	Depsipeptide	Rac1 and JNK Activation	1/7	Cancer
Phase II	DMXBA (GTS-21)	N/A	Worm	Alkaloid	Alpha-7 Nicotinic Acetylcholine Receptor	0/3	Cognition, Schizophrenia
Phase II	Plinabulin (NPI 2358)	N/A	Fungus	Diketopiperazine	Microtubules and JNK Stress Protein	1/2	Cancer
Phase II	Elisidepsin	Irvalec	Mollusk	Depsipeptide	Plasma Membrane Fluidity	1/2	Cancer
Phase II	PM00104	Zalypsis	Nudibranch	Alkaloid	DNA-Binding	2/3	Cancer
Phase II	Glembatumumab Vedotin (CDX-011)	N/A	Mollusk	Antibody Drug Conjugate (MM Auristatin E)	Glycoprotein NMB and Microtubules	1/3	Cancer
Phase I	Marizomib (Salinosporamide A)	N/A	Bacterium	Beta-Lactone-Gamma Lactam	20S Proteasome	4/4	Cancer
Phase I	PM01183	N/A	Tunicate	Alkaloid	Minor Groove of DNA	N/A	Cancer
Phase I	SGN-75	N/A	Mollusk	Antibody Drug Conjugate (MM Auristatin F)	CD70 and Microtubules	2/2	Cancer
Phase I	ASG-5ME	N/A	Mollusk	Antibody Drug Conjugate (MM auristatin E)	ASG-5 and Microtubules	2/2	Cancer
Phase I	Hemiasterlin (E7974)	N/A	Sponge	Tripeptide	Microtubules	0/3	Cancer
Phase I	Bryostatin 1	N/A	Bryozoa	Polyketide	Protein Kinase C	0/38	Cancer, Alzheimers
Phase I	Pseudopterosins	N/A	Soft Coral	Diterpene Glycoside	Eicosanoid Metabolism	N/A	Wound Healing

^{α}Includes natural products or natural product derivatives or analogues; ^{β}Number of active trials/number of total trials from http://www.clinicaltrials.gov/ as of July 2011

== See also ==
- Sponge isolates
