= Papuamide =

Group of chemical compounds

Papuamides A and B are depsipeptides which appear to protect T cells from HIV. They were isolated from the sponge Theonella, and are part of a larger group of structurally similar depsipeptides—also isolated from sponges—including neamphamide A, callipeltin A, and mirabamides A-D.

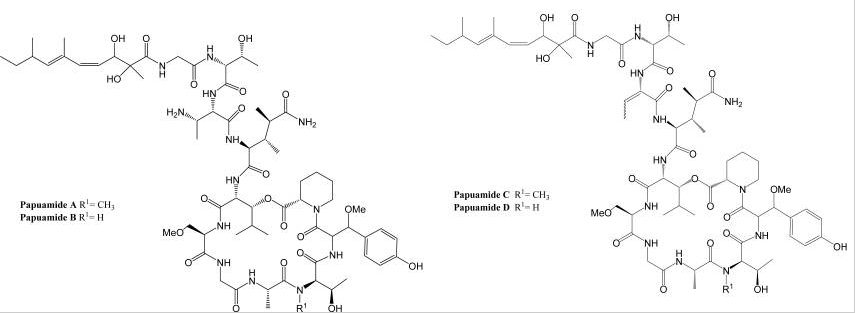
