= C20H14O4 =

The molecular formula C_{20}H_{14}O_{4} (molar mass: 318.32 g/mol) may refer to:

- diphenyl isophthalate (CA number 744-45-6)
- diphenyl terephthalate (CAS number 1539-04-4)
- phenolphthalein (CAS number 77-09-8)
- resorcinol dibenzoate (CAS number 94-01-9)
- xestoquinone
