= Bacillus isolates =

Species of bacterium

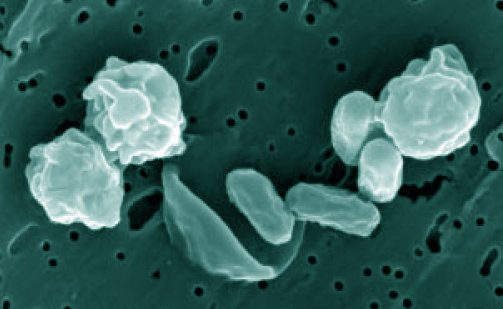
Bacillus odysseyi

Bacillus isolates have a variety of biotechnological applications.

== Nattō-derived ==
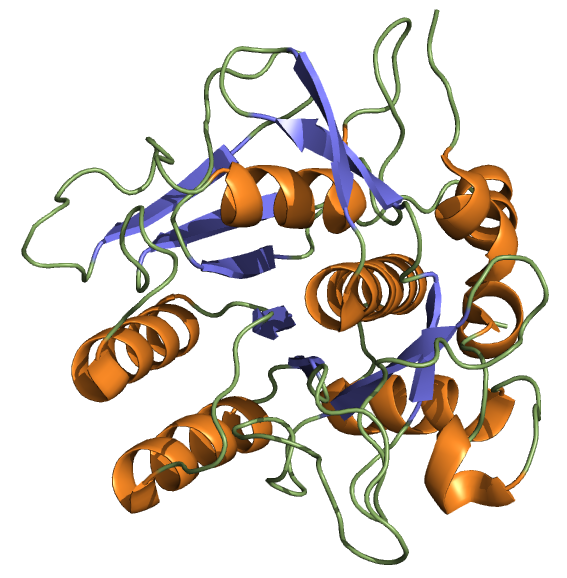
Crystal structure of nattokinase from Bacillus subtilis natto. PDB 4dww

Nattō-derived Bacillus isolates include nootropics pyrazine and tetramethylpyrazine, as well as the anticoagulant enzyme nattokinase.

== Biotechnology ==
Bacillus is utilized in the production of the chemotherapy medicine L-asparaginase. Bacillus subtilis is utilized in the production of hyaluronic acid and α-amylase. Bacillus thuringiensis isolates are utilized as biopesticides.

Bacillus megaterium has been an important industrial organism for decades. It produces penicillin amidase used to make synthetic penicillin, various amylases used in the baking industry and glucose dehydrogenase used in glucose blood tests. B. megaterium is also used for the production of pyruvate, vitamin B12, drugs with fungicidal and antiviral properties, etc. It produces enzymes for modifying corticosteroids, as well as several amino acid dehydrogenases.

Bacillus subtilis can biosynthesize silver nanoparticles. Bacillus badius can be used to cleaves penicillin G to 6-amino penicillanic acid (6-APA) and phenyl acetic acid (PAA). Certain Bacillus have mycorrhiza-like activity and potential bioremediation applications.

Bacillus isolates are used industrially as nutritional probiotics. Additional Bacillus isolates include gamma-D-Glutamyl-meso-diaminopimelate peptidase, sonorensin, gamma-cyclodextrin, 2,5-Diketopiperazines, laccases, bacteriocin, paenicidin A, tridecaptin A₁, and paenicidin B.

== See also ==
- Bacillus subtilis, a culinary/industrial bacterium used to produce a number of fermented soy products
- Biotechnology in pharmaceutical manufacturing
- Corynebacterium glutamicum, the industrial/pharmaceutical bacterium responsible for manufacturing a number of amino acids
- Erwinia chrysanthemi, a bacterium used to produce the chemotherapy medicine asparaginase
- Fungal isolates
- Medicinal molds
- Sponge isolates
- Streptomyces isolates
