= Argadin =

Identifiers
CAS Number	289665-92-5
3D model (JSmol)	Interactive image
ChEMBL	ChEMBL445236
ChemSpider	395740
DrugBank	DB04350
PubChem CID	449123
CompTox Dashboard (EPA)	DTXSID40332296
- InChI: InChI=1S/C29H42N10O9/c1-15(40)34-29(30)32-9-3-6-18-27(47)38-10-4-7-20(38)25(45)37-19-12-22(41)39(28(19)48)21(11-16-13-31-14-33-16)26(46)35-17(24(44)36-18)5-2-8-23(42)43/h13-14,17-22,41H,2-12H2,1H3,(H,31,33)(H,35,46)(H,36,44)(H,37,45)(H,42,43)(H3,30,32,34,40)/t17-,18-,19-,20+,21-,22+/m0/s1 Key: FOZYKTUSOWWQGR-KNPYFFGGSA-N; InChI=1/C29H42N10O9/c1-15(40)34-29(30)32-9-3-6-18-27(47)38-10-4-7-20(38)25(45)37-19-12-22(41)39(28(19)48)21(11-16-13-31-14-33-16)26(46)35-17(24(44)36-18)5-2-8-23(42)43/h13-14,17-22,41H,2-12H2,1H3,(H,31,33)(H,35,46)(H,36,44)(H,37,45)(H,42,43)(H3,30,32,34,40)/t17-,18-,19-,20+,21-,22+/m0/s1 Key: FOZYKTUSOWWQGR-KNPYFFGGBM
- SMILES: O=C1N2[C@H](O)C[C@@H]1NC(=O)[C@@H]4N(C(=O)[C@@H](NC(=O)[C@@H](NC(=O)[C@@H]2Cc3c[nH]cn3)CCCC(=O)O)CCC/N=C(\N)NC(=O)C)CCC4

Properties
Chemical formula	C_{29}H_{42}N_{10}O_{9}
Molar mass	674.7 g/mol
- Except where otherwise noted, data are given for materials in their standard state (at 25 °C [77 °F], 100 kPa). verify (what is ?) Infobox references

Argadin is a cyclic peptide natural product, investigated for its ability to be a nanomolar inhibitor of Family-18 Chitinases.
