= C26H38O6 =

The molecular formula C_{26}H_{38}O_{6} may refer to:

- Hydrocortisone valerate
- Pseudopterosin E
