= Aciculitin =

Group of chemical compounds

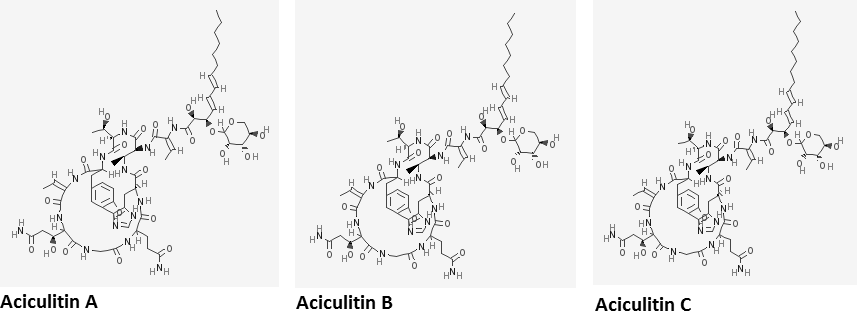
Aciculitins A-C

Aciculitins are antifungal cyclic peptides isolated from a marine sponge. There are 3 Aciculitins that are isolated from the Lithistid sponge Aciculites orientalis that differ by their homologous lipid residues.

Aciculitin D is a similar cyclic peptide to Aciculitin A-C. It was isolated from Poecillastra sp. marine sponge that is collected from the deep sea. Based on its molecular formula, Aciculitin D is the most similar to Aciculitin B structure wise since they only differ in one amino acid substitution. The structure of Aciculitin B contains one extra glutamine while the structure of Aciculitin D has one extra L-Threonine. Although the two cyclic peptides contain slightly different amino acids, they still have the same overall charge because both glutamine and L-Threonine are considered neutral amino acids.

== Cytotoxicity ==
Aciculitin A-C exhibits cytotoxicity against human colon tumor cell line HCT-116 with IC_{50} value of 0.5 μg/mL.

Aciculitin D exhibits cytotoxicity against human colon tumor cell line HCT-116 with IC_{50} value of 0.51 μM. Aciculitin D also exhibits cytotoxicity against HeLa, human cervical cells with IC_{50} value of 0.57 μM.
