= Split-intein circular ligation of peptides and proteins =

Biotechnology technique

Split-intein circular ligation of peptides and proteins (SICLOPPS) is a biotechnology technique that permits the creation of cyclic peptides. These peptides are produced by ribosomal protein synthesis, followed by an intein-like event that splices the protein into a loop. By contrast with the nonribosomal peptide synthetases that produces some cyclic peptides like gramicidin S, SICLOPPS offers the advantage that the peptides' structure can be encoded by DNA in a simple manner according to the genetic code, but for this reason it imposes limitations on the types of amino acids incorporated that are comparable to those that apply to ordinary proteins. As implemented there is also some constraint on the peptide sequence of the cyclic sequence; for example, libraries may use the sequence SGXX..XXPL to increase the efficiency of circularization of the peptide. SICLOPPS is frequently used with a library of randomized DNA sequence that permits the simultaneous production and screening of large numbers of constructs at once, followed by the recovery of the DNA sequences responsible for the activity of the clone of interest.

A number of natural antimicrobial peptides are cyclic, and the products of SICLOPPS are "increasingly viewed as ideal backbones for modulation of protein-protein interactions." Circular peptides tend to be resistant to protease activity, and may be suitable for use as orally administered drugs. Once a cyclic peptide is identified with a biological activity of interest, it may also be possible to identify the target of the peptide (a gene that encodes a protein with which it interacts) by functional complementation, facilitating a better understanding of its mechanism of action.

== See also ==
- combinatorial chemistry
- exon shuffling - note that although introns are conceptually analogous to inteins, they apply to a different molecule (RNA) and are processed by RNA splicing at a different time and location within the cell.
