= Pseudopterosin =

Pseudopterosin may refer to:

- Pseudopterosin A
- Pseudopterosin E
