= Yunnanin A =

Identifiers
CAS Number	152340-02-8
3D model (JSmol)	Interactive image
Abbreviations	cyclo[Gly-Gly-Tyr-Gly-Pro-Phe-Pro]
ChEMBL	ChEMBL452902
ChemSpider	24687587
PubChem CID	44584206
CompTox Dashboard (EPA)	DTXSID101045442
- InChI: InChI=1S/C34H41N7O8/c42-23-12-10-22(11-13-23)16-24-31(46)37-20-30(45)40-14-4-9-27(40)33(48)39-25(17-21-6-2-1-3-7-21)34(49)41-15-5-8-26(41)32(47)36-18-28(43)35-19-29(44)38-24/h1-3,6-7,10-13,24-27,42H,4-5,8-9,14-20H2,(H,35,43)(H,36,47)(H,37,46)(H,38,44)(H,39,48)/t24-,25-,26-,27-/m0/s1 Key: GIKMZVPXQPZWDF-FWEHEUNISA-N; InChI=1/C34H41N7O8/c42-23-12-10-22(11-13-23)16-24-31(46)37-20-30(45)40-14-4-9-27(40)33(48)39-25(17-21-6-2-1-3-7-21)34(49)41-15-5-8-26(41)32(47)36-18-28(43)35-19-29(44)38-24/h1-3,6-7,10-13,24-27,42H,4-5,8-9,14-20H2,(H,35,43)(H,36,47)(H,37,46)(H,38,44)(H,39,48)/t24-,25-,26-,27-/m0/s1 Key: GIKMZVPXQPZWDF-FWEHEUNIBH
- SMILES: C1C[C@H]2C(=O)N[C@H](C(=O)N3CCC[C@H]3C(=O)NCC(=O)NCC(=O)N[C@H](C(=O)NCC(=O)N2C1)CC4=CC=C(C=C4)O)CC5=CC=CC=C5

Properties
Chemical formula	C_{34}H_{41}N_{7}O_{8}
Molar mass	675.743 g·mol^{−1}
- Except where otherwise noted, data are given for materials in their standard state (at 25 °C [77 °F], 100 kPa). Infobox references

Yunnanin A is a biologically active cyclic peptide. This four-amino acid peptide is a weak anti-inflammatory and weak anti-microbial.
