= Viscumamide =

Chemical compound

Names
- IUPAC name Cyclo(isoleucylleucylisoleucylleucylleucyl)
- Other names Cyclic(L-isoleucyl-L-leucyl-L-isoleucyl-L-leucyl-L-leucyl)

Identifiers
CAS Number	38184-76-8
3D model (JSmol)	Interactive image
ChemSpider	486785
PubChem CID	559969
- InChI: InChI=1S/C30H55N5O5/c1-11-19(9)24-29(39)32-21(13-16(3)4)26(36)31-22(14-17(5)6)27(37)34-25(20(10)12-2)30(40)33-23(15-18(7)8)28(38)35-24/h16-25H,11-15H2,1-10H3,(H,31,36)(H,32,39)(H,33,40)(H,34,37)(H,35,38) Key: KACXIDDXMHJUSH-UHFFFAOYSA-N
- SMILES: [C@@H](CC)(C)[C@]1(C(=O)N[C@@H](CC(C)C)C(=O)N[C@@]([C@H](CC)C)(C(=O)N[C@@H](CC(C)C)C(=O)N[C@@H](CC(C)C)C(=O)N1)[H])[H]

Properties
Chemical formula	C_{30}H_{55}N_{5}O_{5}
Molar mass	565.800 g·mol^{−1}
- Except where otherwise noted, data are given for materials in their standard state (at 25 °C [77 °F], 100 kPa). Infobox references

Viscumamide is a cyclic peptide isolated from endophytic fungi of mangrove.
