= Callipeltin =

Callipeltin A

Callipeltin B

Callipeltin A and B are depsipeptides isolated from marine invertebrates. Preliminary research shows that they may have antiviral activity.

== See also ==
- Papuamide
