= GPNMB =

Protein-coding gene in humans

Identifiers
- Aliases: GPNMB, HGFIN, NMB, glycoprotein nmb, PLCA3
- External IDs: OMIM: 604368; MGI: 1934765; GeneCards: GPNMB

Gene location (Human)
Chr.	Chromosome 7 (human)
Band	7p15.3	Start	23,235,967 bp
Band	7p15.3	End	23,275,108 bp

Gene location (Mouse)
Chr.	Chromosome 6 (mouse)
Band	6 B2.3|6 23.82 cM	Start	49,013,480 bp
Band	6 B2.3|6 23.82 cM	End	49,047,863 bp
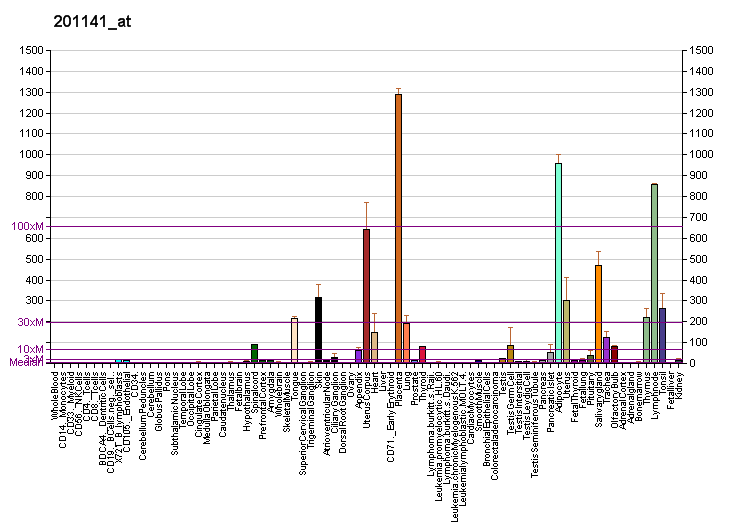
RNA expression pattern
Bgee	Human / Mouse (ortholog); Top expressed in: skin of thigh; skin of hip; tendon of biceps brachii; vulva; synovial joint; retinal pigment epithelium; skin of arm; skin of abdomen; nipple; gallbladder / Top expressed in: calvaria; stroma of bone marrow; gastrula; decidua; iris; ciliary body; hair follicle; stria vascularis; zygote; skin of external ear; More reference expression data
BioGPS	More reference expression data
Gene ontology
Molecular function	integrin binding; protein binding; heparin binding; chemoattractant activity; syndecan binding; receptor ligand activity
Cellular component	melanosome; membrane; plasma membrane; integral component of plasma membrane; integral component of membrane; cytoplasmic vesicle; endosome; early endosome membrane; melanosome membrane
Biological process	bone mineralization; negative regulation of tumor necrosis factor production; osteoblast differentiation; negative regulation of cell population proliferation; negative regulation of cytokine production; positive regulation of protein phosphorylation; signal transduction; cell-cell signaling; positive regulation of cell migration; positive regulation of protein autophosphorylation; regulation of tissue remodeling; negative regulation of T cell proliferation; regulation of angiogenesis; negative regulation of T cell activation; positive chemotaxis; positive regulation of ERK1 and ERK2 cascade; negative regulation of neuron death; negative regulation of G1/S transition of mitotic cell cycle; cell adhesion; regulation of signaling receptor activity
Sources:Amigo / QuickGO
Orthologs
Databases	NCBI: entry; OMA: entry
Species	Human	Mouse
Entrez	10457	93695
Ensembl	ENSG00000136235	ENSMUSG00000029816
UniProt	Q14956	Q99P91
RefSeq (mRNA)	NM_001005340; NM_002510	NM_053110
RefSeq (protein)	NP_001005340; NP_002501	NP_444340
Location (UCSC)	Chr 7: 23.24 – 23.28 Mb	Chr 6: 49.01 – 49.05 Mb
PubMed search
- Wikidata
View/Edit Human	View/Edit Mouse

Transmembrane glycoprotein NMB is a protein that in humans is encoded by the GPNMB gene. Two transcript variants encoding 560 and 572 amino acid isoforms have been characterized for this gene in humans. The mouse and rat orthologues of GPNMB are known as DC-HIL and Osteoactivin (OA), respectively.

GPNMB is a type I transmembrane glycoprotein which shows homology to the pmel17 precursor, a melanocyte-specific protein.

GPNMB has been reported to be expressed in various cell types, including: melanocytes, osteoclasts, osteoblasts, dendritic cells, and it is overexpressed in various cancer types. In melanocytic cells and osteoclasts the GPNMB gene is transcriptionally regulated by microphthalmia-associated transcription factor.

== Function ==
In osteoblast progenitor cells, Osteoactivin works as a positive regulator of osteoblast differentiation during later stages of matrix maturation and mineralization that is mediated at least in part by bone morphogenetic protein 2 in a SMAD1 dependent manner to promote osteoblast differentiation. In addition, using a rat fracture model, Osteoactivin (OA) enhances the repairing process in bone fracture, demonstrated by its high expression during chondrogenesis (soft callus) and osteogenesis (hard callus) compared to the intact femurs that is why Osteoactivin (OA) could be a novel therapeutic agent used to treat generalized osteoporosis or localized osteopenia during fracture repair by stimulating bone growth and regeneration. Similarly, Osteoactivin expression increases during osteoclast differentiation and it is functionally implicated in this process, possibly by promoting the fusion of osteoclast progenitor cells.

== Clinical and functional significance in cancer ==
GPNMB was originally identified as a gene that was expressed in poorly metastatic human melanoma cell lines and xenografts and not expressed in highly metastatic cell lines. However, several recent studies have identified high GPNMB expression in aggressive melanoma, glioma, and breast cancer specimens.

=== Breast cancer ===
Based on Immunohistochemical analysis, two studies have shown that GPNMB is commonly expressed in breast tumors. In the first study, GPNMB was detected in 71% (10/14) of breast tumors. In the second study, 64% of human breast tumors express GPNMB in the tumor stroma and an additional 10% of tumors express GPNMB in the tumor epithelium. In this study it was reported that GPNMB expression in the tumor epithelium was an independent prognostic indicator of breast cancer recurrence. Moreover, epithelial GPNMB expression was most abundant in triple negative breast cancers and it was found to be a prognostic marker for shorter metastasis-free survival times within this breast cancer subtype. Finally, GPNMB expression in breast cancer cells is capable of promoting cell migration, invasion, and metastasis both in vitro and in vivo.

== GPNMB as a target for therapy ==
GPNMB is the target of the antibody glembatumumab (CR011) which is used in the antibody-drug conjugate glembatumumab vedotin (CDX-011, CR011-vcMMAE) which is in clinical trials for melanoma and breast cancer. (See glembatumumab vedotin)
