= Biotechnology in pharmaceutical manufacturing =

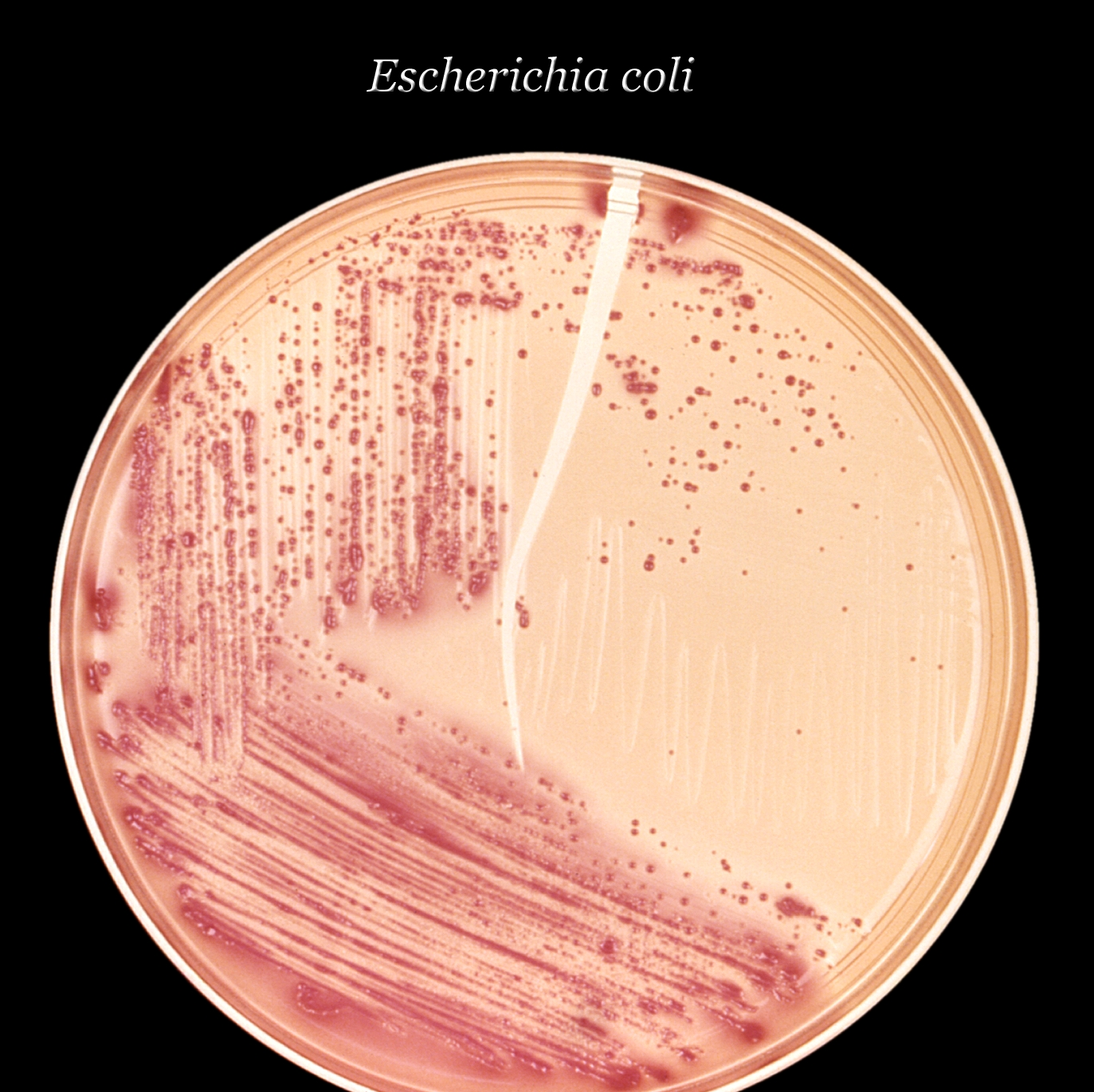
Escherichia coli bacteria, which are often utilized in production of pharmaceutical products.

Biotechnology in pharmaceutical manufacturing is the application of biological systems, living organisms, or their components to the development and production of pharmaceutical products. Biotechnology is often used in pharmaceutical manufacturing. Notable examples include the use of bacteria to produce things such as insulin or human growth hormone. Other examples include the use of transgenic pigs for the creation of hemoglobin in use of humans.

== Human Insulin ==
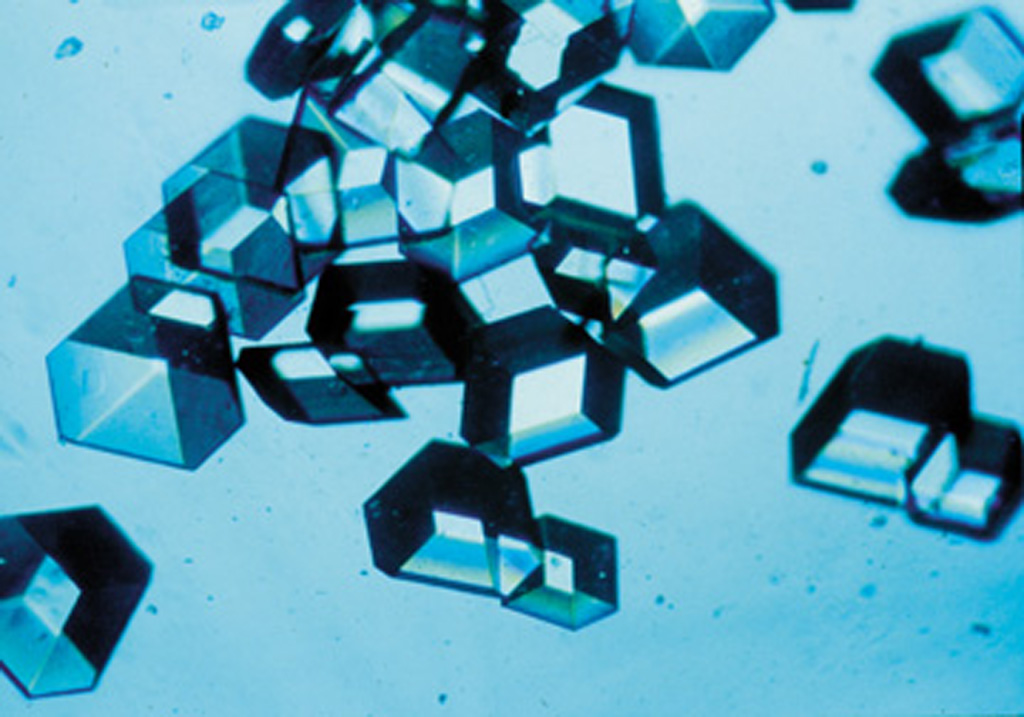
Insulin crystals

Amongst the earliest uses of biotechnology in pharmaceutical manufacturing is the use of recombinant DNA technology to modify Escherichia coli bacteria to produce human insulin, which was performed at Genentech in 1978. Prior to the development of this technique, insulin was extracted from the pancreas glands of cattle, pigs, and other farm animals. While generally efficacious in the treatment of diabetes, animal-derived insulin is not indistinguishable from human insulin, and may therefore produce allergic reactions. Genentech researchers produced artificial genes for each of the two protein chains that comprise the insulin molecule. The artificial genes were "then inserted... into plasmids... among a group of genes that" are activated by lactose. Thus, the insulin-producing genes were also activated by lactose. The recombinant plasmids were inserted into Escherichia coli bacteria, which were "induced to produce 100,000 molecules of either chain A or chain B human insulin." The two protein chains were then combined to produce insulin molecules.

== Human growth hormone ==
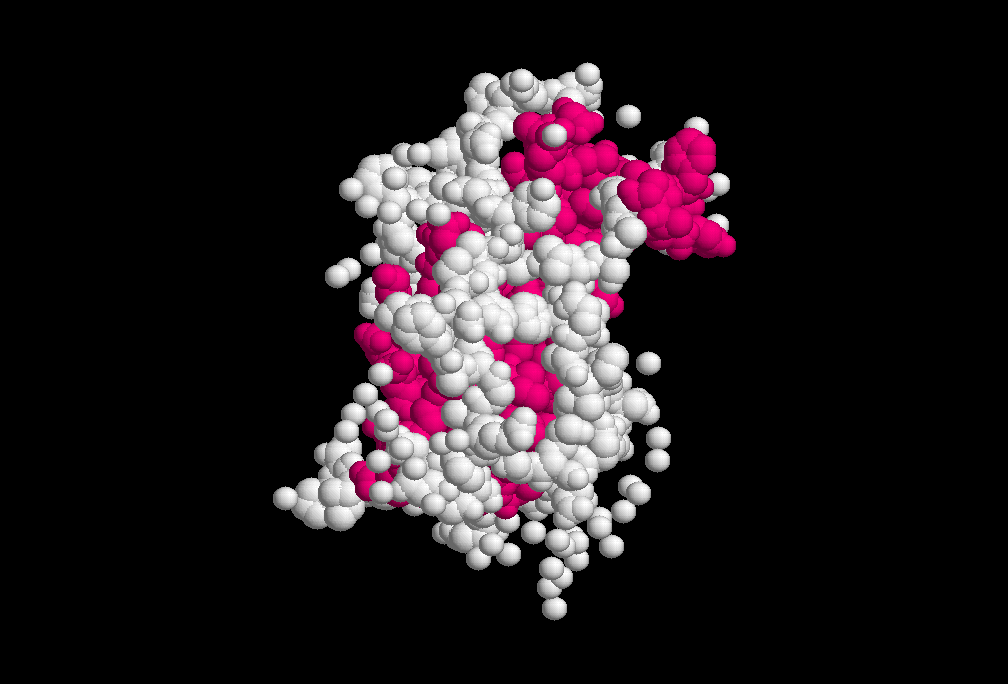
Growth hormone

Prior to the use of recombinant DNA technology to modify bacteria to produce human growth hormone, the hormone was manufactured by extraction from the pituitary glands of cadavers, as animal growth hormones have no therapeutic value in humans. Production of a single year's supply of human growth hormone required up to fifty pituitary glands, creating significant shortages of the hormone. In 1979, scientists at Genentech produced human growth hormone by inserting DNA coding for human growth hormone into a plasmid that was implanted in Escherichia coli bacteria. The gene that was inserted into the plasmid was created by reverse transcription of the mRNA found in pituitary glands to complementary DNA. HaeIII, a type of restriction enzyme which acts at restriction sites "in the 3' noncoding region" and at the 23rd codon in complementary DNA for human growth hormone, was used to produce "a DNA fragment of 551 base pairs which includes coding sequences for amino acids 24–191 of HGH." Then "a chemically synthesized DNA 'adaptor' fragment containing an ATG initiation codon..." was produced with the codons for the first through 23rd amino acids in human growth hormone. The "two DNA fragments... [were] combined to form a synthetic-natural 'hybrid' gene." The use of entirely synthetic methods of DNA production to produce a gene that would be translated to human growth hormone in Escherichia coli would have been exceedingly laborious due to the significant length of the amino acid sequence in human growth hormone. However, if the cDNA reverse transcribed from the mRNA for human growth hormone were inserted directly into the plasmid inserted into the Escherichia coli, the bacteria would translate regions of the gene that are not translated in humans, thereby producing a "pre-hormone containing an extra 26 amino acids" which might be difficult to remove.

== Human blood clotting factors ==
Prior to the development and FDA approval of a means to produce human blood clotting factors using recombinant DNA technologies, human blood clotting factors were produced from donated blood that was inadequately screened for HIV. Thus, HIV infection posed a significant danger to patients with hemophilia who received human blood clotting factors:

Most reports indicate that 60 to 80 percent of patients with hemophilia who were exposed to factor VIII concentrates between 1979 and 1984 are seropositive for HIV by [the] Western blot assay. As of May 1988, more than 659 patients with hemophilia had AIDS...

The first human blood clotting factor to be produced in significant quantities using recombinant DNA technology was Factor IX, which was produced using transgenic Chinese hamster ovary cells in 1986. Lacking a map of the human genome, researchers obtained a known sequence of the RNA for Factor IX by examining the amino acids in Factor IX:

Microsequencing of highly purified... [Factor IX] yielded sufficient amino acid sequence to construct oligonucleotide probes.

The known sequence of Factor IX RNA was then used to search for the gene coding for Factor IX in a library of the DNA found in the human liver, since it was known that blood clotting factors are produced by the human liver:

A unique oligonucleotide... homologous to Factor IX mRNA... was synthesized and labeled... The resultant probe was used to screen a human liver double-stranded cDNA library... Complete two-stranded DNA sequences of the... [relevant] cDNA... contained all of the coding sequence COOH-terminal of the eleventh codon (11) and the entire 3'-untranslated sequence.

This sequence of cDNA was used to find the remaining DNA sequences comprising the Factor IX gene by searching the DNA in the X chromosome:

A genomic library from a human XXXX chromosome was prepared... and screen[ed] with a Factor IX cDNA probe. Hybridizing recombinant phage were isolated, plaque-purified, and the DNA isolated. Restriction mapping, Southern analysis, and DNA sequencing permitted identification of five recombinant phage-containing inserts which, when overlapped at common sequences, coded the entire 35kb Factor IX gene.

Plasmids containing the Factor IX gene, along with plasmids with a gene that codes for resistance to methotrexate, were inserted into Chinese hamster ovary cells via transfection. Transfection involves the insertion of DNA into a eukaryotic cell. Unlike the analogous process of transformation in bacteria, transfected DNA is not ordinarily integrated into the cell's genome, and is therefore not usually passed on to subsequent generations via cell division. Thus, in order to obtain a "stable" transfection, a gene which confers a significant survival advantage must also be transfected, causing the few cells that did integrate the transfected DNA into their genomes to increase their population as cells that did not integrate the DNA are eliminated. In the case of this study, "grow[th] in increasing concentrations of methotrexate" promoted the survival of stably transfected cells, and diminished the survival of other cells.

The Chinese hamster ovary cells that were stably transfected produced significant quantities of Factor IX, which was shown to have substantial coagulant properties, though of a lesser degree than Factor IX produced from human blood:

The specific activity of the recombinant Factor IX was measured on the basis of direct measurement of the coagulant activity... The specific activity of recombinant Factor IX was 75 units/mg... compared to 150 units/mg measured for plasma-derived Factor IX...

In 1992, the FDA approved Factor VIII produced using transgenic Chinese hamster ovary cells, the first such blood clotting factor produced using recombinant DNA technology to be approved.

== Transgenic farm animals ==
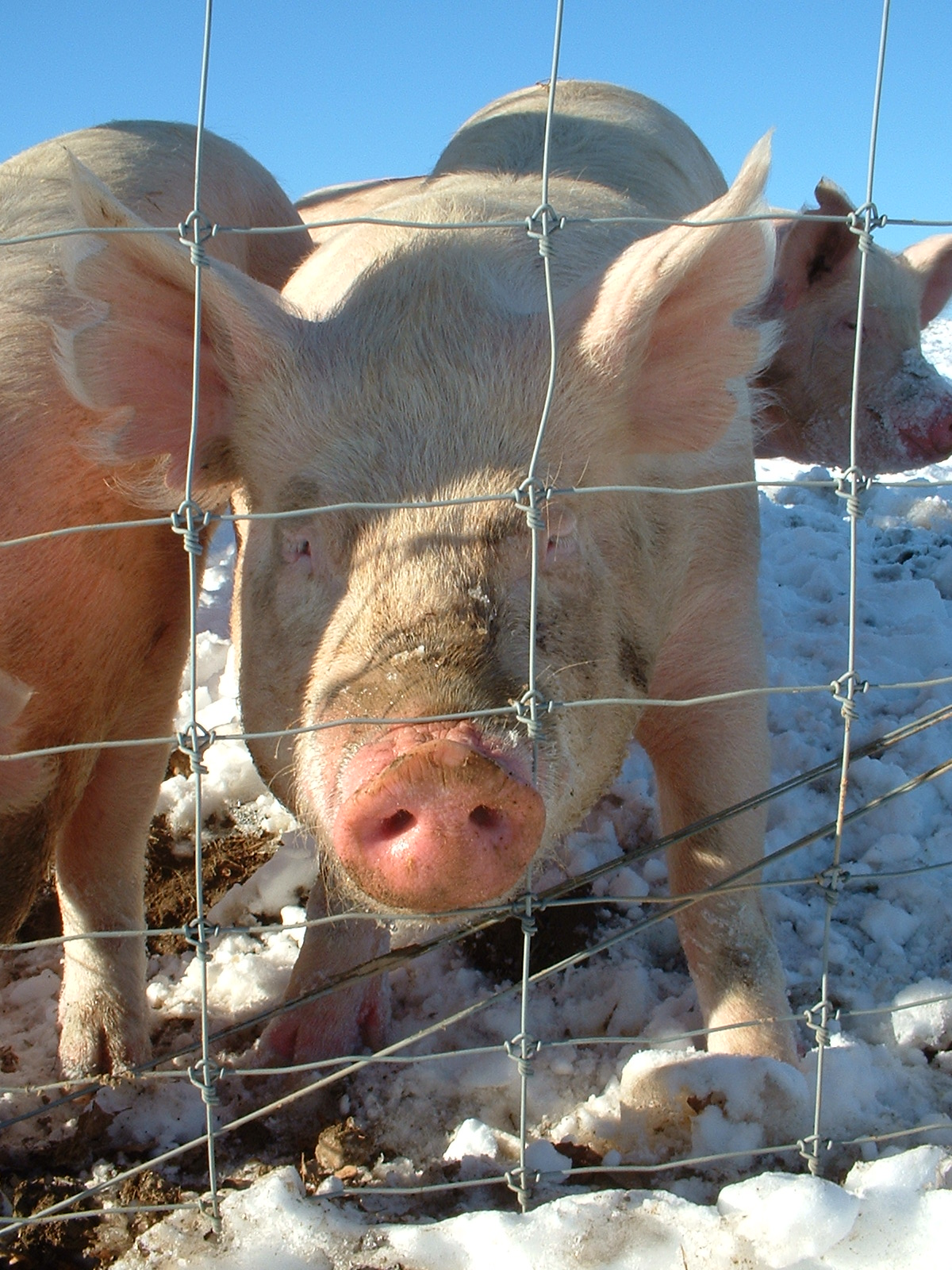
A pig, transgenic generations of which might be used to produce blood substitutes for use in humans.

Recombinant DNA techniques have also been employed to create transgenic farm animals that can produce pharmaceutical products for use in humans. For instance, pigs that produce human hemoglobin have been created. While blood from such pigs could not be employed directly for transfusion to humans, the hemoglobin could be refined and employed to manufacture a blood substitute.

== Paclitaxel (Taxol) ==
Bristol-Myers Squibb manufactures paclitaxel using Penicillium raistrickii and plant cell fermentation (PCF).

== Artemisinin ==
Transgenic yeast are used to produce artemisinin, as well as a number of insulin analogs.

== See also ==
- Molecular Biotechnology (journal)
- Bacillus isolates
- Fungal isolates
- Medicinal molds
- Sponge isolates
- Streptomyces isolates
