= Aplyzanzine A =

Identifiers
CAS Number	327165-67-3
3D model (JSmol)	Interactive image
ChEMBL	ChEMBL2062974
ChemSpider	28522664
PubChem CID	60153165
CompTox Dashboard (EPA)	DTXSID601336058
- InChI: InChI=1S/C25H33Br4N3O3/c1-31(2)9-6-10-35-24-20(28)11-16(12-21(24)29)7-8-30-25(33)22(32(3)4)15-17-13-18(26)23(34-5)19(27)14-17/h11-14,22H,6-10,15H2,1-5H3,(H,30,33)/t22-/m0/s1 Key: OZOVQXJIZUQCKN-QFIPXVFZSA-N
- SMILES: CN(C)CCCOc1c(cc(cc1Br)CCNC(=O)[C@H](Cc2cc(c(c(c2)Br)OC)Br)N(C)C)Br
- Except where otherwise noted, data are given for materials in their standard state (at 25 °C [77 °F], 100 kPa). Infobox references

Aplyzanzine A is a bio-active isolate of marine sponge.
