= Halicylindramide =

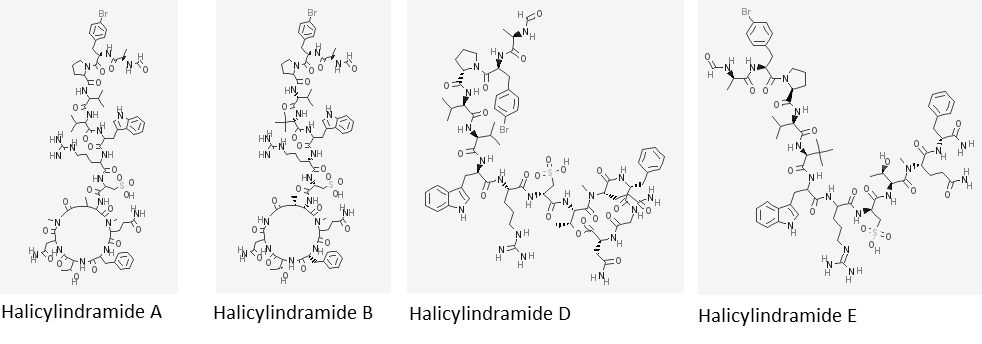
- Halicylindramides A, B, D, and E

Identifiers
CAS Number	D: 172548-80-0
3D model (JSmol)	B: Interactive image; C: Interactive image; D: Interactive image; E: Interactive image
ChEMBL	B: ChEMBL2370488; C: ChEMBL2370489; D: ChEMBL1208206; E: ChEMBL448811
ChemSpider	B: 30809069; C: 30809070; D: 17288031; E: 24686879
PubChem CID	B: 73351577; C: 73354568; D: 16131321; E: 44584234
- InChI: B: InChI=1S/C79H111BrN20O21S/c1-40(2)61(95-72(113)58-22-16-30-100(58)76(117)55(93-65(106)42(4)88-39-101)33-45-23-25-47(80)26-24-45)73(114)98-64(79(6,7)8)75(116)92-53(34-46-36-86-50-20-14-13-19-49(46)50)68(109)89-51(21-15-29-85-78(83)84)67(108)94-56(38-122(119,120)121)70(111)96-62-41(3)31-48(103)37-87-66(107)54(35-60(82)105)91-74(115)63(43(5)102)97-69(110)52(32-44-17-11-10-12-18-44)90-71(112)57(27-28-59(81)104)99(9)77(62)118/h10-14,17-20,23-26,36,39-43,51-58,61-64,86,102H,15-16,21-22,27-35,37-38H2,1-9H3,(H2,81,104)(H2,82,105)(H,87,107)(H,88,101)(H,89,109)(H,90,112)(H,91,115)(H,92,116)(H,93,106)(H,94,108)(H,95,113)(H,96,111)(H,97,110)(H,98,114)(H4,83,84,85)(H,119,120,121)/t41-,42+,43+,51-,52+,53-,54-,55-,56+,57-,58-,61+,62-,63-,64+/m0/s1 Key: BAVRERVRSYQBOR-UNOCJTLJSA-N; C: InChI=1S/C80H113BrN20O21S/c1-41(2)62(95-72(113)59-23-17-31-101(59)77(118)55(92-66(107)43(4)88-40-102)34-46-24-26-48(81)27-25-46)73(114)98-65(80(6,7)8)75(116)91-54(35-47-37-87-51-21-15-14-20-50(47)51)68(109)89-52(22-16-30-86-79(84)85)67(108)94-57(39-123(120,121)122)70(111)96-63-42(3)32-49(104)38-99(9)76(117)56(36-61(83)106)93-74(115)64(44(5)103)97-69(110)53(33-45-18-12-11-13-19-45)90-71(112)58(28-29-60(82)105)100(10)78(63)119/h11-15,18-21,24-27,37,40-44,52-59,62-65,87,103H,16-17,22-23,28-36,38-39H2,1-10H3,(H2,82,105)(H2,83,106)(H,88,102)(H,89,109)(H,90,112)(H,91,116)(H,92,107)(H,93,115)(H,94,108)(H,95,113)(H,96,111)(H,97,110)(H,98,114)(H4,84,85,86)(H,120,121,122)/t42-,43+,44+,52-,53+,54-,55-,56-,57+,58-,59-,62+,63-,64-,65+/m0/s1 Key: WKSKQLSTZWRXQA-FZNZYQBJSA-N; D: InChI=1S/C73H100BrN19O20S/c1-37(2)58(90-69(106)59(38(3)4)89-67(104)54-20-14-28-93(54)70(107)50(87-61(98)39(5)82-36-94)30-42-21-23-44(74)24-22-42)68(105)86-49(31-43-33-80-46-18-12-11-17-45(43)46)64(101)84-47(19-13-27-79-73(77)78)63(100)88-52(35-114(110,111)112)65(102)91-60-40(6)113-72(109)51(32-56(76)96)83-57(97)34-81-62(99)48(29-41-15-9-8-10-16-41)85-66(103)53(25-26-55(75)95)92(7)71(60)108/h8-12,15-18,21-24,33,36-40,47-54,58-60,80H,13-14,19-20,25-32,34-35H2,1-7H3,(H2,75,95)(H2,76,96)(H,81,99)(H,82,94)(H,83,97)(H,84,101)(H,85,103)(H,86,105)(H,87,98)(H,88,100)(H,89,104)(H,90,106)(H,91,102)(H4,77,78,79)(H,110,111,112)/t39-,40-,47+,48-,49-,50+,51-,52-,53+,54+,58+,59-,60+/m1/s1 Key: LCUFSEOEZNOMTE-HUKYMJEXSA-N; E: InChI=1S/C68H96BrN17O17S.Na/c1-36(2)53(82-62(96)51-21-15-29-86(51)65(99)48(80-57(91)37(3)76-35-87)31-40-22-24-42(69)25-23-40)63(97)84-55(68(5,6)7)64(98)79-47(32-41-33-75-44-19-13-12-18-43(41)44)59(93)77-45(20-14-28-74-67(72)73)58(92)81-49(34-104(101,102)103)60(94)83-54(38(4)88)66(100)85(8)50(26-27-52(70)89)61(95)78-46(56(71)90)30-39-16-10-9-11-17-39;/h9-13,16-19,22-25,33,35-38,45-51,53-55,75,88H,14-15,20-21,26-32,34H2,1-8H3,(H2,70,89)(H2,71,90)(H,76,87)(H,77,93)(H,78,95)(H,79,98)(H,80,91)(H,81,92)(H,82,96)(H,83,94)(H,84,97)(H4,72,73,74)(H,101,102,103);/q;+1/p-1/t37-,38-,45+,46-,47-,48+,49-,50+,51+,53-,54+,55-;/m1./s1 Key: XGLTWRNTKVWUQL-LNBFUSFRSA-M
- SMILES: B: C[C@H]1CC(=O)CNC(=O)[C@@H](NC(=O)[C@@H](NC(=O)[C@H](NC(=O)[C@@H](N(C(=O)[C@H]1NC(=O)[C@@H](CS(=O)(=O)O)NC(=O)[C@H](CCCNC(=N)N)NC(=O)[C@H](CC2=CNC3=CC=CC=C32)NC(=O)[C@H](C(C)(C)C)NC(=O)[C@@H](C(C)C)NC(=O)[C@@H]4CCCN4C(=O)[C@H](CC5=CC=C(C=C5)Br)NC(=O)[C@@H](C)NC=O)C)CCC(=O)N)CC6=CC=CC=C6)[C@@H](C)O)CC(=O)N; C: C[C@H]1CC(=O)CN(C(=O)[C@@H](NC(=O)[C@@H](NC(=O)[C@H](NC(=O)[C@@H](N(C(=O)[C@H]1NC(=O)[C@@H](CS(=O)(=O)O)NC(=O)[C@H](CCCNC(=N)N)NC(=O)[C@H](CC2=CNC3=CC=CC=C32)NC(=O)[C@H](C(C)(C)C)NC(=O)[C@@H](C(C)C)NC(=O)[C@@H]4CCCN4C(=O)[C@H](CC5=CC=C(C=C5)Br)NC(=O)[C@@H](C)NC=O)C)CCC(=O)N)CC6=CC=CC=C6)[C@@H](C)O)CC(=O)N)C; D: C[C@@H]1[C@@H](C(=O)N([C@H](C(=O)N[C@@H](C(=O)NCC(=O)N[C@@H](C(=O)O1)CC(=O)N)CC2=CC=CC=C2)CCC(=O)N)C)NC(=O)[C@@H](CS(=O)(=O)O)NC(=O)[C@H](CCCNC(=N)N)NC(=O)[C@@H](CC3=CNC4=CC=CC=C43)NC(=O)[C@H](C(C)C)NC(=O)[C@@H](C(C)C)NC(=O)[C@@H]5CCCN5C(=O)[C@H](CC6=CC=C(C=C6)Br)NC(=O)[C@@H](C)NC=O; E: C[C@H]([C@@H](C(=O)N(C)[C@@H](CCC(=O)N)C(=O)N[C@H](CC1=CC=CC=C1)C(=O)N)NC(=O)[C@@H](CS(=O)(=O)[O-])NC(=O)[C@H](CCCN=C(N)N)NC(=O)[C@@H](CC2=CNC3=CC=CC=C32)NC(=O)[C@H](C(C)(C)C)NC(=O)[C@@H](C(C)C)NC(=O)[C@@H]4CCCN4C(=O)[C@H](CC5=CC=C(C=C5)Br)NC(=O)[C@@H](C)NC=O)O.[Na+]
- Except where otherwise noted, data are given for materials in their standard state (at 25 °C [77 °F], 100 kPa). Infobox references

Halicylindramides are a group of halogenated antifungal peptides. The first compounds of this type, designated halicylindramides A through E, were isolated from sea sponges of the genus Halichondria. More compounds in the family, designated F, G and H, were found in sponges of the genus Petrosia. Halicylindramide A has been synthesized by chemists.
