= Polydiscamide B =

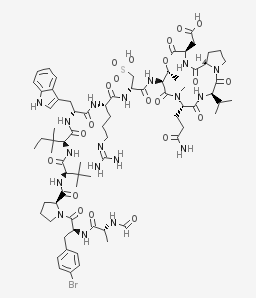

Names
- IUPAC name 2-[(3R,6S,9S,10R,13R,16S)-6-(3-amino-3-oxopropyl)-9-[[(2S)-2-[[(2S)-2-[[(2R)-2-[[(2S)-2-[[(2R)-2-[[(2S)-1-[(2S)-3-(4-bromophenyl)-2-[[(2R)-2-formamidopropanoyl]amino]propanoyl]pyrrolidine-2-carbonyl]amino]-3,3-dimethylbutanoyl]amino]-3,3-dimethylpentanoyl]amino]-3-(1H-indol-3-yl)propanoyl]amino]-5-(diaminomethylideneamino)pentanoyl]amino]-3-sulfopropanoyl]amino]-7,10-dimethyl-2,5,8,12,15-pentaoxo-3-propan-2-yl-11-oxa-1,4,7,14-tetrazabicyclo[14.3.0]nonadecan-13-yl]acetic acid

Identifiers
| 3D model (JSmol) | Interactive image |
| ChEMBL | ChEMBL403900 |
| ChemSpider | 23314597 |
| PubChem CID | 25077700 |
- InChI: InChI=1S/C75H109BrN18O21S/c1-12-75(9,10)59(91-67(106)58(74(6,7)8)90-66(105)53-22-16-30-93(53)69(108)48(85-60(99)39(4)82-37-95)32-41-23-25-43(76)26-24-41)68(107)84-47(33-42-35-81-45-19-14-13-18-44(42)45)62(101)83-46(20-15-29-80-73(78)79)61(100)87-50(36-116(112,113)114)63(102)89-57-40(5)115-72(111)49(34-55(97)98)86-65(104)52-21-17-31-94(52)71(110)56(38(2)3)88-64(103)51(27-28-54(77)96)92(11)70(57)109/h13-14,18-19,23-26,35,37-40,46-53,56-59,81H,12,15-17,20-22,27-34,36H2,1-11H3,(H2,77,96)(H,82,95)(H,83,101)(H,84,107)(H,85,99)(H,86,104)(H,87,100)(H,88,103)(H,89,102)(H,90,105)(H,91,106)(H,97,98)(H4,78,79,80)(H,112,113,114)/t39-,40-,46+,47-,48+,49-,50-,51+,52+,53+,56-,57+,58+,59-/m1/s1 Key: SVMYZZWGWZMWMH-SRZFOLISSA-N
- SMILES: CCC(C)(C)[C@@H](C(=O)N[C@H](CC1=CNC2=CC=CC=C21)C(=O)N[C@@H](CCCN=C(N)N)C(=O)N[C@H](CS(=O)(=O)O)C(=O)N[C@H]3[C@H](OC(=O)[C@H](NC(=O)[C@@H]4CCCN4C(=O)[C@H](NC(=O)[C@@H](N(C3=O)C)CCC(=O)N)C(C)C)CC(=O)O)C)NC(=O)[C@@H](C(C)(C)C)NC(=O)[C@@H]5CCCN5C(=O)[C@H](CC6=CC=C(C=C6)Br)NC(=O)[C@@H](C)NC=O
- Except where otherwise noted, data are given for materials in their standard state (at 25 °C [77 °F], 100 kPa). Infobox references

Polydiscamide B, and related compounds, are sea sponge isolates and human sensory neuron-specific G protein coupled receptor agonists.
