= Plakevulin A =

Names
- Preferred IUPAC name Methyl (1R,2S,5S)-2-hexadecyl-2,5-dihydroxycyclopent-3-ene-1-carboxylate

Identifiers
CAS Number	518035-27-3
3D model (JSmol)	Interactive image
ChEMBL	ChEMBL210842
ChemSpider	8560701
PubChem CID	10385259
CompTox Dashboard (EPA)	DTXSID101045466
- InChI: InChI=1S/C23H42O4/c1-3-4-5-6-7-8-9-10-11-12-13-14-15-16-18-23(26)19-17-20(24)21(23)22(25)27-2/h17,19-21,24,26H,3-16,18H2,1-2H3/t20-,21-,23-/m0/s1 Key: SOLXJOFQECGRPS-FUDKSRODSA-N
- SMILES: CCCCCCCCCCCCCCCC[C@@]1(C=C[C@@H]([C@H]1C(=O)OC)O)O

Properties
Chemical formula	C_{23}H_{42}O_{4}
Molar mass	382.585 g·mol^{−1}
- Except where otherwise noted, data are given for materials in their standard state (at 25 °C [77 °F], 100 kPa). Infobox references

Plakevulin A is a bio-active metabolite of the sea sponge Plakortis.
