= Hyrtinadine A =

Names
- Preferred IUPAC name 3,3′-(Pyrimidine-2,5-diyl)di(1H-indol-5-ol)

Identifiers
CAS Number	925253-33-4
3D model (JSmol)	Interactive image
ChEMBL	ChEMBL426727
ChemSpider	17214309
PubChem CID	16115665
UNII	U4UQ8DYY65
CompTox Dashboard (EPA)	DTXSID70583032
- InChI: InChI=1S/C20H14N4O2/c25-12-1-3-18-14(5-12)16(9-21-18)11-7-23-20(24-8-11)17-10-22-19-4-2-13(26)6-15(17)19/h1-10,21-22,25-26H Key: BCHVDGBLKXHBKK-UHFFFAOYSA-N; InChI=1/C20H14N4O2/c25-12-1-3-18-14(5-12)16(9-21-18)11-7-23-20(24-8-11)17-10-22-19-4-2-13(26)6-15(17)19/h1-10,21-22,25-26H Key: BCHVDGBLKXHBKK-UHFFFAOYAU
- SMILES: Oc5ccc4[nH]cc(C3C=NC(c1c[nH]c2ccc(O)cc12)N=C3)c4c5

Properties
Chemical formula	C_{20}H_{14}N_{4}O_{2}
Molar mass	342.358 g·mol^{−1}
- Except where otherwise noted, data are given for materials in their standard state (at 25 °C [77 °F], 100 kPa). Infobox references

Hyrtinadine A is a chemical compound which is found in a marine sponge.
