= Hymenistatin =

Names
- IUPAC name cyclo[L-isoleucyl-L-isoleucyl-L-prolyl-L-prolyl-L-tyrosyl-L-valyl-L-prolyl-L-leucyl]
- Other names HS-1

Identifiers
CAS Number	129536-23-8
3D model (JSmol)	Interactive image
ChEMBL	ChEMBL2370330
ChemSpider	8277738
PubChem CID	10102206
- InChI: InChI=1S/C47H72N8O9/c1-9-28(7)38-44(61)52-39(29(8)10-2)47(64)55-23-13-16-36(55)45(62)53-21-11-14-34(53)42(59)49-33(25-30-17-19-31(56)20-18-30)41(58)50-37(27(5)6)46(63)54-22-12-15-35(54)43(60)48-32(24-26(3)4)40(57)51-38/h17-20,26-29,32-39,56H,9-16,21-25H2,1-8H3,(H,48,60)(H,49,59)(H,50,58)(H,51,57)(H,52,61)/t28-,29-,32-,33-,34-,35-,36-,37-,38-,39-/m0/s1 Key: NACGNHONDBBQGE-MXKYYYADSA-N
- SMILES: CC[C@H](C)[C@H]1C(=O)N[C@H](C(=O)N2CCC[C@H]2C(=O)N3CCC[C@H]3C(=O)N[C@H](C(=O)N[C@H](C(=O)N4CCC[C@H]4C(=O)N[C@H](C(=O)N1)CC(C)C)C(C)C)Cc5ccc(cc5)O)[C@@H](C)CC

Properties
Chemical formula	C_{47}H_{72}N_{8}O_{9}
Molar mass	893.140 g·mol^{−1}
- Except where otherwise noted, data are given for materials in their standard state (at 25 °C [77 °F], 100 kPa). Infobox references

Hymenistatin is a cyclic peptide of eight amino acids in size first isolated from the sea sponge Phakellia fusca. The amino acid sequence of this substance is cyclo[Ile-Ile-Pro-Pro-Tyr-Val-Pro-Leu].
