= Gamma-D-Glutamyl-meso-diaminopimelate peptidase =

Gamma-D-glutamyl-meso-diaminopimelate peptidase

Identifiers
- EC no.: 3.4.19.11
- CAS no.: 62572-28-5

Databases
- IntEnz: IntEnz view
- BRENDA: BRENDA entry
- ExPASy: NiceZyme view
- KEGG: KEGG entry
- MetaCyc: metabolic pathway
- PRIAM: profile
- PDB structures: RCSB PDB PDBe PDBsum
Search
- PMC: articles
- PubMed: articles
- NCBI: proteins

Gamma-D-glutamyl-meso-diaminopimelate peptidase (EC 3.4.19.11, endopeptidase I, gamma-D-glutamyldiaminopimelate endopeptidase, gamma-D-glutamyl-L-meso-diaminopimelate peptidoglycan hydrolase, gamma-glutamyl-L-meso-diaminopimelyl endopeptidase, gamma-D-glutamyl-meso-diaminopimelate endopeptidase, gamma-D-glutamyl-meso-diaminopimelic peptidoglycan hydrolase, gamma-D-glutamyl-meso-diaminopimelic endopeptidase, gamma-D-glutamyl-meso-D-aminopimelic endopeptidase) is an enzyme. This enzyme catalyses the following chemical reaction

Hydrolysis of gamma-D-glutamyl bonds to the L-terminus (position 7) of meso-diaminopimelic acid (meso-A2pm) in 7-(L-Ala-gamma-D-Glu)-meso-A2pm and 7-(L-Ala-gamma-D-Glu)-7-(D-Ala)-meso-A2pm. It is required that the D-terminal amino and carboxy groups of meso-A2pm are unsubstituted

This metallopeptidase is isolate from Bacillus sphaericus.
