= Avarol =

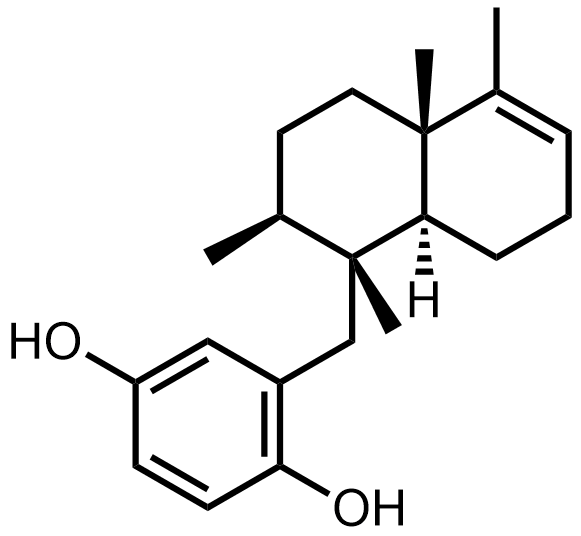

Names
- Preferred IUPAC name (1R,2S,4aS,8aS)-1,2,4a,5-tetramethyl-2,3,4,7,8,8a-hexahydronaphthalen-1-yl]methyl]benzene-1,4-diol

Identifiers
| CAS Number | 55303-98-5 |
| 3D model (JSmol) | Interactive image |
| ChEMBL | ChEMBL459814 |
| ChemSpider | 65156 |
| ECHA InfoCard | 100.117.944 |
| EC Number | 611-252-1 |
| PubChem CID | 72185 |
| UNII | KZX416VN2B |
| CompTox Dashboard (EPA) | DTXSID80203850 |
- InChI: InChI=1S/C21H30O2/c1-14-6-5-7-19-20(14,3)11-10-15(2)21(19,4)13-16-12-17(22)8-9-18(16)23/h6,8-9,12,15,19,22-23H,5,7,10-11,13H2,1-4H3/t15-,19+,20+,21+/m0/s1 Key: JSPUCPNQXKTYRO-LWILDLIXSA-N
- SMILES: C[C@H]1CC[C@]2([C@H]([C@]1(C)CC3=C(C=CC(=C3)O)O)CCC=C2C)C

Properties
| Chemical formula | C_{21}H_{30}O_{2} |
| Molar mass | 314.22458 g/mol |
- Except where otherwise noted, data are given for materials in their standard state (at 25 °C [77 °F], 100 kPa). verify (what is ?) Infobox references

Avarol is a hydroquinone first isolated from the Mediterranean marine sponge Dysidea avara 1974 Avarol represented the first sesquiterpenoid with a rearranged drimane skeleton and its structure was established by standard analytical methods, chemical degradation and later by stereocontrolled synthesis. Intrigued by the wide range of biological activities of this metabolite, Avarol has inspired the development of many synthetic derivatives and the study of their applications.

== Biological activity ==
Avarol has exhibited a wide range of biological activities, including: antitumor, antimicrobial, antiviral, etc. Proven both in vitro and in vivo, at a concentration of 3.5 μg/mL, avarol inhibited at 71% glioblastoma cancer cell growth of cells derived from a patient with primary and metastatic malignant glioblastoma tumour. It was reported that avarol can penetrate the blood–brain barrier while showing a low neurotoxicity on rat brain synaptosomes. Colon HT-29 tumour cells were also sensitive towards this organic compound (IC50 < 7 mM). so further studies on avarol scaffolds may contribute to development of new drug-like molecules targeting human colon tumour.

Antibacterial activity of avarol on four selected pathogenic bacteria associated with psoriasis exhibited moderate activity where minimum inhibitory and minimum bactericidal concentrations ranged from 0.78-1.56 and 3.12-18.75 μg/mL, respectively. It also proved to be more effective against Bacillus cereus in comparison to both positive controls applied, gentamicin and ampicillin.

It was found to inhibit various activities of the human immunodeficiency virus (HIV). Avarol completely blocks the synthesis of glutamine transfer tRNA, which is crucial for synthesis of a viral protease required for the virus’ proliferation. This compound also inhibits other important biological targets including the virus’ reverse transcriptase and the inhibition of cyclooxygenase and 5′-lipoxygenase. Avarol’s potent activity, low toxicity and its ability to cross the blood-brain barrier makes this compound an optimum candidate for structural transformations aimed at improving its antiviral activity.

== Biosynthesis ==
Terpenoid hydrocarbons, like the ones seen in Avarol's structure, are biosynthesised by the coupling of isoprene units in the form of isopentenyl pyrophosphate (IPP) to give polyenyl pyrophosphates. These are then transformed to the terpenes by terpene synthases. Coupling of two IPP molecules gives geranyl pyrophosphate (GPP) which is the precursor to all monoterpenes and the addition of another isoprene unit to gives farnesyl pyrophosphate (FPP), from which all sesquiterpenes are derived. The cyclization of farnesyl pyrophosphate (FPP) takes place by an initial electrophilic attack at the head position of FPP giving rise to a concerted process leading to a bicyclic carbocationic intermediate from which the final products, drimane or 4,9-friedodrimane structural types are formed

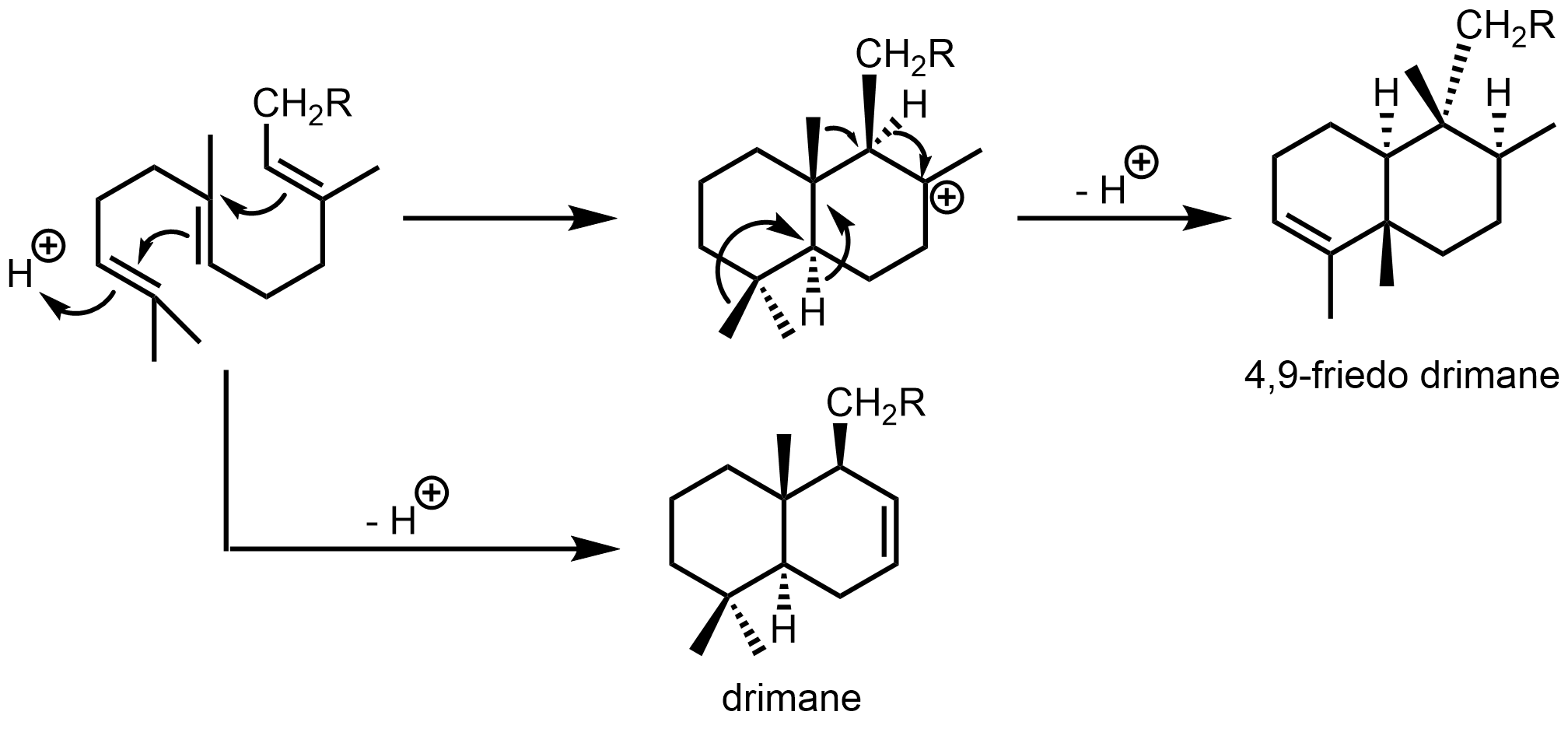
