= Suberedamine =

- Suberedamine A

- Suberedamine B

Identifiers
| CAS Number | A: 352197-11-6; B: 352197-39-8 |
| 3D model (JSmol) | A: Interactive image; B: Interactive image |
| ChEMBL | A: ChEMBL464660; B: ChEMBL465833 |
| ChemSpider | A: 8659624; B: 8434200 |
| PubChem CID | A: 10484217; B: 10258717 |
- InChI: A: InChI=1S/C23H30Br3N3O3/c1-29(2)9-4-10-32-22-18(25)12-16(13-19(22)26)7-8-28-23(30)20(27)14-15-5-6-21(31-3)17(24)11-15/h5-6,11-13,20H,4,7-10,14,27H2,1-3H3,(H,28,30)/t20-/m0/s1 Key: CPOMDHYOIBOZBW-FQEVSTJZSA-N; B: InChI=1S/C24H32Br3N3O3/c1-28-21(15-16-6-7-22(32-4)18(25)12-16)24(31)29-9-8-17-13-19(26)23(20(27)14-17)33-11-5-10-30(2)3/h6-7,12-14,21,28H,5,8-11,15H2,1-4H3,(H,29,31)/t21-/m0/s1 Key: MNNHZXNEKPRDII-NRFANRHFSA-N
- SMILES: A: CN(C)CCCOC1=C(C=C(C=C1Br)CCNC(=O)[C@H](CC2=CC(=C(C=C2)OC)Br)N)Br; B: CN[C@@H](CC1=CC(=C(C=C1)OC)Br)C(=O)NCCC2=CC(=C(C(=C2)Br)OCCCN(C)C)Br
- Except where otherwise noted, data are given for materials in their standard state (at 25 °C [77 °F], 100 kPa). Infobox references

Suberedamines are chemical compounds that have been isolated from marine sponges in the genus Suberea. The compounds are brominated tyrosine dimer derivatives.

== Extra reading ==
- Tsuda, Masashi; Sakuma, Yusuke; Kobayashi, Jun'ichi (July 2001). "Suberedamines A and B, New Bromotyrosine Alkaloids from a Sponge Suberea Species". Journal of Natural Products. 64 (7): 980–982. Bibcode:2001JNAtP..64..980T. doi:10.1021/np010077g. PMID 11473442.
- Xiong, Fong. "Total Synthesis of Suberedamine a". acs.confex.com.
- Cordell, Geoffrey A. (23 August 2005). The Alkaloids: Chemistry and Biology. Gulf Professional Publishing. p. 86. ISBN 978-0-12-469561-0.
