= Agosterol A =

Names
- IUPAC name (22R)-11α,22-Dihydroxy-5α-cholest-7-ene-3β,4β,6α-triyl triacetate
- Systematic IUPAC name (1R,3aR,5S,5aS,6R,7S,9aR,9bR,10R,11aR)-10-Hydroxy-1-[(2S,3R)-3-hydroxy-6-methylheptan-2-yl]-9a,11a-dimethyl-2,3,3a,5,5a,6,7,8,9,9a,9b,10,11,11a-tetradecahydro-1H-cyclopenta[a]phenanthrene-5,6,7-triyl triacetate

Identifiers
CAS Number	213549-32-7
3D model (JSmol)	Interactive image
ChemSpider	8523614
PubChem CID	10348156
UNII	YTC6258TAR
CompTox Dashboard (EPA)	DTXSID701045583
- InChI: InChI=1S/C33H52O8/c1-17(2)9-12-25(37)18(3)23-10-11-24-22-15-28(40-20(5)35)30-31(41-21(6)36)27(39-19(4)34)13-14-32(30,7)29(22)26(38)16-33(23,24)8/h15,17-18,23-31,37-38H,9-14,16H2,1-8H3/t18-,23+,24-,25+,26+,27-,28-,29+,30-,31-,32+,33+/m0/s1 Key: SUIRSZOPEPPNGJ-JGEDILIOSA-N; InChI=1/C33H52O8/c1-17(2)9-12-25(37)18(3)23-10-11-24-22-15-28(40-20(5)35)30-31(41-21(6)36)27(39-19(4)34)13-14-32(30,7)29(22)26(38)16-33(23,24)8/h15,17-18,23-31,37-38H,9-14,16H2,1-8H3/t18-,23+,24-,25+,26+,27-,28-,29+,30-,31-,32+,33+/m0/s1 Key: SUIRSZOPEPPNGJ-JGEDILIOBG
- SMILES: C[C@@H]([C@H]1CC[C@@H]2[C@@]1(C[C@H]([C@H]3C2=C[C@@H]([C@@H]4[C@@]3(CC[C@@H]([C@@H]4OC(=O)C)OC(=O)C)C)OC(=O)C)O)C)[C@@H](CCC(C)C)O

Properties
Chemical formula	C_{33}H_{52}O_{8}
Molar mass	576.771 g·mol^{−1}
- Except where otherwise noted, data are given for materials in their standard state (at 25 °C [77 °F], 100 kPa). Infobox references

Agosterol A is a bio-active sterol which may have applications in removing multi-drug resistance in various cancers. It was first isolated from marine sponge but has also been produced synthetically.
