= Onnamide A =

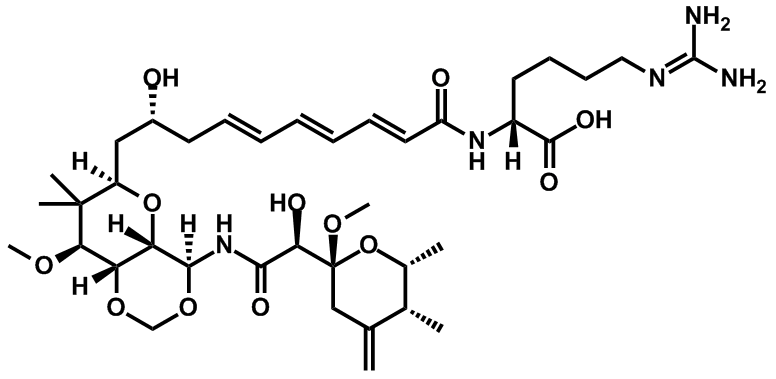

Names
- Other names (2S)-5-[(Diaminomethylene)amino]-2-({(2E,4E,6E,11R)-11-hydroxy-12-[(4S,4aS,6R,8S,8aR)-4-({(2S)-2-hydroxy-2-[(2R,5R,6R)-2-methoxy-5,6-dimethyl-4-methylenetetrahydro-2H-pyran-2-yl]acetyl}amino)-8-methox y-7,7-dimethylhexahydropyrano[3,2-d][1,3]dioxin-6-yl]-2,4,6-dodecatrienoyl}amino)pentanoic acid

Identifiers
CAS Number	115204-07-4
3D model (JSmol)	Interactive image
ChemSpider	8548572
PubChem CID	101526809
- InChI: InChI=1S/C39H63N5O12/c1-23-21-39(52-7,56-25(3)24(23)2)32(47)34(48)44-35-31-30(53-22-54-35)33(51-6)38(4,5)28(55-31)20-26(45)16-13-11-9-8-10-12-14-18-29(46)43-27(36(49)50)17-15-19-42-37(40)41/h8-10,12,14,18,24-28,30-33,35,45,47H,1,11,13,15-17,19-22H2,2-7H3,(H,43,46)(H,44,48)(H,49,50)(H4,40,41,42)/b9-8+,12-10+,18-14+/t24-,25-,26-,27+,28-,30+,31+,32+,33-,35+,39-/m1/s1 Key: YWUNVHXKGMPHDM-XTDHNIAMSA-N
- SMILES: C[C@H]1[C@H](O[C@](CC1=C)([C@@H](C(=O)N[C@@H]2[C@@H]3[C@@H]([C@H](C([C@H](O3)C[C@@H](CCC/C=C/C=C/C=C/C(=O)N[C@@H](CCCNC(=N)N)C(=O)O)O)(C)C)OC)OCO2)O)OC)C

Properties
Chemical formula	C_{39}H_{63}N_{5}O_{12}
Molar mass	793.956 g·mol^{−1}
- Except where otherwise noted, data are given for materials in their standard state (at 25 °C [77 °F], 100 kPa). Infobox references

Onnamide A is a bioactive natural product found in Theonella swinhoei, a species of marine sponge whose genus is well known for yielding a diverse set of biologically active natural products, including the swinholides and polytheonamides. It bears structural similarities to the pederins, a family of compounds known to inhibit protein synthesis in eukaryotic cells. Onnamide A and its analogues have attracted academic interest due to their cytotoxicity and potential for combating the growth and proliferation of cancer cells.

== History ==
Onnamide A was first isolated in 1988 from Theonella spp., a genus of marine sponges residing off the coast of Okinawa, Japan, as part of a bioassay aimed at discovering novel marine natural products possessing antiviral activity. Eight analogues possessing similar structure, as well as cytotoxicity were reported in 1992.

== Structure ==
Onnamide A is a complex biomolecule with a 39 unique carbon atoms and 11 degrees of unsaturation. Its core contains three rings, two of which comprise a dimeric lactone structure. It contains a long side chain that has a three conjugated trans- olefins that connects to an amide bond, terminating in an arginine residue. The stereochemical assignments of onnamide A have been extensively characterized by experimental and advanced NMR studies.

== Biosynthesis ==
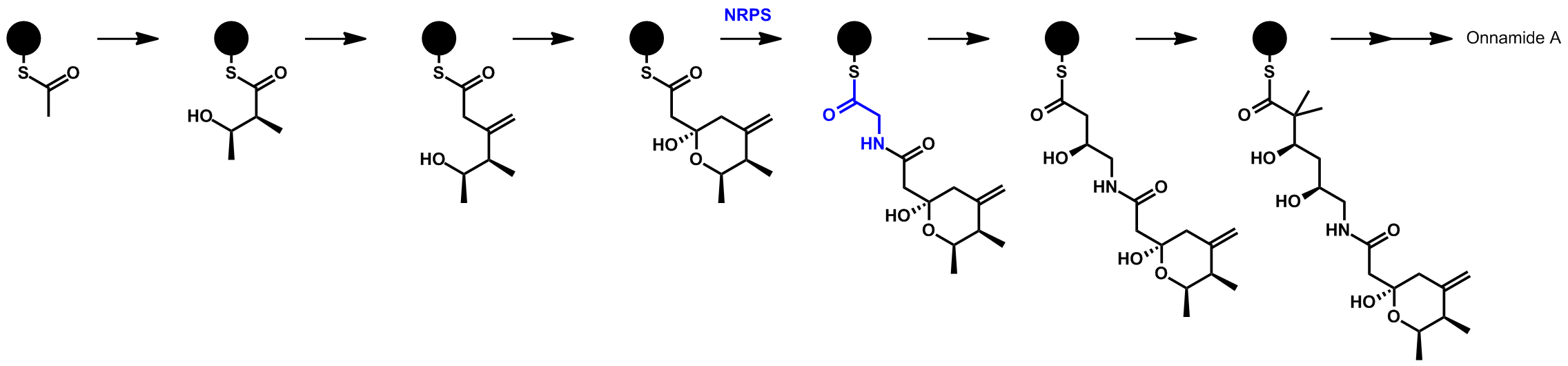

Genomic studies suggest strong homology with Ped genes, which encode the production of pederins, structurally similar compounds synthesized by bacterial endosymbionts of Paederus beetles. This suggests that onnamide A is actually the product of bacterial endosymbionts of the marine sponges from which the compound was first isolated. Thus, the biosynthetic pathway of onnamide A is envisioned to undertake analogous steps as those that lead to pederin, utilizing a prokaryotic PKS-NRPS system.

== Cytotoxicity ==
Onnamide A inhibits protein synthesis in cell lines, leading to induction of stress-activated protein kinases apoptosis in the affected cell. Its derivatives have been found to be highly toxic towards leukemic cells of the P388 cell line.

== See also ==
Pederin
