= Glembatumumab vedotin =

Monoclonal antibody
- Type: Whole antibody
- Source: Human
- Target: GPNMB

Clinical data
- ATC code: none

Legal status
- Legal status: Investigational

Identifiers
- CAS Number: 1182215-65-1 (glembatumumab)
- ChemSpider: none
- UNII: 1568H6A58U
- KEGG: D09912

Glembatumumab vedotin (also known as CDX-011 and CR011-vcMMAE) is an antibody-drug conjugate (ADC) that targets cancer cells expressing transmembrane glycoprotein NMB (GPNMB).

In May 2010, the U.S FDA granted Fast Track designation to CDX-011 for the treatment of advanced, refractory, or resistant GPNMB-expressing breast cancer.

== Structure and mechanism ==
The fully human IgG2 monoclonal antibody glembatumumab (CR011) is linked to monomethyl auristatin E (MMAE).

It uses a valine-citrulline enzyme-cleavable linker. The linkage is stable in the bloodstream. The antibody binds to GPNMB on the cancer cells, the ADC is internalised, the linkage is broken and MMAE is released to kill the cell.

In preclinical studies glembatumumab vedotin was capable of killing GPNMB expressing melanoma and breast cancer cells in vitro and inducing partial or complete regression of GPNMB-expressing tumors in mouse models.

== Development ==
Glembatumumab vedotin was in development through April 2018 by Celldex Therapeutics, who acquired CuraGen in 2009. It was originally developed through a partnership between CuraGen and Amgen, using Xenomouse technology licensed from Abgenix and ADC technology licensed from Seattle Genetics. In 2015, Celldex announced that it had formed a cooperative research and development agreement with NCI to sponsor two clinical trials for uveal melanoma and pediatric osteosarcoma. These were both phase II clinical trials.

== Clinical trials ==
In September 2010 a Phase 2b clinical study started of glembatumumab vedotin in 120 patients with GPNMB-expressing breast cancer including those with triple negative breast cancer.

As of June 2011, Phase I/II clinical trials of glembatumumab vedotin for the treatment of advanced melanoma and breast cancer have been completed but no official study result was posted. Preliminary results from these trials have shown that glembatumumab vedotin has some clinical activity (promotes tumor shrinkage) in both cancer types. Patients whose tumors express GPNMB respond better to glembatumumab and have longer progression-free survival than those whose tumors do not express GPNMB; in melanoma, and breast cancer.

An accelerated approval Phase II clinical trial (METRIC) investigating glembatumumab vedotin versus capecitabine (2:1 with crossover allowed) has begun in November 2013, expected to enroll 300 patients with GPNMB-expressing metastatic triple negative breast cancer. Patients who have progressed after receiving anthracyclines and taxanes are eligible.

Development of the ADC was discontinued in April 2018 after missing the primary endpoint of its study and failed to help women with tough-to-treat metastatic triple-negative breast cancers (TNBC) stay both alive and progression-free for longer than Roche Holding AG's Xeloda (capecitabine).
