= Dysidenin =

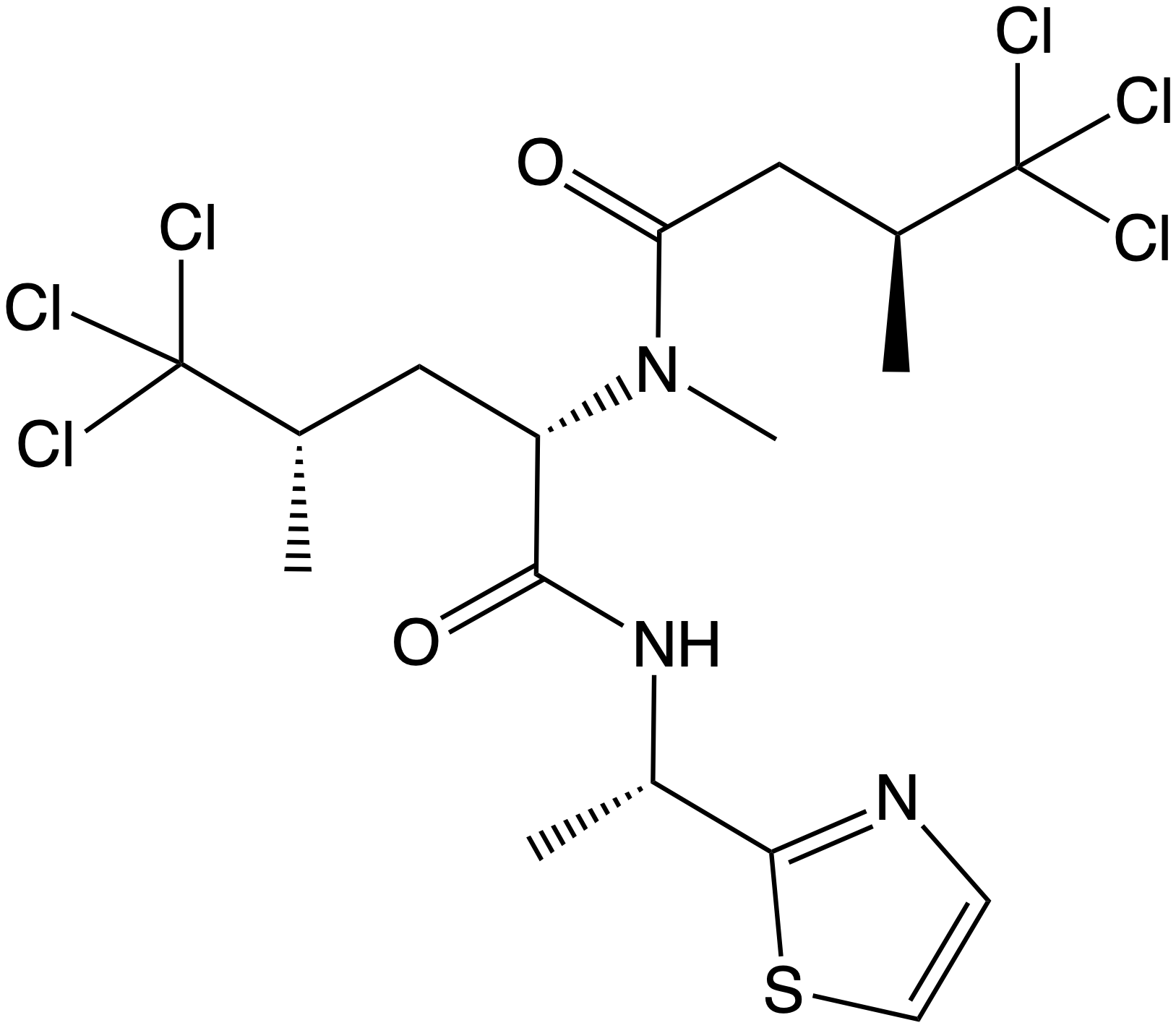

Names
- Systematic IUPAC name (2S,4S)-5,5,5-Trichloro-4-methyl-N-[(1S)-1-(1,3-thiazol-2-yl)ethyl]-2-[(3S)-4,4,4-trichloro-N,3-dimethylbutanamido]pentanamide
- Other names Dysidenine;Pentanamide, 5,5,5-trichloro-4-methyl-2-(methyl(4,4,4-trichloro-3-methyl-1-oxobutyl)amino)-N-(1-(2-thiazolyl)ethyl)-;(2S,4S)-5,5,5-Trichloro-4-methyl-2-[methyl[(S)-4,4,4-trichloro-3-methyl-1-oxobutyl]amino]-N-[(S)-1-(2-thiazolyl)ethyl]pentanamide

Identifiers
CAS Number	65647-65-6
3D model (JSmol)	Interactive image
ChEBI	CHEBI:189706
ChemSpider	8183181
PubChem CID	10007601
CompTox Dashboard (EPA)	DTXSID50984205
- InChI: InChI=1S/C17H23Cl6N3O2S/c1-9(16(18,19)20)7-12(14(28)25-11(3)15-24-5-6-29-15)26(4)13(27)8-10(2)17(21,22)23/h5-6,9-12H,7-8H2,1-4H3,(H,25,28)/t9-,10-,11-,12-/m0/s1 Key: BFVRAKVNXYQMID-BJDJZHNGSA-N; InChI=1/C17H23Cl6N3O2S/c1-9(16(18,19)20)7-12(14(28)25-11(3)15-24-5-6-29-15)26(4)13(27)8-10(2)17(21,22)23/h5-6,9-12H,7-8H2,1-4H3,(H,25,28)/t9-,10-,11-,12-/m0/s1 Key: BFVRAKVNXYQMID-BJDJZHNGBV
- SMILES: C[C@@H](C[C@@H](C(=O)N[C@@H](C)C1=NC=CS1)N(C)C(=O)C[C@H](C)C(Cl)(Cl)Cl)C(Cl)(Cl)Cl

Properties
Chemical formula	C_{17}H_{23}Cl_{6}N_{3}O_{2}S
Molar mass	546.166
Appearance	Fine white crystalline powder
Melting point	98 °C (208 °F; 371 K)

Hazards
- Occupational safety and health (OHS/OSH)
Main hazards	toxic
- Except where otherwise noted, data are given for materials in their standard state (at 25 °C [77 °F], 100 kPa). Infobox references

Dysidenin is an alkaloid toxin found in the marine sponge Lamellodysidea herbacea (previously known as Dysidea herbacea) which has a lethal effect on certain fish species and other marine organisms. The toxic mechanism of dysidenin is linked to its ability to inhibit iodide transport in thyroid cells. Dysidenin was originally isolated in 1977.

There is a regional variation in the metabolites produced by L. herbacea, as evidenced by the isolation of dysidenin from organism samples obtained from the Great Barrier Reef, while it was absent in samples from the Caroline Islands. This variation has been attributed to different strains of the cyanobacterium Hormoscilla spongeliae that are hosted by different morphological variations of the sponge.
