= Theonellamide F =

Names
- IUPAC name (1S,5R,7S,14S,17S,20S,23R,26S,30S,33S,36S,39S)-17-[(1R)-2-amino-1-hydroxy-2-oxoethyl]-20-(2-amino-2-oxoethyl)-33-benzyl-30-[(1S,2E,4E)-5-(4-bromophenyl)-1-hydroxy-3-methylpenta-2,4-dienyl]-14-[(4-bromophenyl)methyl]-5-hydroxy-39-[(1S)-1-hydroxyethyl]-26,36-bis(hydroxymethyl)-3,9,13,16,19,22,25,28,32,35,38,41-dodecaoxo-2,8,12,15,18,21,24,27,31,34,37,40,44,46-tetradecazatricyclo[21.18.6.1^{43,46}]octatetraconta-43(48),44-diene-7-carboxylic acid

Identifiers
3D model (JSmol)	Interactive image
ChemSpider	24603664
PubChem CID	45382310
CompTox Dashboard (EPA)	DTXSID301336378
- InChI: InChI=1S/C69H86Br2N16O22/c1-33(8-9-35-10-14-38(70)15-11-35)20-51(92)42-27-55(96)78-49(30-88)65(104)83-48-29-87-28-40(75-32-87)23-45(62(101)85-56(34(2)90)67(106)84-50(31-89)66(105)80-44(61(100)79-42)21-36-6-4-3-5-7-36)76-54(95)25-41(91)24-47(69(108)109)77-53(94)18-19-74-60(99)43(22-37-12-16-39(71)17-13-37)82-68(107)57(58(97)59(73)98)86-63(102)46(26-52(72)93)81-64(48)103/h3-17,20,28,32,34,41-51,56-58,88-92,97H,18-19,21-27,29-31H2,1-2H3,(H2,72,93)(H2,73,98)(H,74,99)(H,76,95)(H,77,94)(H,78,96)(H,79,100)(H,80,105)(H,81,103)(H,82,107)(H,83,104)(H,84,106)(H,85,101)(H,86,102)(H,108,109)/b9-8+,33-20+/t34-,41+,42-,43-,44-,45-,46-,47-,48+,49-,50-,51-,56-,57-,58+/m0/s1 Key: DAIPMSNAEZFUGV-BIWASUEOSA-N
- SMILES: C[C@@H]([C@H]1C(=O)N[C@H](C(=O)N[C@H](C(=O)N[C@@H](CC(=O)N[C@H](C(=O)N[C@@H]2CN3C=C(C[C@@H](C(=O)N1)NC(=O)C[C@@H](C[C@H](NC(=O)CCNC(=O)[C@@H](NC(=O)[C@@H](NC(=O)[C@@H](NC2=O)CC(=O)N)[C@H](C(=O)N)O)CC4=CC=C(C=C4)Br)C(=O)O)O)N=C3)CO)[C@H](/C=C(\C)/C=C/C5=CC=C(C=C5)Br)O)CC6=CC=CC=C6)CO)O

Properties
Chemical formula	C_{69}H_{86}Br_{2}N_{16}O_{22}
Molar mass	1651.345 g·mol^{−1}
- Except where otherwise noted, data are given for materials in their standard state (at 25 °C [77 °F], 100 kPa). Infobox references

Theonellamide F is an antifungal isolate of a sea sponge.
