= Phoriospongin =

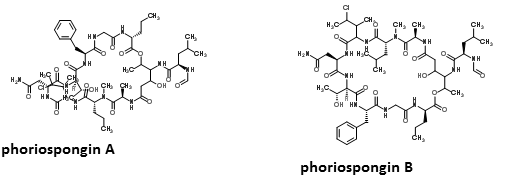
Phoriospongin A and B

Phoriospongin A and B are Australian sea sponge isolates with nematocidal activity. They are depsipeptides and were obtained from Phoriospongia species and Callyspongia bilamellata.
