= Ptilomycalin A =

Identifiers
CAS Number	124512-47-6
3D model (JSmol)	Interactive image
ChEMBL	ChEMBL1077545
ChemSpider	24665108
PubChem CID	46882529
- InChI: InChI=1S/C45H82N6O5.ClH/c1-3-38-24-16-17-28-44(56-38)35-37-26-27-39-41(45(29-21-23-36(2)55-45)49-43(48-44)51(37)39)42(53)54-34-20-14-12-10-8-6-4-5-7-9-11-13-15-25-40(52)50(33-22-31-47)32-19-18-30-46;/h36-39,41H,3-35,46-47H2,1-2H3,(H,48,49);1H/t36-,37+,38+,39-,41-,44+,45-;/m1./s1 Key: GDECEASHMSFVQR-GYZMTDKTSA-N
- SMILES: CC[C@H]1CCCC[C@]2(O1)C[C@@H]3CC[C@H]4[N+]3=C(N2)N[C@]5([C@H]4C(=O)OCCCCCCCCCCCCCCCC(=O)N(CCCCN)CCCN)CCC[C@H](O5)C.[Cl-]

Properties
Chemical formula	C_{45}H_{83}ClN_{6}O_{5}
Molar mass	823.65 g·mol^{−1}
- Except where otherwise noted, data are given for materials in their standard state (at 25 °C [77 °F], 100 kPa). Infobox references

Ptilomycalin A is an antifungal alkaloid isolated from a marine sponge.
