= Xestoquinone =

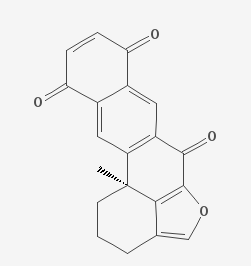

Names
- Preferred IUPAC name (12bS)-12b-Methyl-2,3-dihydro-1H-tetrapheno[5,4-bc]furan-6,8,11(12bH)-trione

Identifiers
CAS Number	97743-96-9
3D model (JSmol)	Interactive image
ChEMBL	ChEMBL510492
ChemSpider	109502
KEGG	C20073
PubChem CID	122838
UNII	V44PLT6RWZ
CompTox Dashboard (EPA)	DTXSID90913675
- InChI: InChI=1S/C20H14O4/c1-20-6-2-3-10-9-24-19(17(10)20)18(23)13-7-11-12(8-14(13)20)16(22)5-4-15(11)21/h4-5,7-9H,2-3,6H2,1H3/t20-/m0/s1 Key: HDONDRKCXFRHQQ-FQEVSTJZSA-N; InChI=1/C20H14O4/c1-20-6-2-3-10-9-24-19(17(10)20)18(23)13-7-11-12(8-14(13)20)16(22)5-4-15(11)21/h4-5,7-9H,2-3,6H2,1H3/t20-/m0/s1 Key: HDONDRKCXFRHQQ-FQEVSTJZBS
- SMILES: C[C@@]12CCCC3=COC(=C31)C(=O)C4=C2C=C5C(=O)C=CC(=O)C5=C4

Properties
Chemical formula	C_{20}H_{14}O_{4}
Molar mass	318.323
- Except where otherwise noted, data are given for materials in their standard state (at 25 °C [77 °F], 100 kPa). Infobox references

Xestoquinone is a bio-active isolate of the marine sponge Xestospongia.
