= Pseudopterosin E =

Names
- IUPAC name (2S,3S,4R,5S,6S)-2-[[(4R,6S,6aR,9S)-1-Hydroxy-3,6,9-trimethyl-4-(2-methylprop-1-enyl)-5,6,6a,7,8,9-hexahydro-4H-phenalen-2-yl]oxy]-6-methyloxane-3,4,5-triol

Identifiers
CAS Number	121011-80-1
3D model (JSmol)	Interactive image
ChemSpider	10472008
PubChem CID	72710730
UNII	JB99Y7528W
- InChI: InChI=1S/C26H38O6/c1-11(2)9-16-10-13(4)17-8-7-12(3)18-20(17)19(16)14(5)25(22(18)28)32-26-24(30)23(29)21(27)15(6)31-26/h9,12-13,15-17,21,23-24,26-30H,7-8,10H2,1-6H3/t12-,13-,15-,16-,17+,21+,23+,24-,26-/m0/s1 Key: LIAAPIYLHKRUNZ-BRPLUSLASA-N
- SMILES: C[C@H]1CC[C@@H]2[C@H](C[C@@H](C3=C(C(=C(C1=C23)O)O[C@H]4[C@H]([C@@H]([C@@H]([C@@H](O4)C)O)O)O)C)C=C(C)C)C

Properties
Chemical formula	C_{26}H_{38}O_{6}
Molar mass	446.584 g·mol^{−1}
- Except where otherwise noted, data are given for materials in their standard state (at 25 °C [77 °F], 100 kPa). Infobox references

Pseudopterosin E is an anti-inflammatory isolate from the Caribbean coral Pseudopterogorgia elisabethae.
