= Neamphamide A =

Identifiers
3D model (JSmol)	Interactive image
ChemSpider	21431291
PubChem CID	25093101
- InChI: InChI=1S/C75H125N21O23/c1-33(2)29-35(5)57(102)38(8)62(106)88-45(31-51(77)100)64(108)86-43(17-15-26-84-74(80)81)58(103)59(104)70(114)91-53(36(6)37(7)61(79)105)66(110)93-55-40(10)119-73(117)49-19-13-14-28-96(49)72(116)47(32-52(78)101)90-69(113)56(60(118-12)41-20-22-42(98)23-21-41)94-65(109)48(24-25-50(76)99)95(11)71(115)46(30-34(3)4)89-63(107)44(18-16-27-85-75(82)83)87-67(111)54(39(9)97)92-68(55)112/h20-23,33-40,43-49,53-60,97-98,102-104H,13-19,24-32H2,1-12H3,(H2,76,99)(H2,77,100)(H2,78,101)(H2,79,105)(H,86,108)(H,87,111)(H,88,106)(H,89,107)(H,90,113)(H,91,114)(H,92,112)(H,93,110)(H,94,109)(H4,80,81,84)(H4,82,83,85)/t35?,36-,37+,38?,39+,40+,43-,44+,45-,46-,47+,48-,49-,53-,54+,55+,56?,57?,58?,59?,60?/m0/s1 Key: MFLVVHMXLFFREB-OZERTKLCSA-N
- SMILES: C[C@@H]1[C@H](C(=O)N[C@@H](C(=O)N[C@@H](C(=O)N[C@H](C(=O)N([C@H](C(=O)NC(C(=O)N[C@@H](C(=O)N2CCCC[C@H]2C(=O)O1)CC(=O)N)C(C3=CC=C(C=C3)O)OC)CCC(=O)N)C)CC(C)C)CCCN=C(N)N)[C@@H](C)O)NC(=O)[C@H]([C@@H](C)[C@@H](C)C(=O)N)NC(=O)C(C([C@H](CCCN=C(N)N)NC(=O)[C@H](CC(=O)N)NC(=O)C(C)C(C(C)CC(C)C)O)O)O

Properties
Chemical formula	C_{75}H_{125}N_{21}O_{23}
Molar mass	1688.949 g·mol^{−1}
- Except where otherwise noted, data are given for materials in their standard state (at 25 °C [77 °F], 100 kPa). Infobox references

Neamphamide A is an HIV-inhibitory isolate of the sea sponge Neamphius huxleyi.
