= Mirabamide =

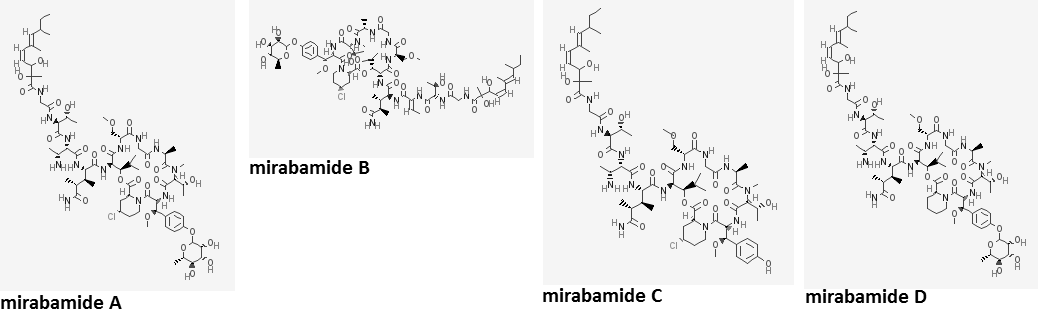
- Mirabamide A–D

Identifiers
3D model (JSmol)	A: Interactive image; B: Interactive image; C: Interactive image; D: Interactive image; E: Interactive image
ChEBI	C: CHEBI:68407; E: CHEBI:68403
ChEMBL	A: ChEMBL429406; B: ChEMBL249470; D: ChEMBL398500; E: ChEMBL1689426
ChemSpider	B: 29213836; E: 26393785
PubChem CID	A: 24179735; B: 24179622; C: 24179849; D: 24179734; E: 51041750
- InChI: A: InChI=1S/C72H114ClN13O25/c1-17-32(4)26-33(5)18-23-46(89)72(13,106)71(105)77-29-48(91)80-51(38(10)87)64(99)82-50(36(8)74)63(98)81-49(34(6)35(7)60(75)95)62(97)83-52-58(31(2)3)111-69(104)45-27-42(73)24-25-86(45)68(103)53(59(108-16)41-19-21-43(22-20-41)110-70-57(94)56(93)55(92)40(12)109-70)84-66(101)54(39(11)88)85(14)67(102)37(9)78-47(90)28-76-61(96)44(30-107-15)79-65(52)100/h18-23,26,31-32,34-40,42,44-46,49-59,70,87-89,92-94,106H,17,24-25,27-30,74H2,1-16H3,(H2,75,95)(H,76,96)(H,77,105)(H,78,90)(H,79,100)(H,80,91)(H,81,98)(H,82,99)(H,83,97)(H,84,101)/b23-18-,33-26+/t32?,34-,35+,36+,37-,38+,39+,40-,42-,44+,45-,46?,49-,50-,51-,52+,53+,54-,55-,56+,57+,58+,59+,70-,72?/m0/s1 Computed by InChI 1.0.6 (PubChem release 2021.05.07) Key: PYYXFJVIXGKIPV-IATOIQLISA-N; B: InChI=1S/C72H111ClN12O25/c1-17-33(5)27-34(6)19-24-47(88)72(13,105)71(104)76-30-49(90)80-51(38(10)86)64(98)78-44(18-2)62(96)81-50(35(7)36(8)60(74)94)63(97)82-52-58(32(3)4)110-69(103)46-28-42(73)25-26-85(46)68(102)53(59(107-16)41-20-22-43(23-21-41)109-70-57(93)56(92)55(91)40(12)108-70)83-66(100)54(39(11)87)84(14)67(101)37(9)77-48(89)29-75-61(95)45(31-106-15)79-65(52)99/h18-24,27,32-33,35-40,42,45-47,50-59,70,86-88,91-93,105H,17,25-26,28-31H2,1-16H3,(H2,74,94)(H,75,95)(H,76,104)(H,77,89)(H,78,98)(H,79,99)(H,80,90)(H,81,96)(H,82,97)(H,83,100)/b24-19-,34-27+,44-18-/t33?,35-,36+,37-,38+,39+,40-,42-,45+,46-,47?,50-,51-,52+,53+,54-,55-,56+,57+,58+,59+,70-,72?/m0/s1 Key: UHQCAXFLMDVFDC-NAUJABJQSA-N; C: InChI=1S/C66H104ClN13O21/c1-16-31(4)25-32(5)17-22-44(84)66(12,98)65(97)71-28-46(86)74-49(37(10)81)59(91)76-48(35(8)68)58(90)75-47(33(6)34(7)55(69)87)57(89)77-50-53(30(2)3)101-64(96)43-26-40(67)23-24-80(43)63(95)51(54(100-15)39-18-20-41(83)21-19-39)78-61(93)52(38(11)82)79(13)62(94)36(9)72-45(85)27-70-56(88)42(29-99-14)73-60(50)92/h17-22,25,30-31,33-38,40,42-44,47-54,81-84,98H,16,23-24,26-29,68H2,1-15H3,(H2,69,87)(H,70,88)(H,71,97)(H,72,85)(H,73,92)(H,74,86)(H,75,90)(H,76,91)(H,77,89)(H,78,93)/b22-17-,32-25+/t31?,33-,34+,35+,36-,37+,38+,40-,42+,43-,44?,47-,48-,49?,50+,51+,52-,53+,54+,66?/m0/s1 Key: VEJZPSFCBFZXDK-QGPFMVGKSA-N; D: InChI=1S/C72H115N13O25/c1-17-33(4)28-34(5)21-26-46(88)72(13,105)71(104)76-30-48(90)79-51(39(10)86)64(98)81-50(37(8)73)63(97)80-49(35(6)36(7)60(74)94)62(96)82-52-58(32(2)3)110-69(103)45-20-18-19-27-85(45)68(102)53(59(107-16)42-22-24-43(25-23-42)109-70-57(93)56(92)55(91)41(12)108-70)83-66(100)54(40(11)87)84(14)67(101)38(9)77-47(89)29-75-61(95)44(31-106-15)78-65(52)99/h21-26,28,32-33,35-41,44-46,49-59,70,86-88,91-93,105H,17-20,27,29-31,73H2,1-16H3,(H2,74,94)(H,75,95)(H,76,104)(H,77,89)(H,78,99)(H,79,90)(H,80,97)(H,81,98)(H,82,96)(H,83,100)/b26-21-,34-28+/t33?,35-,36+,37+,38-,39+,40+,41-,44+,45-,46?,49-,50-,51-,52+,53+,54-,55-,56+,57+,58+,59+,70-,72?/m0/s1 Key: NAEQWXPETBQBMW-WVBSTJMVSA-N; E: InChI=1S/C72H112ClN13O24/c1-17-33(5)27-34(6)19-24-47(88)72(13,105)71(104)77-30-49(90)79-44(18-2)62(96)82-51(37(9)74)64(98)81-50(35(7)36(8)60(75)94)63(97)83-52-58(32(3)4)110-69(103)46-28-42(73)25-26-86(46)68(102)53(59(107-16)41-20-22-43(23-21-41)109-70-57(93)56(92)55(91)40(12)108-70)84-66(100)54(39(11)87)85(14)67(101)38(10)78-48(89)29-76-61(95)45(31-106-15)80-65(52)99/h18-24,27,32-33,35-40,42,45-47,50-59,70,87-88,91-93,105H,17,25-26,28-31,74H2,1-16H3,(H2,75,94)(H,76,95)(H,77,104)(H,78,89)(H,79,90)(H,80,99)(H,81,98)(H,82,96)(H,83,97)(H,84,100)/b24-19-,34-27+,44-18-/t33?,35-,36+,37-,38-,39+,40-,42-,45+,46-,47?,50-,51-,52+,53+,54-,55-,56+,57+,58+,59+,70-,72?/m0/s1 Key: APTOZTHRCLKEEQ-OJHSLUOMSA-N
- SMILES: A: CCC(C)/C=C(\C)/C=C\C(C(C)(C(=O)NCC(=O)N[C@@H]([C@@H](C)O)C(=O)N[C@@H]([C@@H](C)N)C(=O)N[C@@H]([C@@H](C)[C@@H](C)C(=O)N)C(=O)N[C@@H]1[C@H](OC(=O)[C@@H]2C[C@H](CCN2C(=O)[C@H](NC(=O)[C@@H](N(C(=O)[C@@H](NC(=O)CNC(=O)[C@H](NC1=O)COC)C)C)[C@@H](C)O)[C@@H](C3=CC=C(C=C3)O[C@H]4[C@@H]([C@@H]([C@H]([C@@H](O4)C)O)O)O)OC)Cl)C(C)C)O)O; B: CCC(C)/C=C(\C)/C=C\C(C(C)(C(=O)NCC(=O)N[C@@H]([C@@H](C)O)C(=O)N/C(=C\C)/C(=O)N[C@@H]([C@@H](C)[C@@H](C)C(=O)N)C(=O)N[C@@H]1[C@H](OC(=O)[C@@H]2C[C@H](CCN2C(=O)[C@H](NC(=O)[C@@H](N(C(=O)[C@@H](NC(=O)CNC(=O)[C@H](NC1=O)COC)C)C)[C@@H](C)O)[C@@H](C3=CC=C(C=C3)O[C@H]4[C@@H]([C@@H]([C@H]([C@@H](O4)C)O)O)O)OC)Cl)C(C)C)O)O; C: CCC(C)\C=C(C)\C=C/C(O)C(C)(O)C(=O)NCC(=O)NC([C@@H](C)O)C(=O)N[C@@H]([C@@H](C)N)C(=O)N[C@@H]([C@@H](C)[C@@H](C)C(N)=O)C(=O)N[C@@H]1[C@H](OC(=O)[C@@H]2C[C@@H](Cl)CCN2C(=O)[C@H](NC(=O)[C@H]([C@@H](C)O)N(C)C(=O)[C@H](C)NC(=O)CNC(=O)[C@@H](COC)NC1=O)[C@H](OC)c1ccc(O)cc1)C(C)C; D: CCC(C)/C=C(\C)/C=C\C(C(C)(C(=O)NCC(=O)N[C@@H]([C@@H](C)O)C(=O)N[C@@H]([C@@H](C)N)C(=O)N[C@@H]([C@@H](C)[C@@H](C)C(=O)N)C(=O)N[C@@H]1[C@H](OC(=O)[C@@H]2CCCCN2C(=O)[C@H](NC(=O)[C@@H](N(C(=O)[C@@H](NC(=O)CNC(=O)[C@H](NC1=O)COC)C)C)[C@@H](C)O)[C@@H](C3=CC=C(C=C3)O[C@H]4[C@@H]([C@@H]([C@H]([C@@H](O4)C)O)O)O)OC)C(C)C)O)O; E: CCC(C)\C=C(C)\C=C/C(O)C(C)(O)C(=O)NCC(=O)N\C(=C/C)C(=O)N[C@@H]([C@H](C)N)C(=O)N[C@@H]([C@@H](C)[C@@H](C)C(N)=O)C(=O)N[C@@H]1[C@H](OC(=O)[C@@H]2C[C@@H](Cl)CCN2C(=O)[C@H](NC(=O)[C@H]([C@@H](C)O)N(C)C(=O)[C@H](C)NC(=O)CNC(=O)[C@@H](COC)NC1=O)[C@H](OC)c1ccc(O[C@@H]2O[C@@H](C)[C@H](O)[C@@H](O)[C@H]2O)cc1)C(C)C
- Except where otherwise noted, data are given for materials in their standard state (at 25 °C [77 °F], 100 kPa). Infobox references

Mirabamides are sea sponge isolates that inhibit HIV-1 fusion. Variants A to D are known from Siliquariaspongia mirabilis and E through H are derived from Stelletta clavosa. Mirabamides have a macrocyclic region closed through an ester bond between the C-terminus and a 𝛽-hydroxyl group, and terminated with a polyketide moiety or a more simple branched aliphatic acid.

Mirabamide G is a fusion of several amino acids: 2,3 diamino butanoic acid, 3-hydroxyleucine, N-methylthreonine, 2,3-dihydroxy-2,6,8-trimethyldeca-(4Z,6E)-dienoic acid, 3-methoxy alanine, β-methoxytyrosine, 3,4-dimethylglutamine.
