= Cyclic peptide =

Peptide chains which contain a circular sequence of bonds

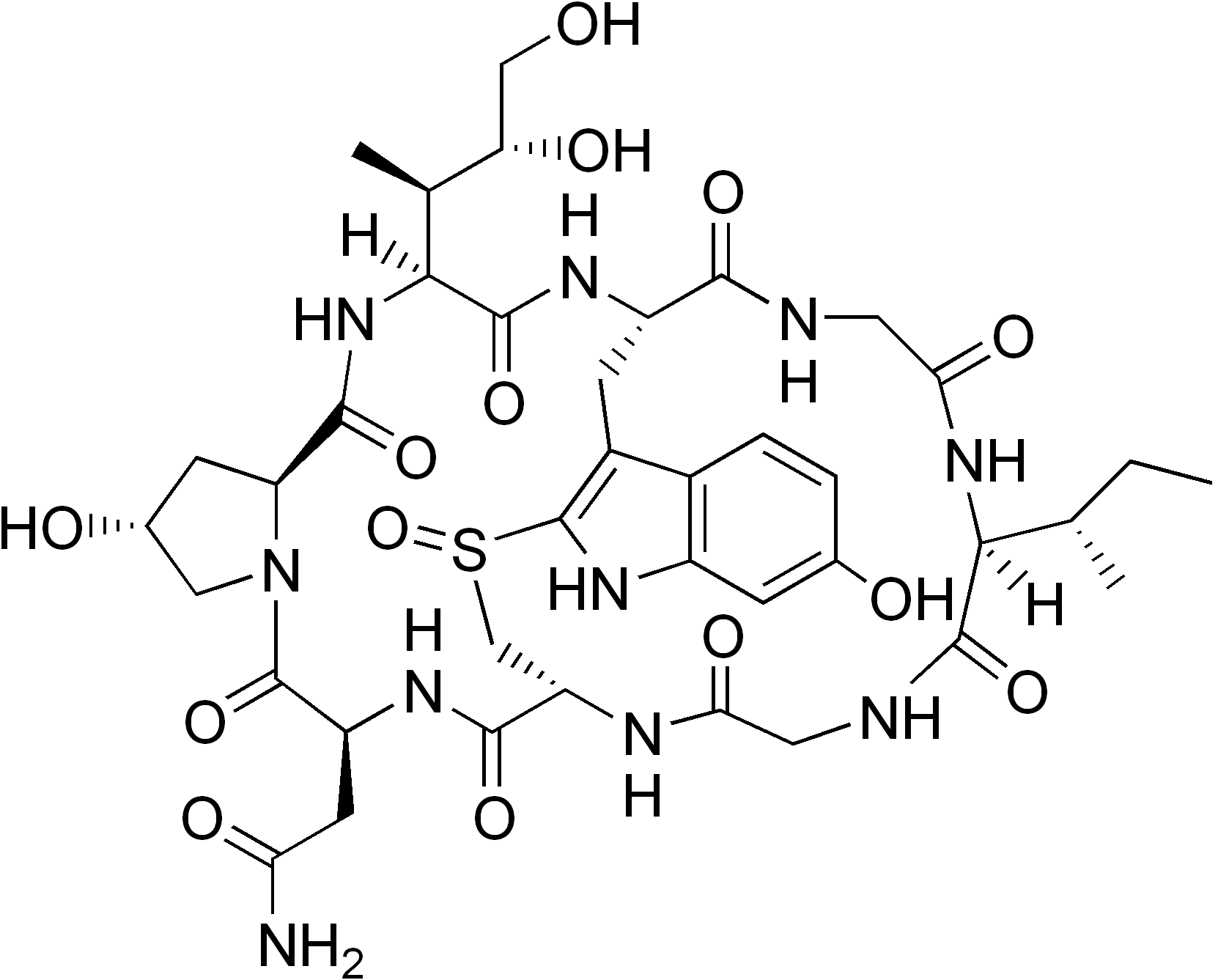
α-Amanitin

Bacitracin

Ciclosporin

Cyclic peptides are polypeptide chains which contain a circular sequence of bonds. This can be through a connection between the amino and carboxyl ends of the peptide, for example in cyclosporin; a connection between the amino end and a side chain, for example in bacitracin; the carboxyl end and a side chain, for example in colistin; or two side chains or more complicated arrangements, for example in alpha-amanitin. Many cyclic peptides have been discovered in nature and many others have been synthesized in the laboratory. Their length ranges from just two amino acid residues to hundreds. In nature they are frequently antimicrobial or toxic; in medicine they have various applications, for example as antibiotics and immunosuppressive agents. Thin-Layer Chromatography (TLC) is a convenient method to detect cyclic peptides in crude extract from bio-mass.

== Classification ==
Cyclic peptides can be classified according to the types of bonds that comprise the ring.

- Homodetic cyclic peptides, such as cyclosporine A, are those in which the ring is composed exclusively of normal peptide bonds (i.e. between the alpha carboxyl of one residue to the alpha amine of another). The smallest such species are 2,5-diketopiperazines, being derived from the cyclisation of a dipeptide.
- Cyclic isopeptides contain at least one non-alpha amide linkage, such as a linkage between the side chain of one residue to the alpha carboxyl group of another residue, as in the microcystins.
- Cyclic depsipeptides, such as aureobasidin A and HUN-7293, have at least one ester functional group in place of one of the amide groups. Some cyclic depsipeptides are cyclized between the C-terminal carboxyl and the side chain of a Thr or Ser residue in the chain, such as kahalalide F, theonellapeptolide, and didemnin B.
- Bicyclics such as the amanitins and the phalloidins contain a bridging group, generally between two of the side chains. In alpha-amanitin, this is formed as a sulfoxide bridge between the Trp and Cys residues. Other bicyclic peptides include echinomycin, triostin A, celogentin C and moroidin.
- There are a number of cyclic peptides which are cyclized only through a disulfide bond between two cysteines, the neurotransmitter oxytocin being a notable example.
- Cyclotides are a family of cysteine-rich peptides characterized by six conserved cysteines that form three disulfide bonds within the cyclic structure forming the characteristic cyclic cystine knot (CCK) that confers these peptides their characteristic 3D structure and it is believed to be greatly responsible for the stability and properties of these substances.

== Biosynthesis ==
Cyclic peptides in plants are synthesized via a two-step process; the translation of a linear peptide chain, and its subsequent formation into a cyclic structure through activities of a protease-like enzyme or other ways.

Some peptides, such as cyclotides, are gene-coded products obtained by the processing of larger precursor proteins. The generic configuration of the precursor protein consists of an endoplasmic reticulum signal sequence, a non-conserved pro-region, a highly conserved region known as the N-terminal repeat (NTR), the mature cyclotide domain and finally a short hydrophobic C-terminal tail.

== Properties and applications ==
Cyclic peptides tend to be extremely resistant to the process of digestion, making them of interest to scientists working on novel oral medications.

Examples include:

- Amanitins
- Bacitracin
- Colistin
- Ciclosporin
- Dactinomycin
- Daptomycin
- Gramicidin S
- Hymenistatin
- Microcystins
- Nisin
- Nodularin
- Octreotide
- Polymyxin B
- Pristinamycin
- Valinomycin (technically a depsipeptide)
- Vancomycin
- Viscumamide
- Yunnanin A

== See also ==
- Stapled peptide
- Nonribosomal peptide
- Lantibiotics, 19-37 residues and 1 to 5 'bridges'
- Split-intein circular ligation of peptides and proteins
- Ribosomally synthesized and post-translationally modified peptides
