= Cramp balls =

Cramp balls is the common name for three genera of fungi:

- Daldinia concentrica
- Annulohypoxylon
- Hypoxylon
