= Penicillium saturniforme =

Scientific classification
- Kingdom: Fungi
- Division: Ascomycota
- Class: Eurotiomycetes
- Order: Eurotiales
- Family: Aspergillaceae
- Genus: Penicillium
- Species: P. saturniforme

Binomial name
- Penicillium saturniforme (L.Wang & W.Y.Zhuang) Houbraken & Samson (2011)

Synonyms
- Eupenicillium saturniforme L.Wang & W.Y.Zhuang (2009)

Species of fungus

Penicillium saturniforme is a species of fungus in the genus Penicillium. It was first described in 2009 as a species of Eupenicillium in 2009, but transferred to the genus Penicillium two years later. The fungus was isolated from soil in Jilin Province, China. Phylogenetically close species are P. glabrum, P. lividum, P. purpurascens, P. spinulosum, and P. thomii all of which are in the subgenus Aspergilloides.
