= Mellivory =

Consumption of honey

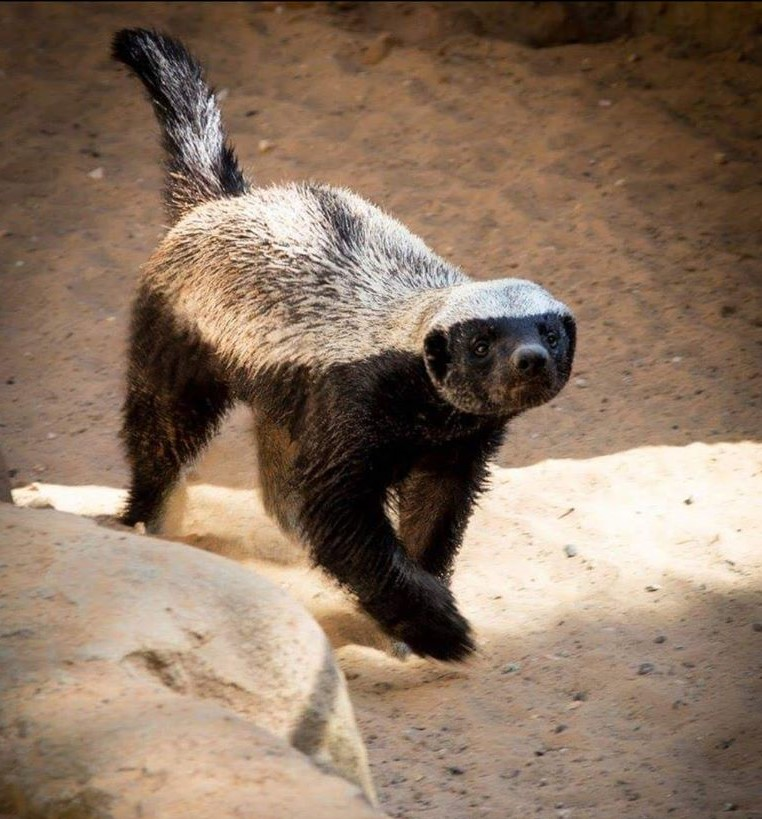
Honey badgers (genus Mellivora) are named for their diet of honey.

Mellivory is a term for the eating of honey. Honey is a sweet and viscous substance created by some eusocial insects, notably bees, for consumption by members of their hives, especially their young. Honey is also consumed by many other animals including human beings, who have developed beekeeping to make supplies of honey both reliable and plentiful. Despite honey's limited antimicrobial properties (caused by the very high osmotic pressure of its concentrated sugars), it remains a food source for a variety of microorganisms.

== Etymology ==
The word mellivory derives from the Latin mel, "honey", and -vorous, "-eating".

== Nutrition ==
Honey is a syrup composed of several simple sugars, primarily fructose and glucose. Wild honey also contains traces of bee larvae, adding fat, protein, vitamins, and minerals. In many environments honey is the single richest source of carbohydrates for the organisms that consume it. It has been suggested that the concentrated energy provided by honey is in part what allowed humans to evolve such large brains, as large brains are metabolically expensive. Honey also has limited antimicrobial properties.

== Mellivory by humans ==
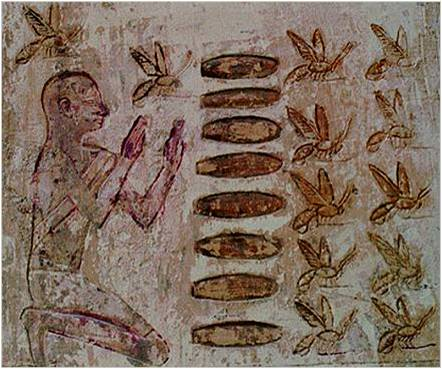
Illustration of an Egyptian honey harvest in the sun temple of Niuserre, c. 25th-century BCE

=== Food ===
Over its history as a food the main uses of honey have lain in cooking, baking, confection, as a spread on bread, as an addition to various beverages such as tea, and as a sweetener in some commercial beverages.

Due to its energy density, honey is an important food for virtually all hunter-gatherer cultures in warm climates, with the Hadza people ranking honey as their favorite food. Honey hunters in Africa have a mutualistic relationship with certain species of honeyguide birds.

=== Fermentation ===
Possibly the world's oldest fermented beverage, dating from 9,000 years ago, mead (also known as honey wine) is the alcoholic product made by adding yeast to honey-water must and fermenting it for weeks or months. The yeast Saccharomyces cerevisiae is commonly used in modern mead production.

Mead varieties include drinks called metheglin (with spices or herbs), melomel (with fruit juices, such as grape, specifically called pyment), hippocras (with cinnamon), and sack mead (with a high concentration of honey). Honey is also used to make mead beer, called "braggot".

=== Traditional medicine ===
Honey is a folk treatment for burns and other skin injuries. Preliminary evidence suggests that it aids in the healing of partial thickness burns 4–5 days faster than other dressings, and moderate evidence suggests that post-operative infections treated with honey heal faster and with fewer adverse events than with antiseptic and gauze. Honey has long been used as a topical antibiotic by practitioners of traditional and herbal medicine.

In myths and folk medicine, honey was used both orally and topically to treat various ailments including gastric disturbances, ulcers, skin wounds, and skin burns by ancient Greeks and Egyptians, and in Ayurveda and traditional Chinese medicine. Honey is used in apitherapy as a form of alternative medicine.

=== Religious consumption ===
Humans consume honey as parts of some religions. In Judaism during Rosh Hashanah, apples are dipped in honey as a siman (symbol/omen) for a sweet new year. The custom is referenced neither in Tanach or the Talmud; one of its earliest mentions is in the interpolation of Rabbi Moses Isserless to the Shulchan Aruch, which he cites as a non-universal custom—unlike other Rosh Hashana simanim like beets and leek. Nevertheless, the custom has grown to become nearly universal. Some suggest the custom has different or more ancient origins; Dr. Jefferey Cohen suggests the custom is a reminder of the manna provided by God to the Israelites as sustenance while wandering through the desert for 40 years. In Hinduism, honey (Madhu) is one of the five elixirs of life (Panchamrita). In temples, honey is poured over the deities in a ritual called Madhu abhisheka. The Vedas and other ancient literature mention the use of honey as a great medicinal and health food. In Buddhism, honey plays an important role in the festival of Madhu Purnima, celebrated in India and Bangladesh. The day commemorates Buddha's making peace among his disciples by retreating into the wilderness. According to legend, while he was there a monkey brought him honey to eat. On Madhu Purnima, Buddhists remember this act by giving honey to monks. The monkey's gift is frequently depicted in Buddhist art. In Islam, according to the hadith, Muhammad strongly recommended honey for healing purposes. The Quran promotes honey as a nutritious and healthy food.

== Mellivory by nonhuman animals ==
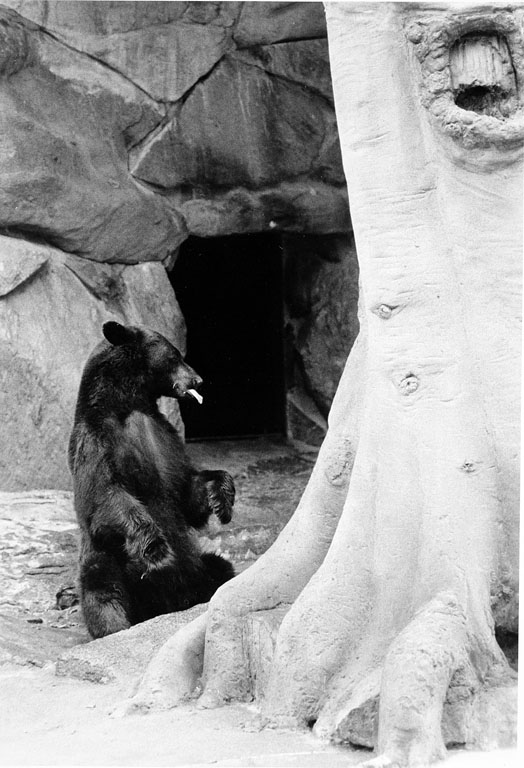
Smokey Bear eating honey and berries in his enclosure in the National Zoo in 1984

=== By invertebrates ===
There are several species of insects that are considered pests in beekeeping. Notably, small hive beetles, the unaptly named bee louse (a species of fly), ants, wasps and wax moths such as Galleria mellonella and Achroia grisella cause damage by eating honey directly. Bees themselves also feed honey to their larvae. Western honey bees will rob honey from other hives, as will yellowjacket wasps. In the Nomada genus, which is a genus of cleptoparasites, the female enters a beehive to deposit her eggs, and leaves. The offspring will eat the hive's resources and eventually leave themselves.

=== By vertebrates ===
Honey is eaten by several types of mammals, notably skunks, raccoons, opossums, kinkajous, bears, and honey badgers. Bears in particular are stereotyped as commonly attacking beehives, which does happen in nature. Bears are attracted to beehives for not just the honey, but also larvae and immature honey bees, which provide fat and protein. The Russian term for bear, literally "Honey Eater", reflects this. Honey badgers are also well known for raiding beehives and eating honey, and are named after this part of their diet.

Honey and beeswax are also eaten by some birds, including honey buzzards and honeyguides, the latter of which are known to guide humans to bee colonies in order to partake in foraging mutualism.

== Mellivory by microorganisms ==
Honey, despite having limited antimicrobial properties, is consumed by some microorganisms, particularly yeasts and spore-forming bacteria. Notable fungi found in honey are Alternaria alternata, Aspergillus niger, Aspergillus proliferans, Aspergillus spelunceus, Chaetomium globosum, Cladosporium cladosporioides, Daldinia concentrica, Emericella discophora, Emericella qinqixianii, Penicillium corylophilum, Penicillium decumbens, Penicillium polonicum, and Penicillium echinulatum, while notable bacteria species are Debaryomyces hansenii, Zygosaccharomyces rouxii, Zygosaccharomyces mellis, Aureobasidium pullulans, and Cryptococcus uzbekistanensis.
