= Penicillium fusisporum =

Scientific classification
- Kingdom: Fungi
- Division: Ascomycota
- Class: Eurotiomycetes
- Order: Eurotiales
- Family: Aspergillaceae
- Genus: Penicillium
- Species: P. fusisporum

Binomial name
- Penicillium fusisporum L.Wang (2014)

Species of fungus

Penicillium fusisporum is a fungus species in the family Trichocomaceae. Described as new to science in 2014, it was isolated from plant leaves in China. It is closely related to Penicillium thomii var. flavescens.

== See also ==
- List of Penicillium species
