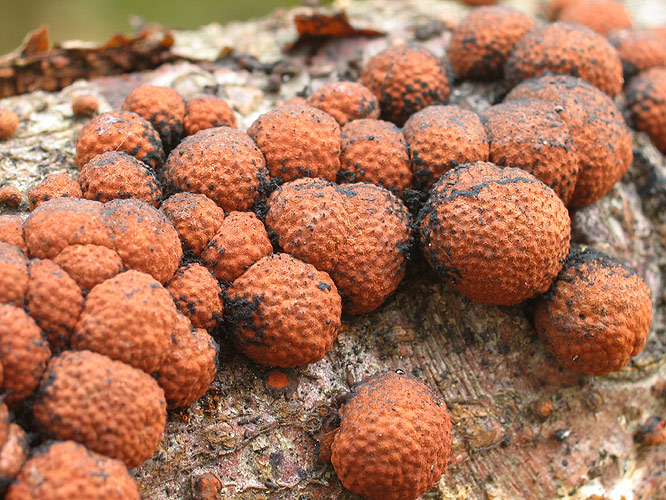

Scientific classification
- Domain: Eukaryota
- Kingdom: Fungi
- Division: Ascomycota
- Class: Sordariomycetes
- Order: Xylariales
- Family: Hypoxylaceae
- Genus: Hypoxylon
- Species: H. fragiforme

Binomial name
- Hypoxylon fragiforme (Pers.) J.Kickx f. (1835)

Synonyms
- Sphaeria fragiformis Pers. (1794)

= Hypoxylon fragiforme =

Species of fungus

Hypoxylon fragiforme is a multiperitheciate carbonaceous pyrenomycete known from Europe and North America.

== Description ==
It is saprobic on wood, mostly beech. The semispherical lumps are up to 15 millimetres (5/8 in) wide and covered with 15–25 bumps in maturity. The flesh is hard and black. Specimens are reddish when young, and they produce orange pigments when mixed with KOH.

=== Similar species ===
Similar species include Hypoxylon howeianum, which can be differentiated microscopically by smaller ascospores. The anamorph of H. fragiforme sits on a fuzzy green subiculum while the anamorph of H. howeianum sits on radiating hyphal cords, reminiscent of a white spiderweb-like structure.

Other similar species exist within Annulohypoxylon, Nemania, and Rosellinia.
