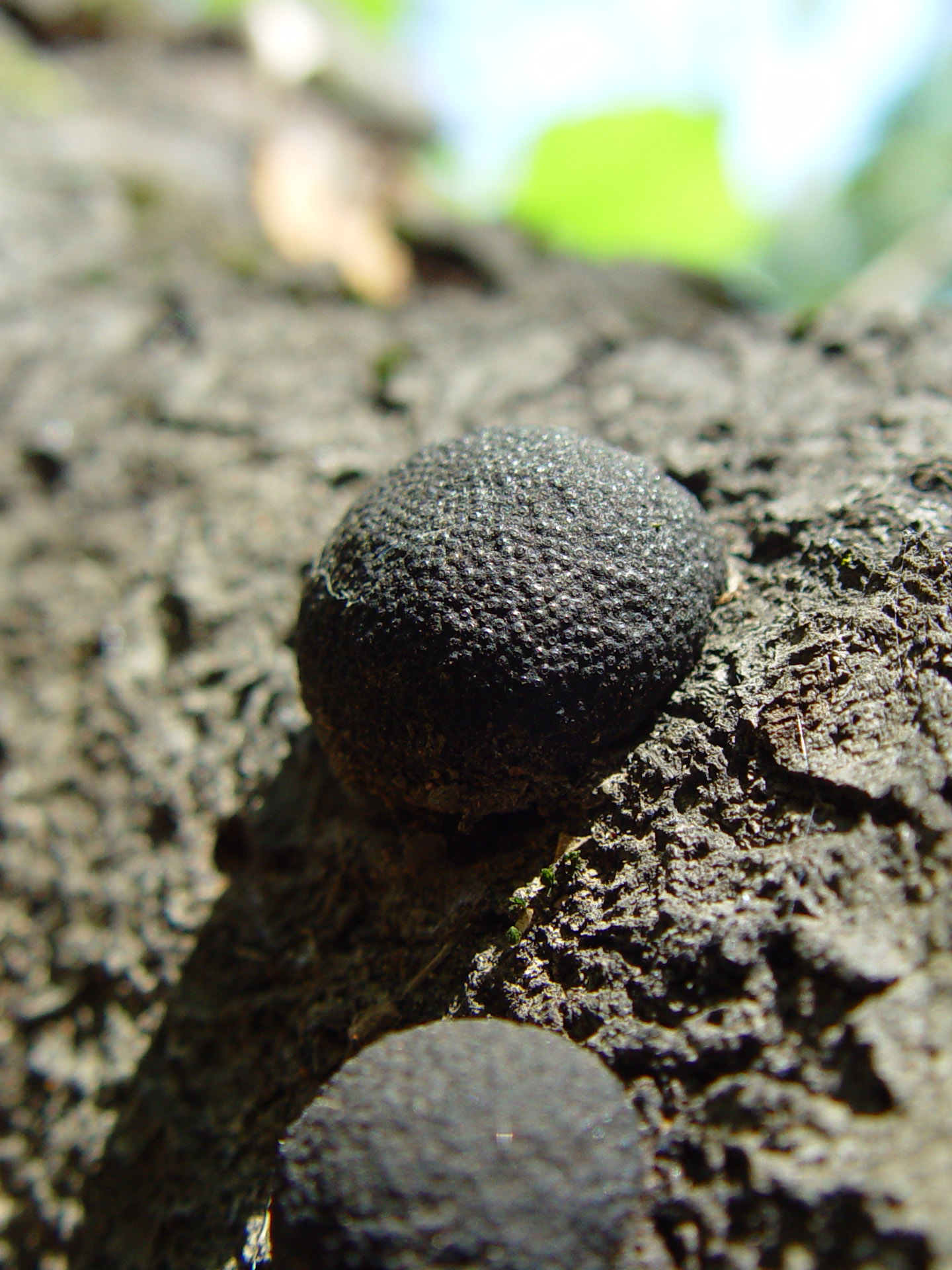

Scientific classification
- Domain: Eukaryota
- Kingdom: Fungi
- Division: Ascomycota
- Class: Sordariomycetes
- Order: Xylariales
- Family: Xylariaceae
- Genus: Annulohypoxylon
- Species: A. thouarsianum

Binomial name
- Annulohypoxylon thouarsianum (Lév.) Y.M. Ju, J.D. Rogers & H.M. Hsieh

Synonyms
- Hypoxylon africanum Van der Byl; Hypoxylon thouarsianum var. gilletianum (Sacc.) J.H. Mill.; Daldinia thouarsiana (Lév.) Sacc.; Hypoxylon thouarsianum (Lév.) Lloyd; Hypoxylon thouarsianum var. macrosporum F. San Martín, Y.M. Ju & J.D. Rogers; Sphaeria thouarsiana Lév.; Hypoxylon amaniense Henn.; Hemisphaeria thouarsiana (Lév.) Kuntze; Hypoxylon gilletianum Sacc.; Daldinia malleola (Berk. & Ravenel) Kauffman; Hypoxylon malleolus Berk. & Ravenel; Annulohypoxylon thouarsianum var. macrosporum (F. San Martín, Y.M. Ju & J.D. Rogers) Y.M. Ju, J.D. Rogers & H.M. Hsieh; Hypoxylon occidentale Ellis & Everh.

= Annulohypoxylon thouarsianum =

Common fungus

Annulohypoxylon thouarsianum is a species of ascomycete fungus.

== Description ==
The species grows on the bark of decaying hardwood trees. Its fruiting body is sessile, and ranges from 1 to 5 centimetres (1/2 to 2 in) wide. The surface of the fruiting body is dark brown or black and has a rough texture due to the high number of perithecia.

=== Similar species ===
Various other Annulohypoxylon species are similar, as is Daldinia childiae. Species of Jackrogersella, Rosellinia, and Nemania have fewer bumps.

== Distribution ==
Annulohypoxylon thouarsianum is most commonly found along the United States' West Coast, in the Eastern U.S., and in Mexico.

== Taxonomy ==
The species was moved from the genus Hypoxylon to Annulohypoxylon in 2005. The following varieties are recognized:

- A. t. macrosporum
- A. t. thouarsianum
