= Penicillium verruculosum =

Scientific classification
- Kingdom: Fungi
- Division: Ascomycota
- Class: Eurotiomycetes
- Order: Eurotiales
- Family: Aspergillaceae
- Genus: Penicillium
- Species: P. verruculosum

Binomial name
- Penicillium verruculosum Peyronel, B. 1913

Type strain
- ATCC 10513, CBS 388.38, CBS 388.48, DSM 2263, FRR 1050, IAM 13756, IFM 47728, IFO 9586, IMI 040039, JCM 22808, KCTC 6443, MUCL 38781, NBRC 9586, NRRL 1050, Thom 5179.3

Synonyms
- Talaromyces verruculosus, Penicillium aculeatum var. apiculatum, Penicillium mirabile

Species of fungus

Penicillium velutinum is an anamorph species of fungus in the genus Penicillium which was isolated from soil in the United States. It produces verruculogen, verrucosidin, verruculotoxin, decalpenic acid, dehydroaltenusin, cyciooctasulfur, atrovenetinone, altenusin and penitrem A
