= Penicillium thiersii =

Scientific classification
- Domain: Eukaryota
- Kingdom: Fungi
- Division: Ascomycota
- Class: Eurotiomycetes
- Order: Eurotiales
- Family: Aspergillaceae
- Genus: Penicillium
- Species: P. thiersii

Binomial name
- Penicillium thiersii Peterson, S.W.; Bayer, E.M.; Wicklow, D.T. 2004

Type strain
- NRRL 28147

Species of fungus

Penicillium thiersii is a species of fungus in the genus Penicillium which was isolated from a wood decay fungi (Hypoxylon) in Wisconsin in North America. Penicillium thiersii produces thiersindole A, thiersindole B, thiersindole C, oxalicine A and oxalicine B
