= Streptomyces tremellae =

Scientific classification
- Domain: Bacteria
- Kingdom: Bacillati
- Phylum: Actinomycetota
- Class: Actinomycetia
- Order: Streptomycetales
- Family: Streptomycetaceae
- Genus: Streptomyces
- Species: S. tremellae

Binomial name
- Streptomyces tremellae Wen et al. 2016

Type strain
- CCTCC M 2011365, JCM 30846, Js-1

Synonyms
- Streptomyces fujianensis

Species of bacterium

Streptomyces tremellae is a bacterium species from the genus Streptomyces which has been isolated from the mushroom Tremella fuciformis from Gutian in China.

== See also ==
- List of Streptomyces species
