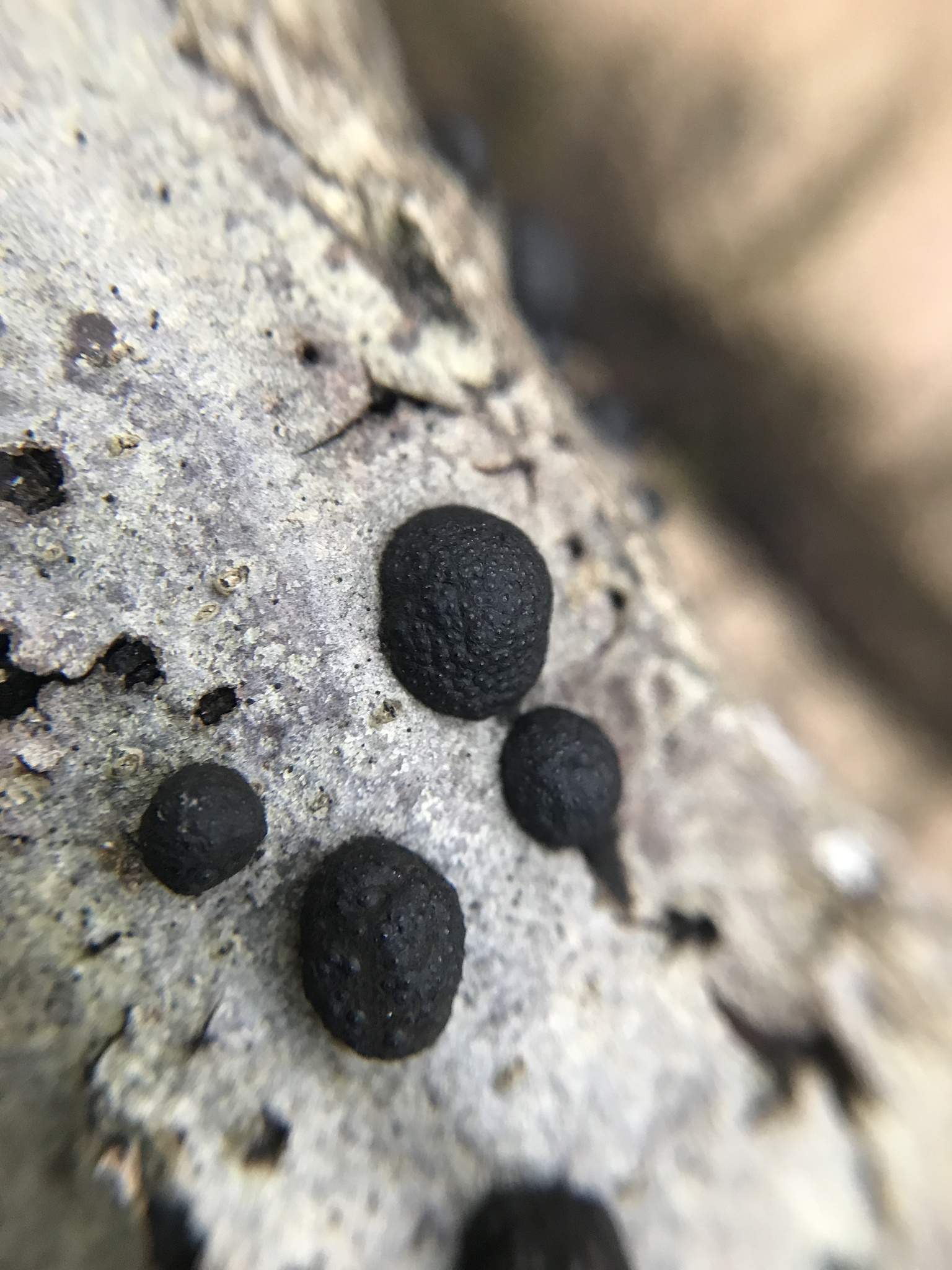

Scientific classification
- Domain: Eukaryota
- Kingdom: Fungi
- Division: Ascomycota
- Class: Sordariomycetes
- Order: Xylariales
- Family: Xylariaceae
- Genus: Annulohypoxylon
- Species: A. annulatum

Binomial name
- Annulohypoxylon annulatum (Schwein.) Y.M.Ju, J.D.Rogers & H.M.Hsieh

Synonyms
- Hypoxylon annulatum (Schwein.) Mont.; Hypoxylon circumscribum Lloyd; Hypoxylon marginatum Berk.; Hypoxylon marginatum subsp. emarginata Theiss., 1909; Hypoxylon marginatum var. emarginata Theiss.; Hypoxylon vernicosum Ellis & Everh.; Sphaeria annulata Schwein.; Sphaeria marginata Schwein.

= Annulohypoxylon annulatum =

Species of fungus

Annulohypoxylon annulatum is a pyrenomycete, a carbonaceous fungus that produces its ascospores in perithecia (flask shaped container), and then shoots them out through an opening called the ostiole. Annulohypoxylon was derived from the original genus Hypoxylon in 2005 and is distinguished by their flat, disk-like rings encircling the ostioles (hence the annulo- prefix). The stromata (fruiting bodies) of A. annulatum are semi-globose to cushion-like and are black in color. They are covered in ostioles (pimple-like in appearance) surrounded by a flat disc area. A hand lens may be needed in order to see this. This species commonly grows on oak and when crushed and mixed with potassium hydroxide will produce an olive green pigment. Microscopically, "ascospores brown to dark brown, ellipsoid-inequilateral, 7.5–12 × 3.5–5 μm, with straight germ slit spore-length".
