= Annulohypoxylon archeri =

Scientific classification
- Domain: Eukaryota
- Kingdom: Fungi
- Division: Ascomycota
- Class: Sordariomycetes
- Order: Xylariales
- Family: Xylariaceae
- Genus: Annulohypoxylon
- Species: A. archeri

Binomial name
- Annulohypoxylon archeri Berk.

Species of fungus

Annulohypoxylon archeri (formerly Hypoxylon archeri) is a saprophytic fungus species. It was moved from the genus Hypoxylon into the genus Annulohypoxylon erected in 2005 by Hsieh, Ju and Rogers.

A. archeri is commonly used in the cultivation of Tremella fuciformis - one of the foremost medicinal and culinary fungi of China and Taiwan. Tremella fuciformis is a parasitic yeast that does not form an edible fruitbody without parasitizing another fungus. Annulohypoxylon archeri is its preferred host, so cultivators usually pair cultures of Tremella fuciformis with this species, or others in the former genus Hypoxylon (now spread into two genera – Hypoxylon and Annulohypoxylon).

== See also ==
- Annulohypoxylon
- Hypoxylon
- Tremella fuciformis
