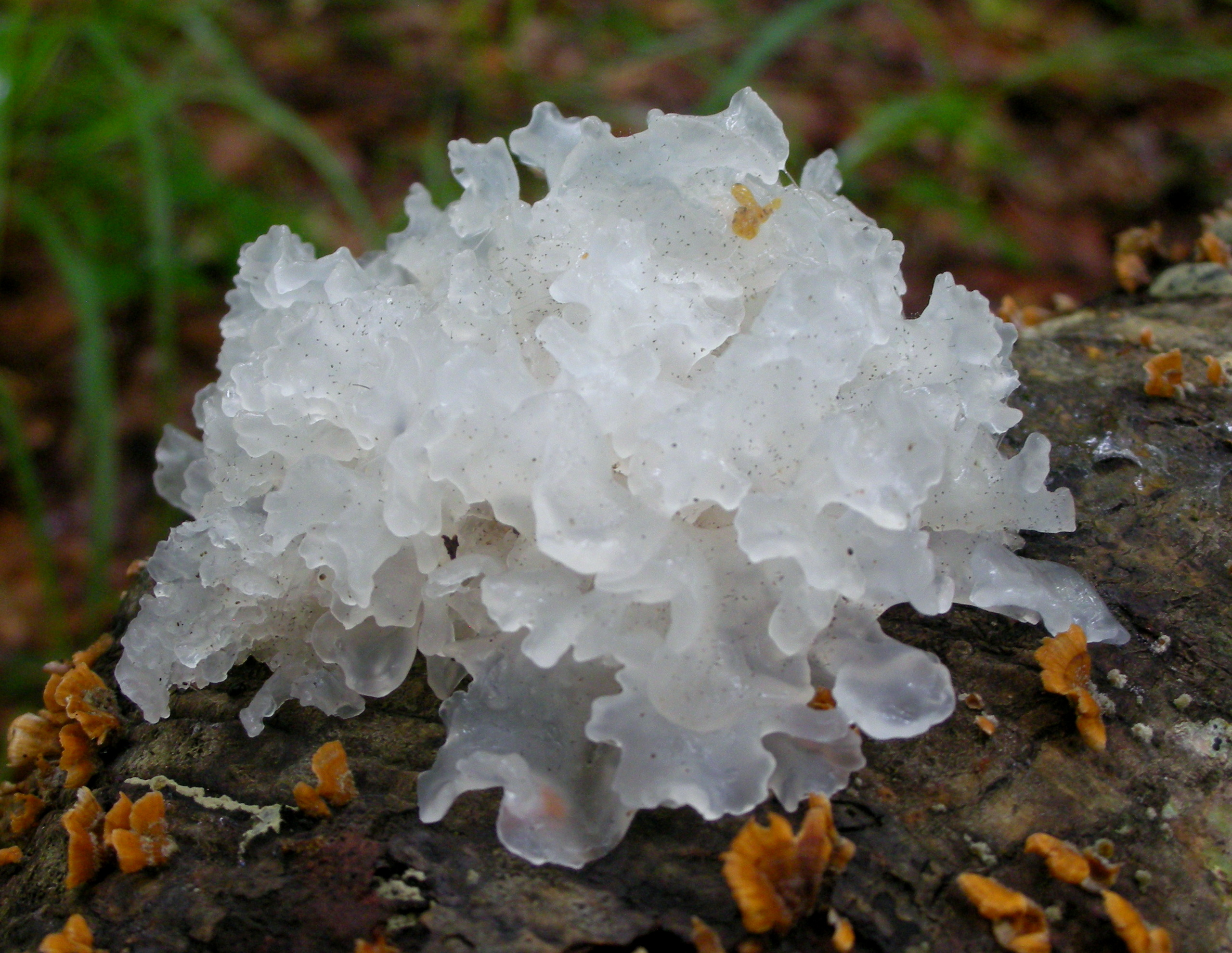

Scientific classification
- Kingdom: Fungi
- Division: Basidiomycota
- Class: Tremellomycetes
- Order: Tremellales
- Family: Tremellaceae
- Genus: Tremella
- Species: T. fuciformis

Binomial name
- Tremella fuciformis Berk. (1856)

Synonyms
- Nakaiomyces nipponicus Kobayasi (1939)

= Tremella fuciformis =

Species of edible fungus

Tremella fuciformis
- Mycological characteristics
- Smooth hymenium
- No distinct cap
- Hymenium attachment is not applicable
- Lacks a stipe
- Spore print is white
- Ecology is parasitic
- Edibility is choice

Tremella fuciformis is a species of fungus commonly known as snow fungus, snow ear, silver ear fungus, white ear fungus, white jelly mushroom, white fungus, or white cloud ears. It produces white, frond-like, gelatinous fruit bodies.

The species is widespread, especially in the tropics, where it can be found on the dead branches of broadleaf trees. It is a parasitic yeast, and grows as a slimy, mucus-like film until it encounters its preferred hosts, various species of Annulohypoxylon (or possibly Hypoxylon) fungi, whereupon it then invades, triggering the aggressive mycelial growth required to form the fruiting bodies.

This fungus is commercially cultivated and is one of the most popular fungi in the cuisine and medicine of China.

== Taxonomy ==
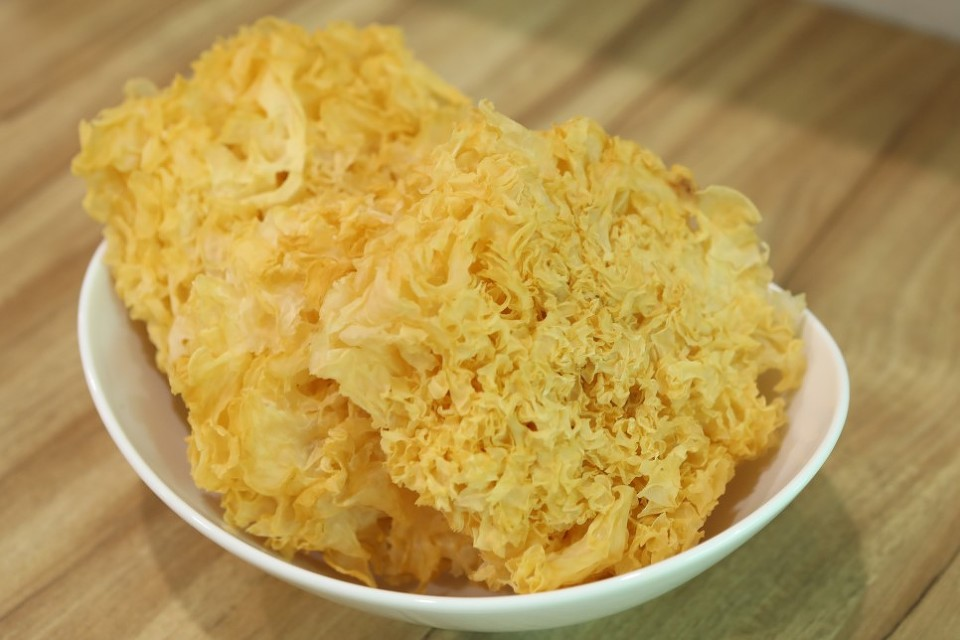
Eunibeoseot (Korean: 은이버섯, "silver ear mushroom")

Tremella fuciformis was first described in 1856 by English mycologist Miles Joseph Berkeley, based on collections made in Brazil by botanist and explorer Richard Spruce. In 1939, Japanese mycologist Yosio Kobayasi described Nakaiomyces nipponicus, a similar-looking fungus that differed by having scattered, dark spines on its surface. Later research, however, showed that the fruit bodies were those of Tremella fuciformis parasitized by an ascomycete, Ceratocystis epigloeum, that formed the dark spines. Nakaiomyces nipponicus is therefore a synonym of T. fuciformis.

In Mandarin Chinese, it is called yin'er (银耳; 銀耳; yín'ěr; 'silver ear'), xue'er (雪耳; xuě'ěr; 'snow ear'); or bai mu'er (白木耳; bái mù'ěr; 'white wood ear'), and in Japanese it is called shiro kikurage (シロキクラゲ; lit. "white tree jellyfish"). In Vietnam, it is called nấm tuyết or ngân nhĩ.

According to Paul Stamets, common names for T. fuciformis include: white jelly mushroom, yin er, white jelly fungus, white jelly leaf ("shirokikurage"), silver ear mushroom, snow mushroom, and chrysanthemum mushroom.

== Description ==
The fruit bodies are gelatinous, watery white, up to 7 centimetres (3 inches) across (larger in cultivated specimens), and composed of thin but erect, seaweed-like, branching fronds, often crisped at the edges. Microscopically, the hyphae are clamped and occur in a dense gelatinous matrix. Haustorial cells arise on the hyphae, producing filaments that attach to and penetrate the hyphae of the host. The basidia are tremelloid (ellipsoid, with oblique to vertical septa), 10–13 μm × 6.5–10 μm, sometimes stalked. The spores are ellipsoid, smooth, 5–8 μm × 4–6 μm, and germinate by hyphal tube or by yeast cells.

=== Similar species ===
Ductifera pululahuana is more opaque, as is Sebacina sparassoidea, which grows on the ground.

== Distribution and habitat ==
Tremella fuciformis is known to be a parasite of Hypoxylon, a genus of woodrot pathogens sometimes call "cramp balls". Many of these species were reassigned to a new genus, Annulohypoxylon, in 2005 including its preferred host, A. archeri, the species routinely used in commercial cultivation. Following its host, fruit bodies are typically found on dead, attached or recently fallen branches of broadleaf trees.

The species is mainly tropical and subtropical, but extends into temperate areas in Asia and North America. It is known in southern and eastern Asia, sub-Saharan Africa, North America (including Central America), South America, the Caribbean, the Pacific Islands, Australia, and New Zealand (where it may be another member of a species complex).

== Uses ==
A drink with Tremella fuciformis and bird's nest

Tremella fuciformis has been cultivated in China since at least the nineteenth century. Initially, suitable wooden poles were prepared and then treated in various ways in the aspiration that they would be colonized by the fungus. This haphazard method of cultivation was improved when poles were inoculated with spores or mycelium. Modern production only began, however, with the realization that both the Tremella and its host species needed to be inoculated into the substrate to ensure success. The "dual culture" method, now used commercially, employs a sawdust mix inoculated with both fungal species and kept under optimal conditions. The most popular species to pair with T. fuciformis is its preferred host, Annulohypoxylon archeri. Estimated production in China in 1997 was 130,000 tonnes. T. fuciformis is also cultivated in other East Asian countries, with some limited cultivation elsewhere.

In Chinese cuisine, T. fuciformis is traditionally used in sweet dishes. While having little taste, it is valued for its gelatinous texture as well as its supposed medicinal benefits. Most commonly, it is used to make a dessert soup called luk mei (六味) in Cantonese, often in combination with jujubes, dried longans, and other ingredients. It is also used as a component of a drink and as an ice cream. Since cultivation has made it less expensive, it is now additionally used in some savoury dishes. In Vietnamese cuisine, it is often used in Chè (Vietnamese pronunciation: [cɛ̂]), a Vietnamese term that refers to any traditional Vietnamese sweet beverage, dessert soup or pudding.

=== Cosmetics ===
T. fuciformis extract is used in women's beauty products from China, Korea, and Japan. The fungus reportedly increases moisture retention in the skin and prevents senile degradation of micro-blood vessels in the skin, reducing wrinkles and smoothing fine lines. Other anti-aging effects come from increasing the presence of superoxide dismutase in the brain and liver; it is an enzyme that acts as a potent antioxidant throughout the body, particularly in the skin. It can also be used for anti-inflammatory purposes. The medical benefits that come from this organism are vast, ranging from boosting immune health to lowering heart disease. T. fuciformis is also known in Chinese medicine for nourishing the lungs, and increasing the body's yin energy.
