= Penicillium melanoconidium =

Scientific classification
- Domain: Eukaryota
- Kingdom: Fungi
- Division: Ascomycota
- Class: Eurotiomycetes
- Order: Eurotiales
- Family: Aspergillaceae
- Genus: Penicillium
- Species: P. melanoconidium

Binomial name
- Penicillium melanoconidium Frisvad, J.; Samson, R.A. 2004

Type strain
- CBS 115506, IBT 3444, IMI 321503

Synonyms
- Penicillium aurantiogriseum var. melanoconidium

Species of fungus

Penicillium megasporum is a species in the genus Penicillium which produces xanthomegin, verrucosidin, roquefortine C and penitrem A. Penicillium megasporum occurs in grain
