= Verrucosidin =

Names
- Preferred IUPAC name 4-Methoxy-3,5-dimethyl-6-[(2R,3S)-2-methyl-3-{(2E,4E)-4-methyl-5-[(1S,2S,4R,5R)-2,4,5-trimethyl-3,6-dioxabicyclo[3.1.0]hexan-2-yl]penta-2,4-dien-2-yl}oxiran-2-yl]-2H-pyran-2-one

Identifiers
CAS Number	88389-71-3
3D model (JSmol)	Interactive image
ChEMBL	ChEMBL512656
ChemSpider	4941929
PubChem CID	6437365
CompTox Dashboard (EPA)	DTXSID701045464
- InChI: InChI=1S/C24H32O6/c1-12(11-22(6)21-23(7,30-21)16(5)28-22)10-13(2)18-24(8,29-18)19-14(3)17(26-9)15(4)20(25)27-19/h10-11,16,18,21H,1-9H3/b12-11+,13-10+/t16-,18+,21+,22+,23-,24-/m1/s1 Key: JSVLNARHSWZARV-FOOXNAEUSA-N
- SMILES: C[C@@H]1[C@@]2([C@@H](O2)[C@](O1)(C)/C=C(\C)/C=C(\C)/[C@H]3[C@](O3)(C)C4=C(C(=C(C(=O)O4)C)OC)C)C

Properties
Chemical formula	C_{24}H_{32}O_{6}
Molar mass	416.514 g·mol^{−1}
- Except where otherwise noted, data are given for materials in their standard state (at 25 °C [77 °F], 100 kPa). Infobox references

Verrucosidin is a toxic pyrone-type polyketide produced by Penicillium aurantiogriseum, Penicillium melanoconidium, and Penicillium polonicum.
