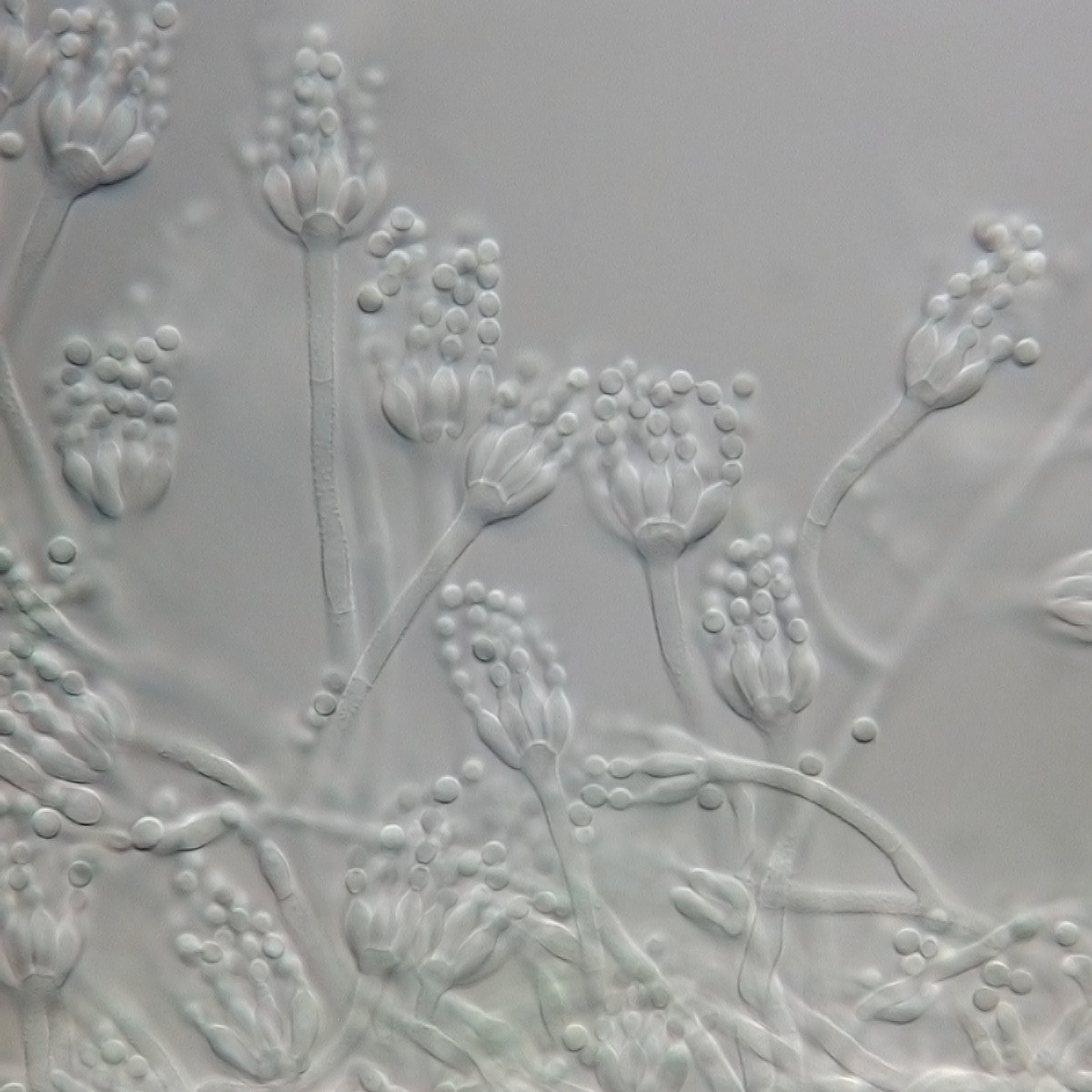

Scientific classification
- Kingdom: Fungi
- Division: Ascomycota
- Class: Eurotiomycetes
- Order: Eurotiales
- Family: Aspergillaceae
- Genus: Penicillium
- Species: P. spinulosum

Binomial name
- Penicillium spinulosum Thom, C. 1910

Type strain
- ATCC 10498, BCRC 32445, CBS 374.48, CCRC 32445, FRR 1750, IMI 024316, KCTC 6442, LSHB Ad29, MUCL 13910, MUCL 13911, NCTC 591, NRRL 1750, QM 7654, Thom 45, Wis. 143

Synonyms
- Penicillium aurantioviolaceum Biourge (1923); Penicillium baiicola Biourge (1923); Penicillium aurantioviolaceum Biourge (1923); Penicillium roseomaculatum Biourge (1923); Penicillium trzebinskii K.M. Zalessky (1927); Penicillium virididorsum Biourge (1923); Penicillium flavocinereum Biourge (1923); Penicillium baiicolum Biourge (1923); Penicillium mediocre Stapp & Bortels (1935); Penicillium mucosum Stapp & Bortels (1935); Penicillium roseoviride Stapp & Bortels (1935); Penicillium tannophagum Stapp & Bortels (1935); Penicillium tannophilum Stapp & Bortels (1935); Penicillium brunneoviride Szilvinyi (1941); Penicillium internascens Szilvinyi (1941); Penicillium trzebinskianum S. Abe (1956); Penicillium trzebinskii var. magnum Sakag. & S. Abe (1956); Penicillium odoratum M. Chr. & Backus (1961); Penicillium abeanum G. Sm. (1963); Penicillium palmense C. Ramírez & A.T. Martínez (1978); Penicillium palmensis C. Ramírez & A.T. Martínez (1978); Penicillium valentinum C. Ramírez & A.T. Martínez (1980); Penicillium toxicarium I. Miyake ex C. Ramírez (1982)

= Penicillium spinulosum =

Species of fungus

Penicillium spinulosum (spinulosus means with small spines in Latin) is a non-branched, fast-growing fungus with a swelling at the terminal of the stipe (vesiculate) in the genus Penicillium. P. spinulosum is able to grow and reproduce in environment with low temperature and low water availability, and is known to be acidotolerant. P. spinulosum is ubiquitously distributed, and can often be isolated from soil. Each individual strain of P. spinulosum differs from others in their colony morphology, including colony texture, amount of sporulation and roughness of conidia and conidiophores.

== History and taxonomy ==
Penicillium spinulosum was first discovered in 1910 by Dr. Charles Thom as a contaminant in another Penicillium culture sent to him by the German mycologist, Dr. Carl Wehmer. Classification and identification of the genus Penicillium were solely based on morphological traits before DNA sequencing was discovered. Key characteristics that are commonly involved in the grouping of P. spinulosm include vesiculate, rapid growth, spherical rough conidia and long conidiophores that projected from tangled mass of aerial hyphae. In 1949, Raper & Thom classified P. spinulosum as a member of the Penicillium section Monovertcillata due to its simple conidiospores branching pattern. In 1980, Pitt modified their classification by only including species with conidiospore stipes that are strictly or predominantly monovertcillate in the subgenus Aspergilloides, and P. spinulosm was placed under one of his newly introduced sections called Aspergilloides due to the presence of an apical swelling on the conidiophore resembling members of the genus, Aspergillus.

As classification based on morphology can be problematic, the taxonomy was repeatedly studied. P. spinulosm is phenotypically similar to P. glabrum and the related species P. purpurescens and P. montanense. Their categorization was studied by the international commission on Penicillium and Aspergillus in 1900, and the study indicated that the identification could be achieved based on width of the phialides, the conidial wall texture and the colony diameters, 4 out of the 15 strains, however, were still indistinguishable. The problem of phenotype-based identification was later solved by Peterson (2000) by using nuclear ribosomal RNA gene sequences.

== Growth and morphology ==
Penicillium spinulosum has round, spiny or irregularly rough-walled conidia produced in loose columns. The diameter of a conidium ranges from 3.0 to 3.5 μm. Penicillium spinulosum has thin-walled conidia with smooth or finely roughened texture terminating in a vesicle, the stipes of conidiospores generally range from 100 to 300 μm long, occasionally the length can be shorter than that. The conidiophores of P. spinulosum can arise from submerged or aerial hyphae. For conidiophores arising from aerial hyphae, the size of the stipes is shorter, e.g., 25–30 μm in length. The apex of conidiophores is inflated with simple (or monoverticilate) branching pattern. The conidiophores of P. spinulosum are terminated in 6 to 9 flask or bottom- shaped structure called phialides, these are not very abundant, and the length of individual phialide ranges from 2.5 to 3 μm. Subdivision of the genus Penicillium into subgenera and sections has traditionally been based on the branching pattern of the conidiophore. The conidiophores of P. spinulosum do not branch and is described as monoverticillate. However, modern phylogenetic studies of the genus Penicillium have revealed that these morphological patterns can arise independently, and thus do not reliably predict evolutionary relationships.

Growing colonies of P. spinulosum have broad white edges consist of white mycelium. Young colonies appears blue-green or grey-green and white to cream or faintly pink on the reverse. As the colonies mature, the colour becomes grey. The growth of P. spinulosum on czapek dox agar (CZ), malt extract agar (MEA) and Yeast Extract with Supplements (YES) occur rapidly. On CZ or MEA, colonies can spread broadly, reaching 20–30 mm in a week at 25 °C with light or moderate sporulation. The texture of the colony when grown on CZ is velutinous to floccose, which means that conidiophores can either arise like short velvet with little aerial mycelium or from a mass of tangled aerial hyphae.

== Physiology ==
Penicillium spinulosum is psychrophilic, meaning that it is able to grow and reproduce at low temperature, and xerophile as it can germinate in decreased water activity environment (down to 0.8 A_{w}) by producing compatible solutes using enzyme systems. In vitro, P. spinulosum does not grow at 37 °C. Jussila stated that no mycotoxin production by P. spinulosum have been reported, however, based on the work of Overy and colleagues, a mixed culture of P. glabrum and P. spinulosum was involved in chestnuts spoilage and mycotoxin production.

Colonies growth and germination of Penicillium spinulosum were extremely sensitive to several different disinfectants and preservatives, among them, potassium sorbate and Suma Bac imposed the strongest inhibition effect. Compare to the two other Penicillium species that isolated from baked products with P. spinulosm together (P. expansum and P. verruculosum), P. spinulosm shows better resistant to benzoic acid but more susceptible to sodium lactate during spore germination. P. spinulosm is able to survive in acidic environment although growth will be impeded. When grow in a chemically defined glucose or sucrose medium, can produce large amount of fat that is non-toxic to rats.

== Habitat and ecology ==
Penicillium spinulosum is found world-wide, and is most commonly isolated from soil. P. spinulosum has also been isolated from dextrin paste, distilled water containers, cotton yarn, walnut kernels, chrome tanned leather, vinyl wall covering, paracetamol tablet, diesel fuel and emulsion paint treated with chromate. P. spinulosumis highly resistant to heavy metals, tannins and acids, and can be isolated from substrata contaminated by those materials.

== Pathogenicity ==
The pathogenicity of P. spinulosum remains controversial. In vitro, spores produced by P. spinulosum were reported to cause toxic and inflammatory responses in mouse macrophages. However, according to an experiment done by Jussila, this fungus can induce inflammation due to the production of moderate pro-inflammatory cytokines. The response of which is dose- and time- dependent and not cytotoxic even at high spore dose, so it is not likely to cause acute respiratory inflammations. Respiratory tract infection due to P. spinulosm was reported by Delore et al. in 1955, but the isolate they described had smooth conidia and restricted growth; by contrast, P. spinulosm typically has conidia with small spines and its growth is rapid. P. spinulosm is thought to be unlikely to cause human infection due to its inability to grow at 37 °C.
