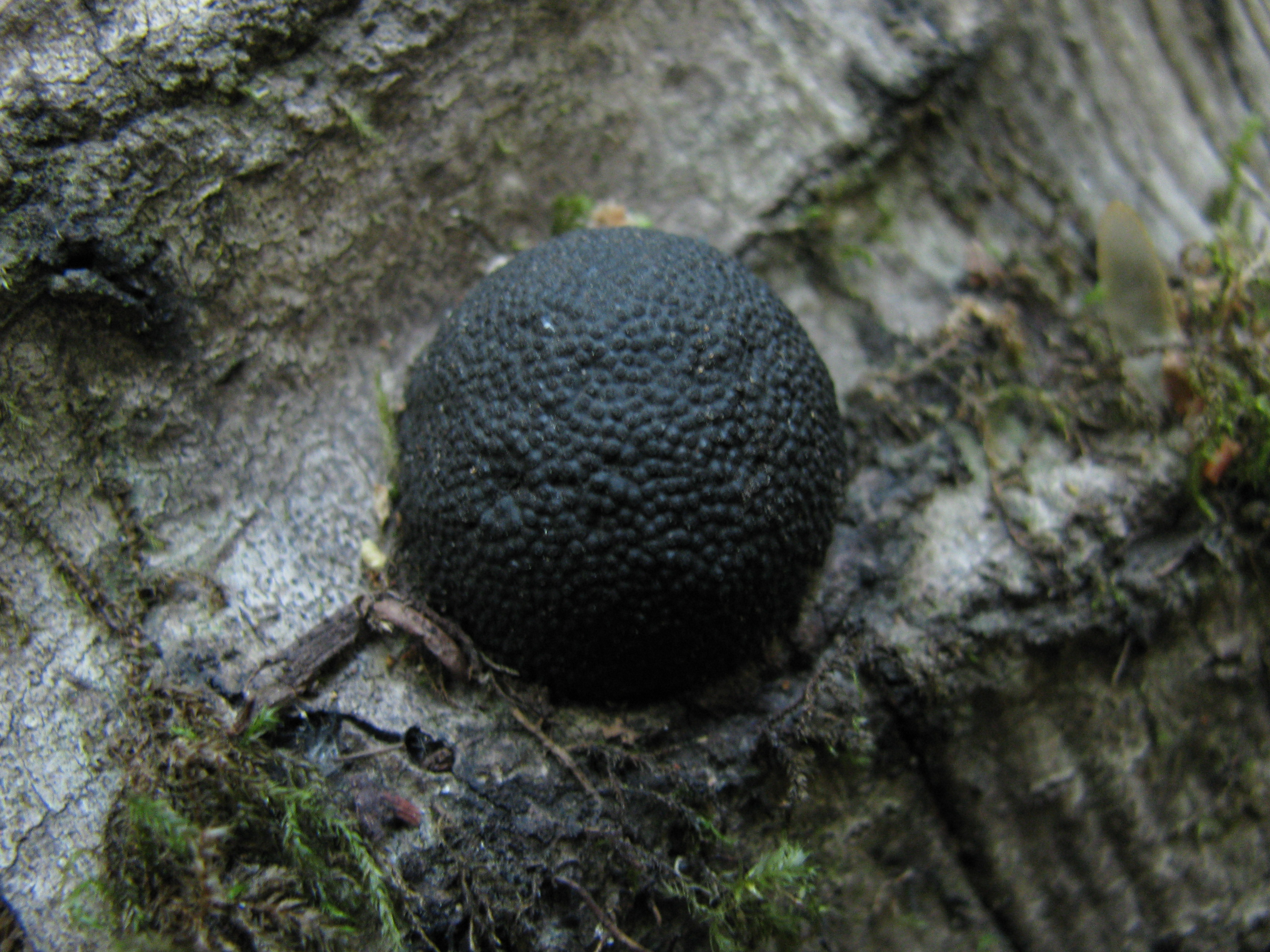
- Annulohypoxylon thouarsianum

Scientific classification
- Kingdom: Fungi
- Division: Ascomycota
- Class: Sordariomycetes
- Order: Xylariales
- Family: Xylariaceae
- Genus: Annulohypoxylon; Y.-M.Ju, J.D.Rogers & H.-M.Hsieh (2005)

Type species
- Annulohypoxylon truncatum (Schwein.) Y.M.Ju (2005)

= Annulohypoxylon =

Genus of fungi

Annulohypoxylon, sometimes called cramp balls, is a genus of fungi in the family Xylariaceae. The 27 species in the genus have a collectively widespread distribution.

The genus Annulohypoxylon was created in 2005 and contains species formerly placed in the closely related genus Hypoxylon (it is equivalent to Hypoxylon section Annulata sensu). Fossils of Annulohypoxylon have been found in 12 million year old rocks from central England.

== Use in the cultivation of Tremella fuciformis ==
Species in the genus Annulohypoxylon, especially Annulohypoxylon archeri, are commonly used in the cultivation of Tremella fuciformis, one of the foremost medicinal and culinary fungi of China and Taiwan.

Tremella fuciformis is a parasitic yeast that does not form an edible fruit body without parasitizing another fungus. The species Annulohypoxylon archeri is its preferred host, so cultivators usually pair cultures of Tremella fuciformis with this species, or others in the former genus Hypoxylon (now split into two genera – Hypoxylon and Annulohypoxylon).

== Species ==
As of October 2024, Species Fungorum (in the Catalogue of Life) accept 70 species of Annulohypoxylon:

- Annulohypoxylon albidiscum Jin F.Zhang, Jian K.Liu, K.D.Hyde & Zuo Y.Liu (2016)
- Annulohypoxylon annulatum (Schwein.) Y.M.Ju, J.D.Rogers & H.M.Hsieh (2005)
- Annulohypoxylon apiahynum (Speg.) Hladki & A.I.Romero (2009)
- Annulohypoxylon archeri (Berk.) Y.M.Ju, J.D.Rogers & H.M.Hsieh (2005)
- Annulohypoxylon areolatum (Sacc.) Sir & Kuhnert (2016)
- Annulohypoxylon atroroseum (J.D.Rogers) Y.M.Ju, J.D.Rogers & H.M.Hsieh (2005)
- Annulohypoxylon bahnphadengense J.Fourn. & M.Stadler (2010)
- Annulohypoxylon bawanglingense Wei Li bis & L.Guo (2019)
- Annulohypoxylon bogoriense (Höhn.) Lar.N.Vassiljeva, S.L.Stephenson & K.D.Hyde (2016)
- Annulohypoxylon bovei (Speg.) Y.M.Ju, J.D.Rogers & H.M.Hsieh (2005)
- Annulohypoxylon caravellense J.Fourn. & Lechat (2016)
- Annulohypoxylon chiangmaiense Lar.N.Vassiljeva, S.L.Stephenson & K.D.Hyde (2016)
- Annulohypoxylon crowfoothodgkiniae Y.P.Tan, Bishop-Hurley, Bransgr. & R.G.Shivas (2022)
- Annulohypoxylon derelictum Lar.N.Vassiljeva, S.L.Stephenson & K.D.Hyde (2016)
- Annulohypoxylon diaoluoshanense Wei Li bis & L.Guo (2019)
- Annulohypoxylon dipterocarpi Lar.N.Vassiljeva, S.L.Stephenson & K.D.Hyde (2016)
- Annulohypoxylon discophorum (Penz. & Sacc.) Y.M.Ju, J.D.Rogers & H.M.Hsieh (2005)
- Annulohypoxylon duckei K.S.Cruz & M.A.Jesus (2020)
- Annulohypoxylon elevatidiscum (Y.M.Ju, J.D.Rogers & H.M.Hsieh) Y.M.Ju, J.D.Rogers & H.M.Hsieh (2005)
- Annulohypoxylon fulvum J.Fourn. & Lechat (2016)
- Annulohypoxylon guangxiense Wei Li bis & L.Guo (2019)
- Annulohypoxylon hemicarpum Jad.Pereira, J.D.Rogers & J.L.Bezerra (2010)
- Annulohypoxylon hians (Berk. & Cooke) Y.M.Ju, J.D.Rogers & H.M.Hsieh (2005)
- Annulohypoxylon kwolekiae Y.P.Tan & R.G.Shivas (2022)
- Annulohypoxylon lancangensis R.F.Xu & S.Tibpromma (2024)
- Annulohypoxylon leucadendri Marinc., M.J.Wingf. & Crous (2008)
- Annulohypoxylon macrodiscum Jad.Pereira, J.D.Rogers & J.L.Bezerra (2010)
- Annulohypoxylon macrosporum (Y.M.Ju & J.D.Rogers) Sir & Kuhnert (2016)
- Annulohypoxylon maesaeense Lar.N.Vassiljeva, S.L.Stephenson & K.D.Hyde (2016)
- Annulohypoxylon maeteangense J.Fourn. & M.Stadler (2010)
- Annulohypoxylon massivum Sir & Kuhnert (2016)
- Annulohypoxylon michelianum (Ces. & De Not.) Y.M.Ju, J.D.Rogers & H.M.Hsieh (2005)
- Annulohypoxylon microbovei Lar.N.Vassiljeva, S.L.Stephenson & K.D.Hyde (2016)
- Annulohypoxylon microcarpum (Penz. & Sacc.) Y.M.Ju, J.D.Rogers & H.M.Hsieh (2005)
- Annulohypoxylon microdiscum (Y.M.Ju & J.D.Rogers) Sir & Kuhnert (2016)
- Annulohypoxylon moniliforme X.Y.Ma & J.C.Kang (2022)
- Annulohypoxylon moriforme (Henn.) Y.M.Ju, J.D.Rogers & H.M.Hsieh (2005)
- Annulohypoxylon morisuspectum Lar.N.Vassiljeva, S.L.Stephenson & K.D.Hyde (2016)
- Annulohypoxylon multiforme (Fr.) Y.M.Ju, J.D.Rogers & H.M.Hsieh (2005)
- Annulohypoxylon neglectum Lar.N.Vassiljeva, S.L.Stephenson & K.D.Hyde (2016)
- Annulohypoxylon nitens (Ces.) Y.M.Ju, J.D.Rogers & H.M.Hsieh (2005)
- Annulohypoxylon nouraguense J.Fourn. & Lechat (2016)
- Annulohypoxylon orientale Lar.N.Vassiljeva & S.L.Stephenson (2014)
- Annulohypoxylon palmicola Jian K.Liu & K.D.Hyde (2015)
- Annulohypoxylon paratruncatum Lar.N.Vassiljeva, S.L.Stephenson & K.D.Hyde (2016)
- Annulohypoxylon parvodiscum K.S.Cruz & Cortez (2016)
- Annulohypoxylon planodiscum Lar.N.Vassiljeva, S.L.Stephenson & K.D.Hyde (2016)
- Annulohypoxylon pouceanum (Berk. & Cooke) Y.M.Ju, J.D.Rogers & H.M.Hsieh (2005)
- Annulohypoxylon pseudonitens Lar.N.Vassiljeva, S.L.Stephenson & K.D.Hyde (2016)
- Annulohypoxylon pseudostipitatum (Y.M.Ju & J.D.Rogers) Y.M.Ju, J.D.Rogers & H.M.Hsieh (2005)
- Annulohypoxylon purpureonitens (Y.M.Ju & J.D.Rogers) Y.M.Ju, J.D.Rogers & H.M.Hsieh (2005)
- Annulohypoxylon purpureopigmentum Jad.Pereira, J.D.Rogers & J.L.Bezerra (2010)
- Annulohypoxylon pyriforme (Y.M.Ju & J.D.Rogers) Y.M.Ju, J.D.Rogers & H.M.Hsieh (2005)
- Annulohypoxylon ramulorum J.Fourn. & Lechat (2016)
- Annulohypoxylon sichuanense Wei Li bis & L.Guo (2019)
- Annulohypoxylon sordidum Lar.N.Vassiljeva, S.L.Stephenson & K.D.Hyde (2016)
- Annulohypoxylon splendens J.Fourn. & Lechat (2016)
- Annulohypoxylon spougei Suwannasai, M.P.Martín, Phosri & Whalley (2020)
- Annulohypoxylon squamulosum (Y.M.Ju, J.D.Rogers & H.M.Hsieh) Y.M.Ju, J.D.Rogers & H.M.Hsieh (2005)
- Annulohypoxylon stygium (Lév.) Y.M.Ju, J.D.Rogers & H.M.Hsieh (2005)
- Annulohypoxylon subeffusum (Speg.) Hladki & A.I.Romero (2009)
- Annulohypoxylon subnitens J.Fourn. & Lechat (2016)
- Annulohypoxylon substygium Sir & Kuhnert (2016)
- Annulohypoxylon thailandicum Daranag. & K.D.Hyde (2015)
- Annulohypoxylon thouarsianum (Lév.) Y.M.Ju, J.D.Rogers & H.M.Hsieh (2005)
- Annulohypoxylon truncatum (Starbäck) Y.M.Ju, J.D.Rogers & H.M.Hsieh (2005)
- Annulohypoxylon urceolatum (Rehm) Y.M.Ju, J.D.Rogers & H.M.Hsieh (2005)
- Annulohypoxylon violaceopigmentum Sir & Kuhnert (2016)
- Annulohypoxylon viridistratum Sir & Kuhnert (2016)
- Annulohypoxylon yungense Sir, Kuhnert, Hladki & A.I.Romero (2016)

== Gallery ==
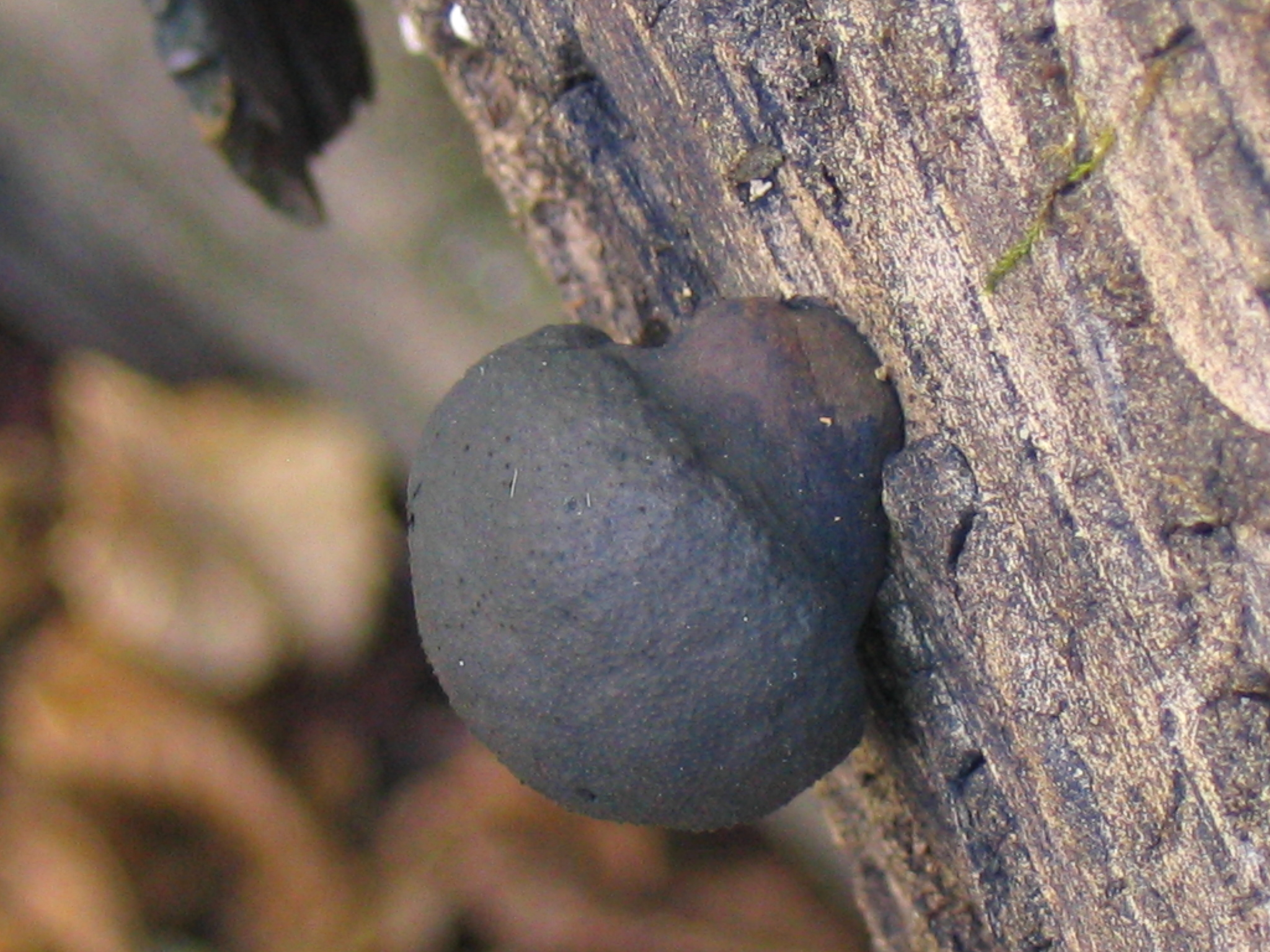
Annulohypoxylon thouarsianum

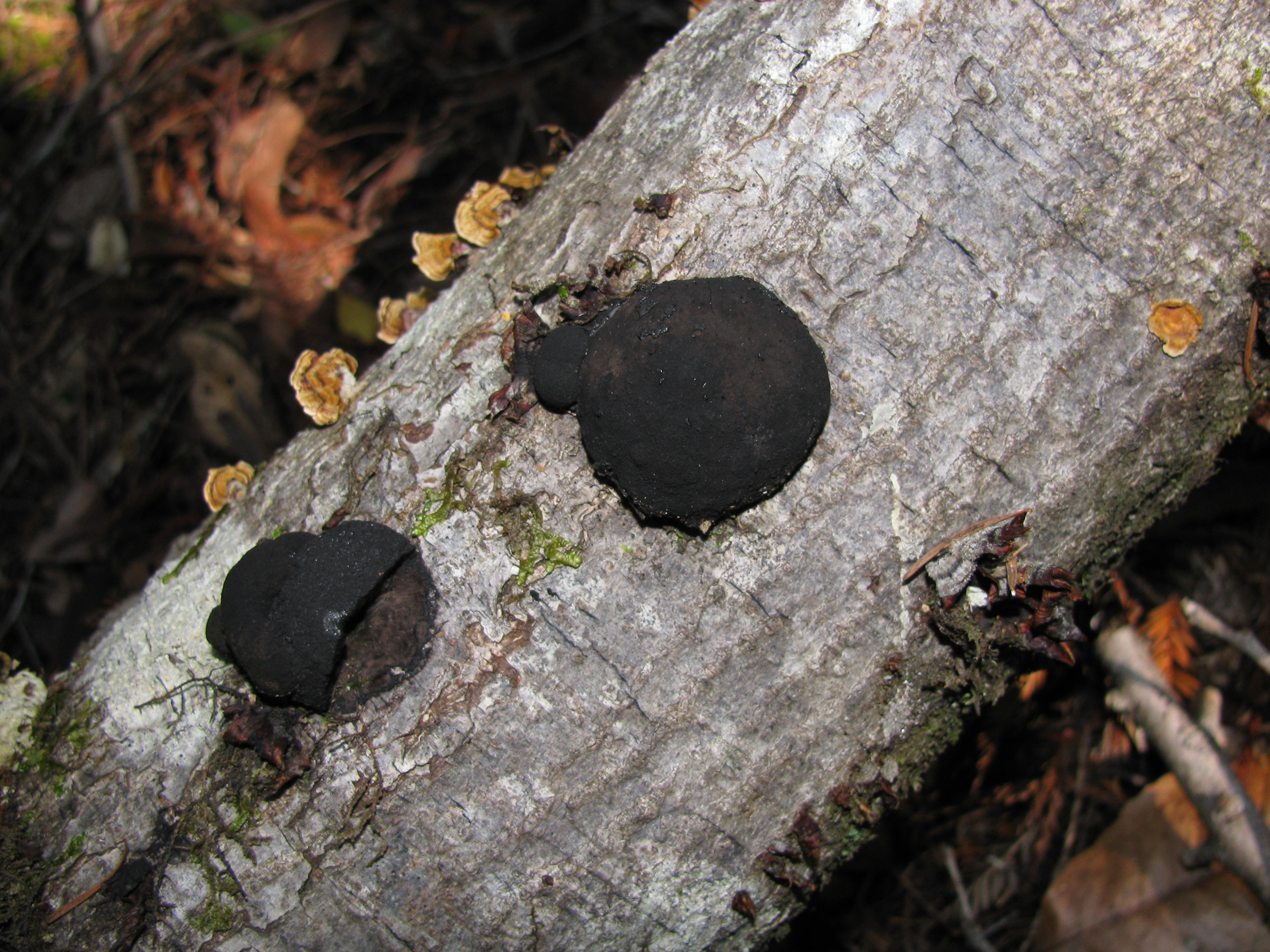
Annulohypoxylon thouarsianum

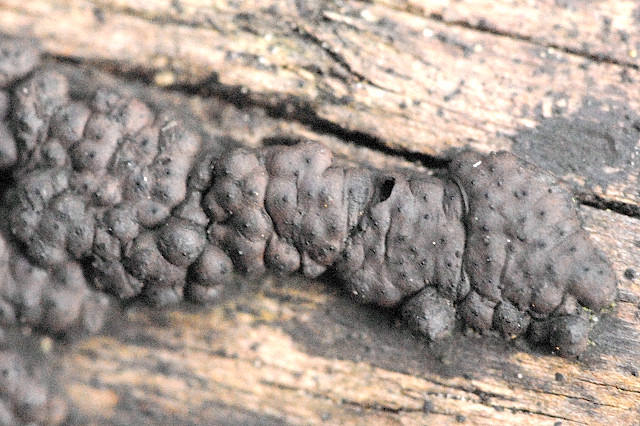
Annulohypoxylon cohaerens

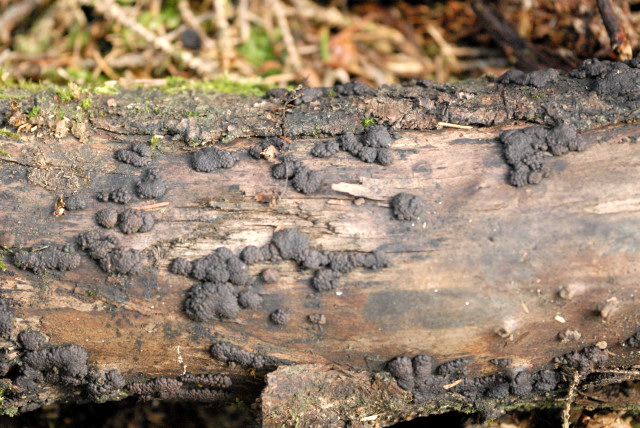
Annulohypoxylon cohaerens

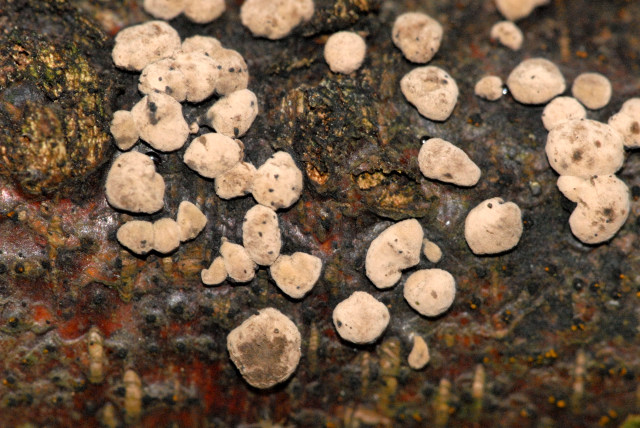
Annulohypoxylon cohaerens

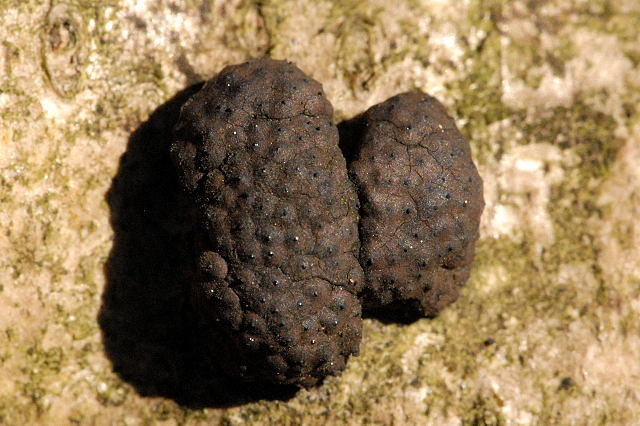
Annulohypoxylon multiforme

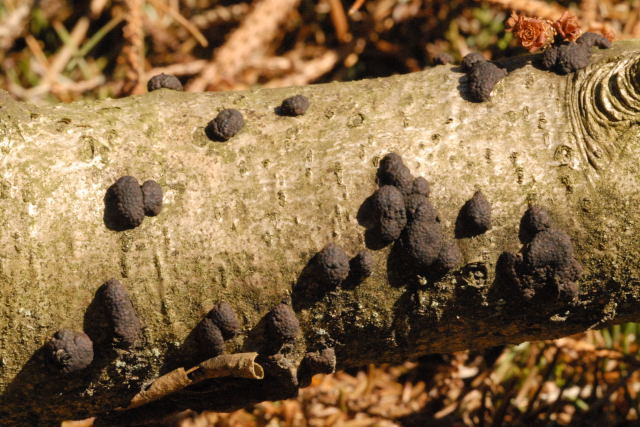
Annulohypoxylon multiforme

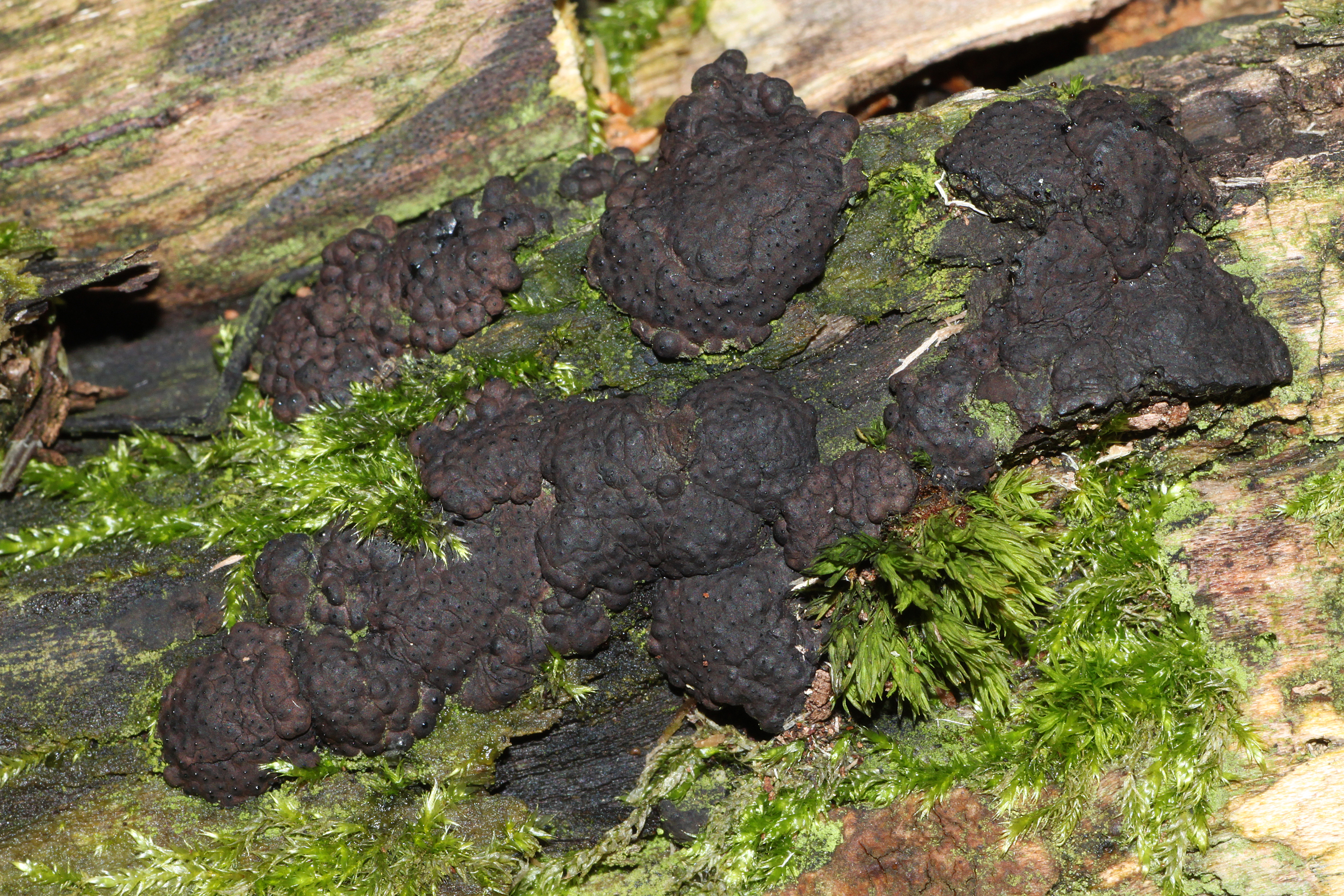
Annulohypoxylon multiforme

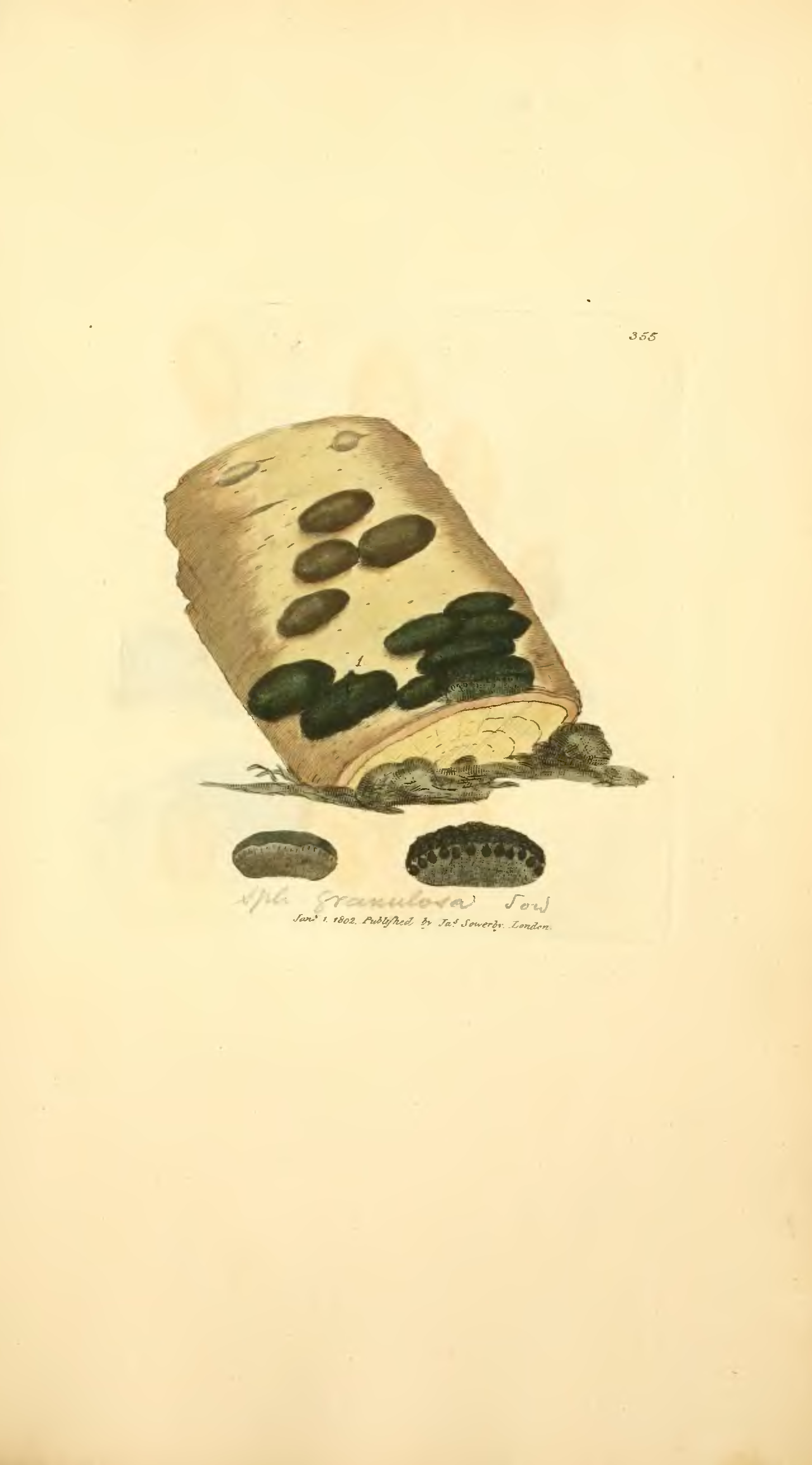
Annulohypoxylon multiforme by James Sowerby (1803)
