= Dehydroaltenusin =

Names
- IUPAC name 3,7-Dihydroxy-9-methoxy-4a-methylbenzo[c]chromene-2,6-dione

Identifiers
CAS Number	34279-44-2
3D model (JSmol)	Interactive image
ChEMBL	ChEMBL594151
ChemSpider	8054697
PubChem CID	9879020
CompTox Dashboard (EPA)	DTXSID401045491
- InChI: InChI=1S/C15H12O6/c1-15-6-12(18)10(16)5-9(15)8-3-7(20-2)4-11(17)13(8)14(19)21-15/h3-6,17-18H,1-2H3 Key: YWYZLBQRCUAQAV-UHFFFAOYSA-N; InChI=1/C15H12O6/c1-15-6-12(18)10(16)5-9(15)8-3-7(20-2)4-11(17)13(8)14(19)21-15/h3-6,17-18H,1-2H3 Key: YWYZLBQRCUAQAV-UHFFFAOYAK
- SMILES: CC12C=C(C(=O)C=C1C3=CC(=CC(=C3C(=O)O2)O)OC)O

Properties
Chemical formula	C_{15}H_{12}O_{6}
Molar mass	288.255 g·mol^{−1}
- Except where otherwise noted, data are given for materials in their standard state (at 25 °C [77 °F], 100 kPa). Infobox references

Dehydroaltenusin is an inhibitor of mammalian DNA polymerase α. It has been isolated from the fungus Alternaria tenuis.
