= Penicillium decumbens =

Scientific classification
- Kingdom: Fungi
- Division: Ascomycota
- Class: Eurotiomycetes
- Order: Eurotiales
- Family: Aspergillaceae
- Genus: Penicillium
- Species: P. decumbens

Binomial name
- Penicillium decumbens Thom, C. 1910

Type strain
- CBS 230.81

Synonyms
- Penicillium indicum

Species of fungus

Penicillium decumbens is an anamorph species of the genus of Penicillium which occurs widespread in nature, mainly in subtropical and tropical soil but it also occurs in food. Analysis have shown that Penicillium decumbens has antibiotic activity Penicillium decumbens produces the cyclopentenone cyclopenicillone

== See also ==
- List of Penicillium species
