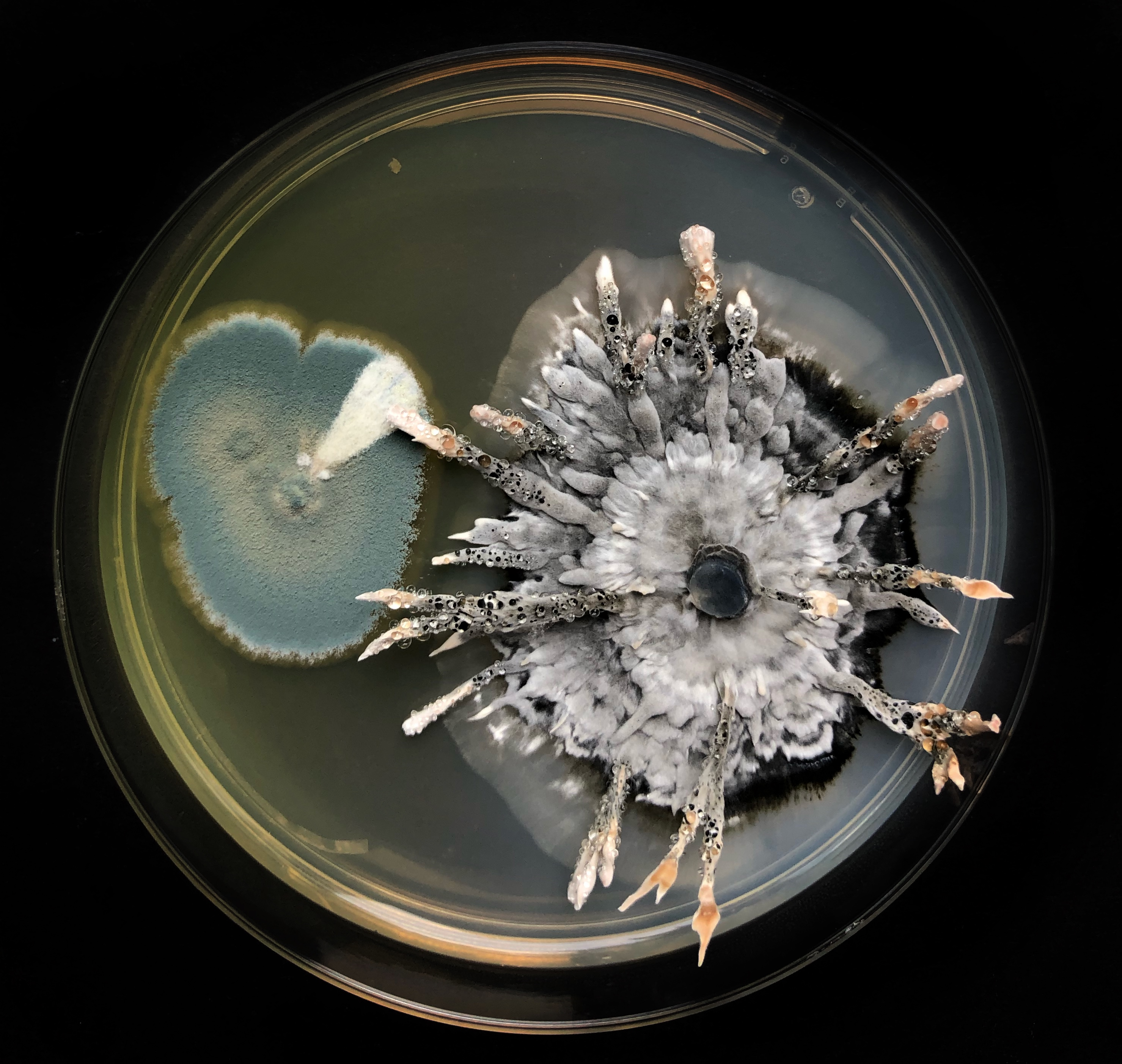
- Xylaria against Penicillium

Scientific classification
- Kingdom: Fungi
- Division: Ascomycota
- Class: Eurotiomycetes
- Order: Eurotiales
- Family: Aspergillaceae
- Genus: Penicillium
- Species: P. polonicum

Binomial name
- Penicillium polonicum Zalessky, K.M. 1927

Type strain
- Biourge 276, CBS 222.28, IBT 12821, IMI 291194, MUCL 29204, NRRL 995, QM 7596, Thom 5010.33

Synonyms
- Penicillium aurantiogriseum var. polonicum

= Penicillium polonicum =

Species of fungus

Penicillium polonicum is a species of fungus in the genus Penicillium which produces penicillic acid, verucosidin, patulin, anacine, 3-methoxyviridicatin and glycopeptides. Penicillium polonicum can spoil cereals, peanuts, onions, dried meats, citrus fruits
