= Medicinal uses of fungi =

Fungi that can be used to develop medications

Medicinal fungi are fungi that contain metabolites or can be induced to produce metabolites through biotechnology to develop prescription drugs. Compounds successfully developed into drugs or under research include those treating infection with amoeba, bacteria, fungus, virus, inhibitors of cholesterol and ergosterol synthesis, and psychotropics.

Some species are included in traditional medicine, but lack evidence as to any health benefit. Similarly, mushroom dietary supplements, commonly made from powdered or extracted fruit bodies or mycelium, are marketed for various health benefits but lack sufficient scientific evidence for their safety or effectiveness, and their quality can vary due to inconsistent processing and labeling.

== History ==
In Ancient Egypt moldy bread was applied to wound infection.

Inonotus obliquus was used in folk medicine tumor treatment in Russia and Northern Europe during the 16th century.

Hallucinogenic mushrooms include Amanita muscaria, the fly agaric and "magic mushrooms", which contain psilocybin and psilocin.

The ability to identify beneficial properties and then extract the active ingredient from mold started with the discovery of penicillin from Penicillium rubens by Alexander Fleming, September 1928. Scientific investigation into pharmacological applications of mushrooms began during the 1960s.

== Nutritional supplements ==
The photochemistry of vitamin D_{2} biosynthesis

Mushroom dietary supplements, commonly made from powdered or extracted fruiting bodies or mycelium, are marketed for various health benefits but lack sufficient scientific evidence for safety or effectiveness, and quality can vary due to inconsistent processing and labeling.

Lysine is produced from Saccharomyces cerevisiae.

Riboflavin is produced from Candida famata and Ashbya gossypii.

Pichia fermentans is a source of astaxanthin, β-carotene, and lutein.

Fungi are a source of ergosterol which can be converted to vitamin D_{2} upon exposure to ultraviolet light.

== Drug development ==
=== Amebicides ===
Fumagillin was isolated in 1949 from Aspergillus fumigatus.

Transgenic yeasts are used to produce artemisinin.

=== Antibacterial agents (antibiotics) ===
Pleuromutilin was discovered as an antibiotic in 1951. It is derived from Omphalina mutila (formerly Pleurotus mutilus) and Clitopilus passeckerianus (formerly Pleurotus passeckerianus). Cephalosporins were first sold in 1964, the mold which yielded cephalosporin C was first discovered by Giuseppe Brotzu in July 1945. Citromycin from Penicillium was discovered in 1969. Oudemansin A from Oudemansiella mucida was first described in 1979. Plectasin from Pseudoplectania nigrella was discovered in 2005.

=== Cancer ===
As of 2022, there is not enough scientific evidence to indicate that any mushroom or mushroom extract is effective for reducing the risk of cancer.

=== Cholesterol biosynthesis inhibitors ===
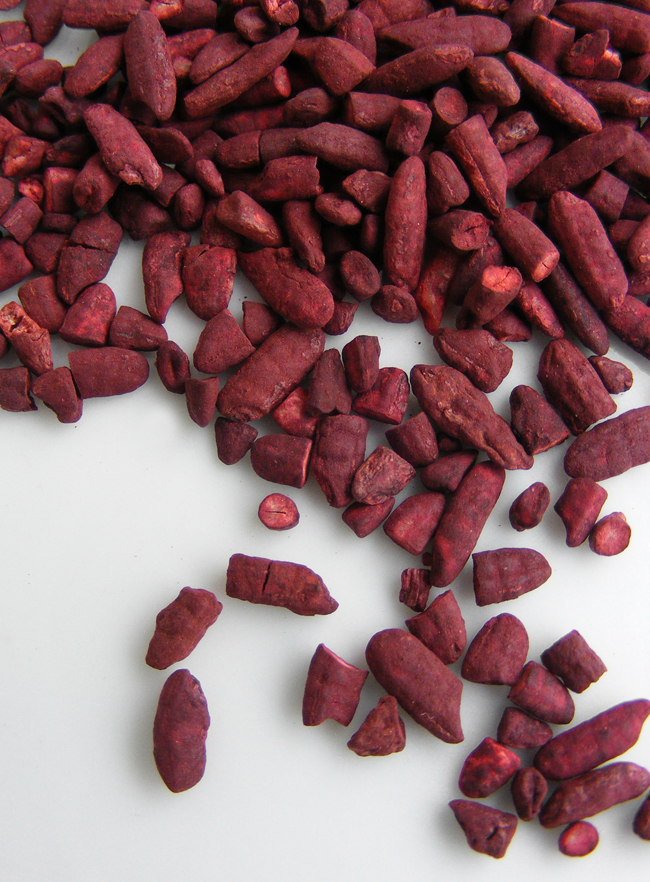
The red yeast rice fungus, Monascus purpureus, can synthesize three statins.

Statins are an important class of cholesterol-lowering drugs; the first generation of statins were derived from fungi. Lovastatin, the first commercial statin, was extracted from a fermentation broth of Aspergillus terreus. Industrial production is now capable of producing 70 mg lovastatin per kilogram of substrate.

=== Diabetes ===
Transgenic yeasts are used to produce insulin analogs.

Moniliella pollinis is used industrially to produce erythritol.

=== Antifungals ===
Griseofulvin is derived from a number of Penicillium species; caspofungin is derived from Glarea lozoyensis.

=== Psychotropic effects ===
The history of bread-making records deadly ergotism caused by ergot, most commonly Claviceps purpurea, a parasite of cereal crops. Psychoactive ergot alkaloid drugs have subsequently been extracted from or synthesised starting from ergot; these include ergotamine, dihydroergotamine, ergometrine, ergocristine, ergocryptine, ergocornine, methysergide, bromocriptine, cabergoline, and pergolide.

=== Antivirals ===
Brefeldin A was first isolated from Penicillium decumbens in 1958 at Purdue University.

== See also ==
- List of unproven and disproven cancer treatments: Plant and fungus
- Psilocybin decriminalization in the United States
- Psilocybin therapy
