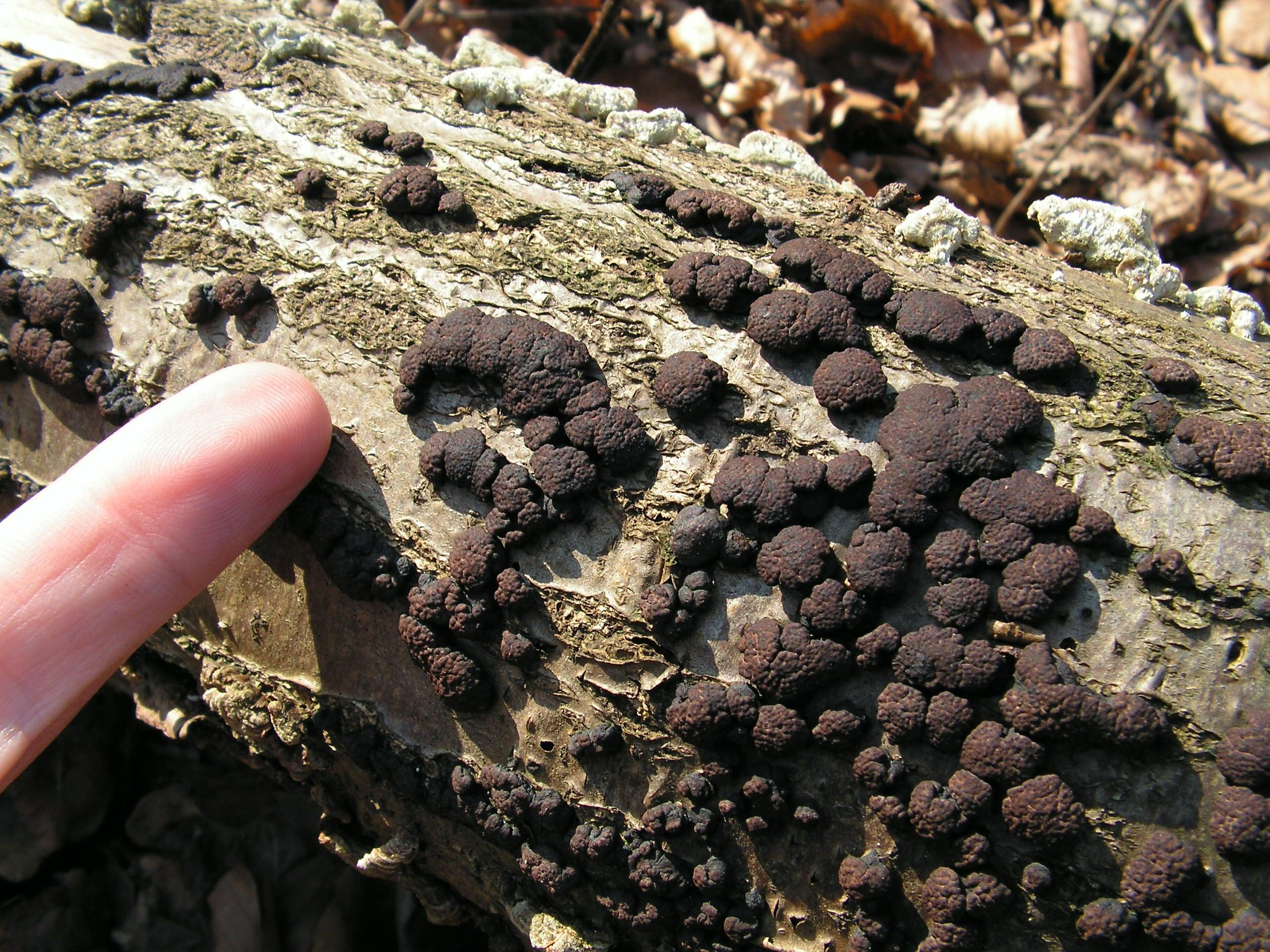

Scientific classification
- Domain: Eukaryota
- Kingdom: Fungi
- Division: Ascomycota
- Class: Sordariomycetes
- Order: Xylariales
- Family: Hypoxylaceae
- Genus: Hypoxylon; Bull.

Type species
- Hypoxylon coccineum Bull.

Species
- Species include: Hypoxylon fragiforme; Hypoxylon tinctor; Hypoxylon chrysalidosporum

= Hypoxylon =

Genus of fungi

Hypoxylon is a genus of ascomycetes commonly found on dead wood, and usually one of the earliest species to colonise dead wood. A common European species is Hypoxylon fragiforme which is particularly common on dead trunks of beech.

Based on morphological studies and gene sequence analyses, 27 species formerly assigned to Hypoxylon sect. Annulata were reassigned to a new genus called Annulohypoxylon in 2005.

Research in Iran has shown the potential of some species of Hypoxylon in producing chemicals that are antagonistic against the disease ash dieback.

== Use in the cultivation of Tremella fuciformis ==
Some species in the genus Hypoxylon may be used in the cultivation of Tremella fuciformis, one of the foremost medicinal and culinary fungi of China and Taiwan.

Tremella fuciformis is a parasitic yeast that does not form an edible fruitbody without parasitizing another fungus. Its preferred host, formerly known as Hypoxylon archeri, was moved to the closely related genus Annulohypoxylon and is now known as Annulohypoxylon archeri. Cultivators usually pair cultures of Tremella fuciformis with this species, but mushroom cultivation books written before the new genus was created suggest other Hypoxylon species may be used.

== Gallery ==
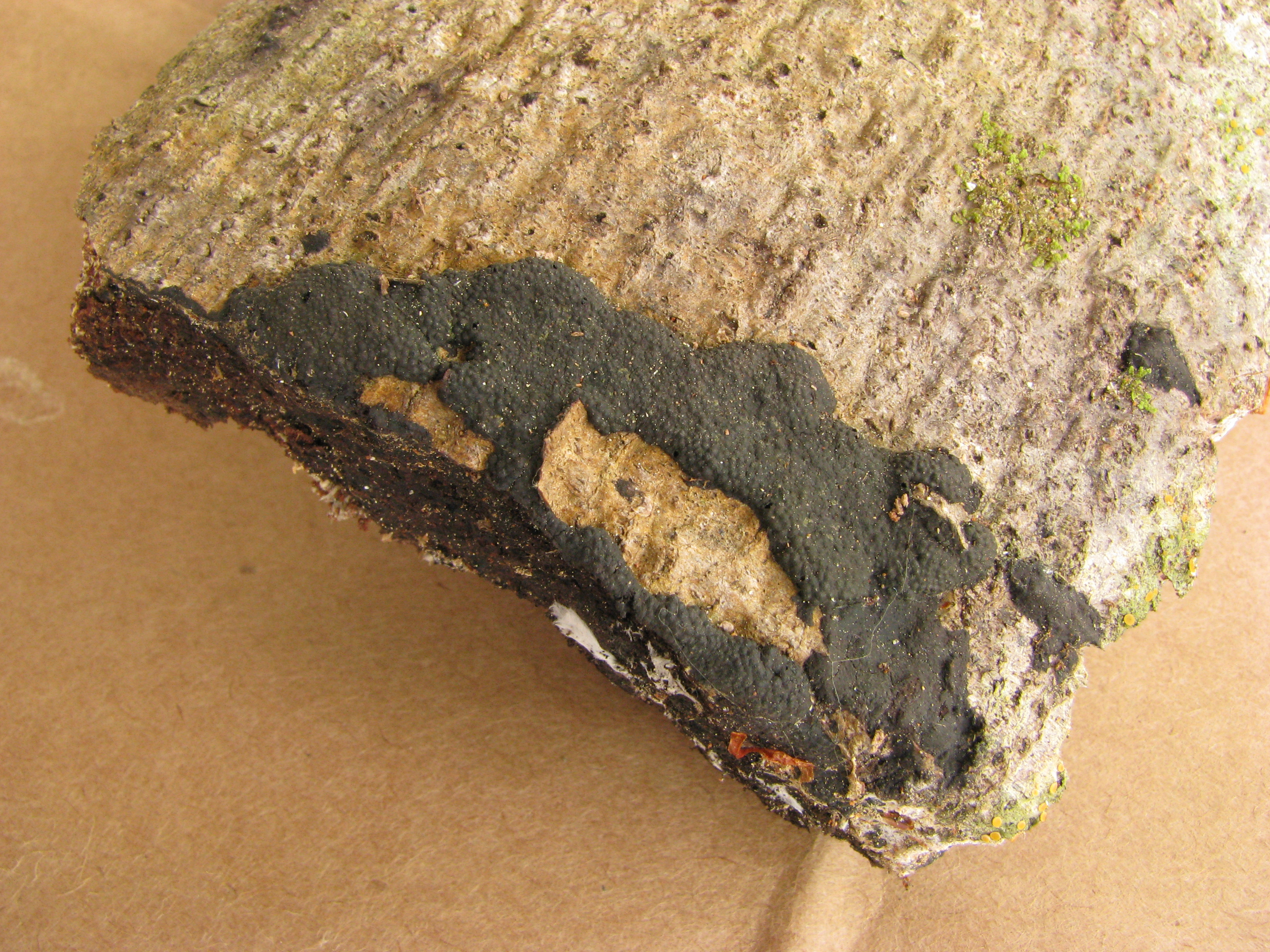
Hypoxylon sp.

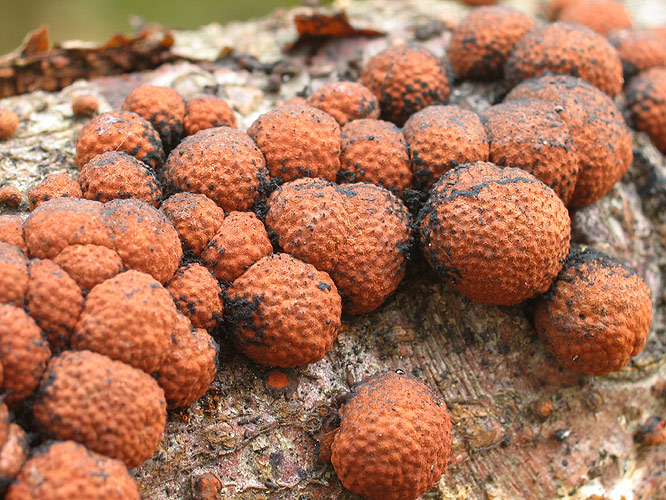
Hypoxylon fragiforme

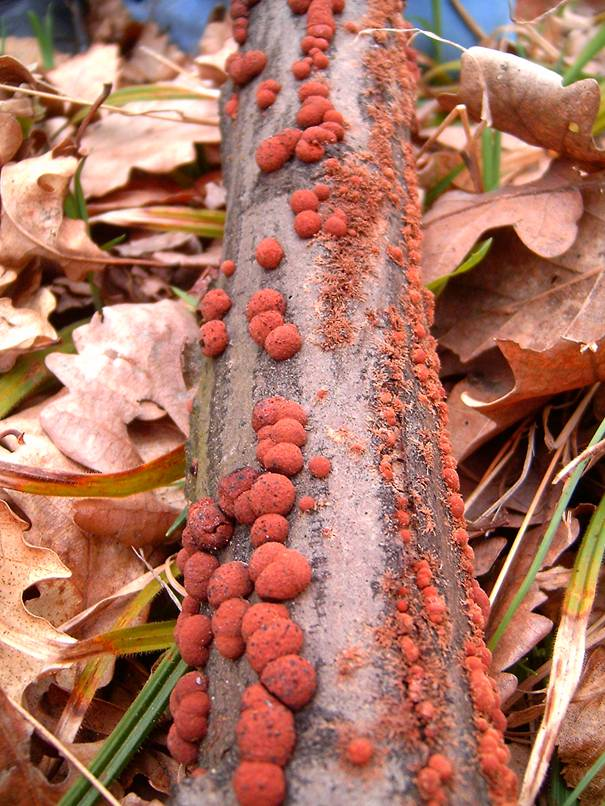
Hypoxylon fragiforme

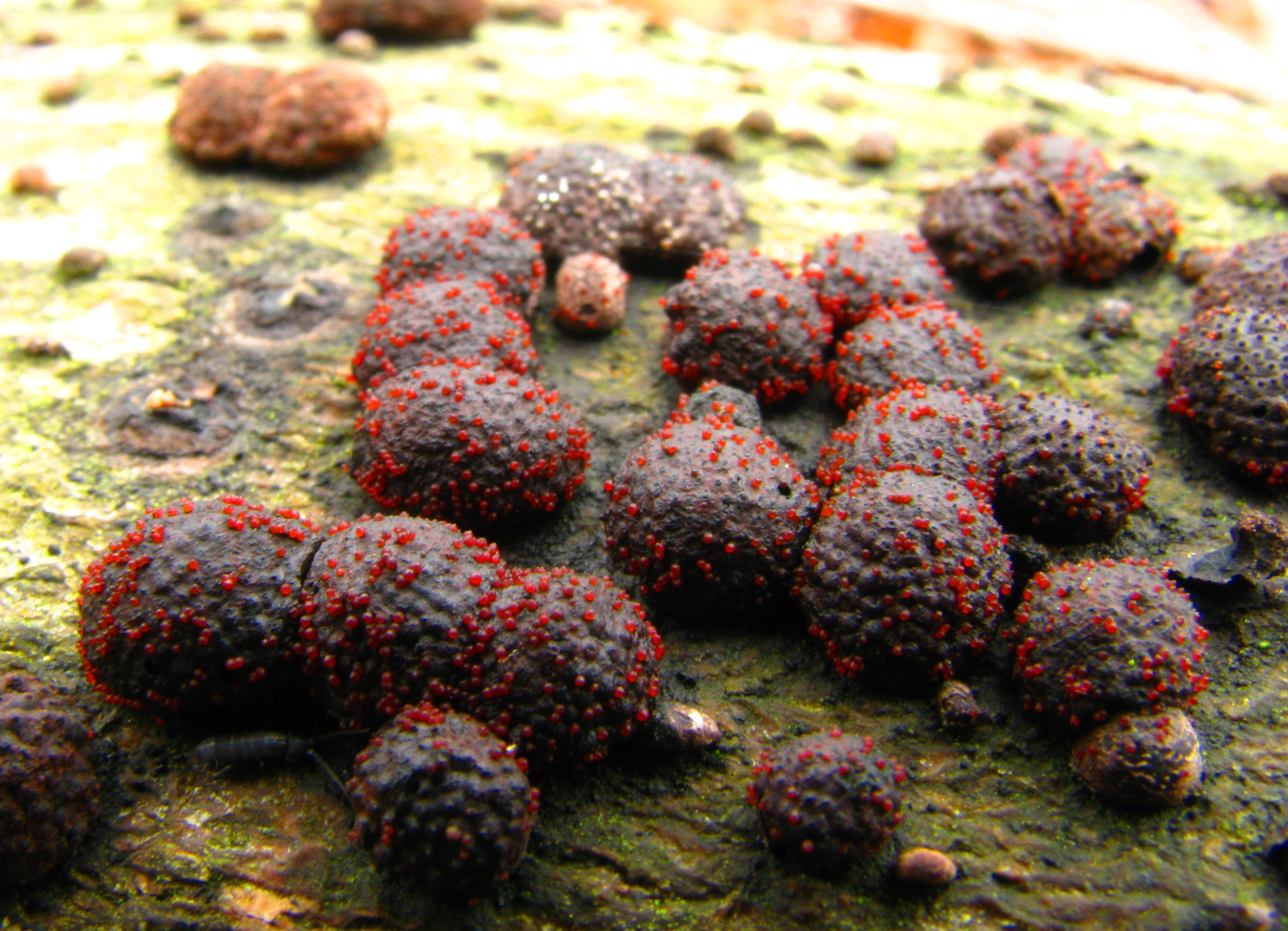
Nectria episphaeria (red beads) growing on Hypoxylon fragiforme

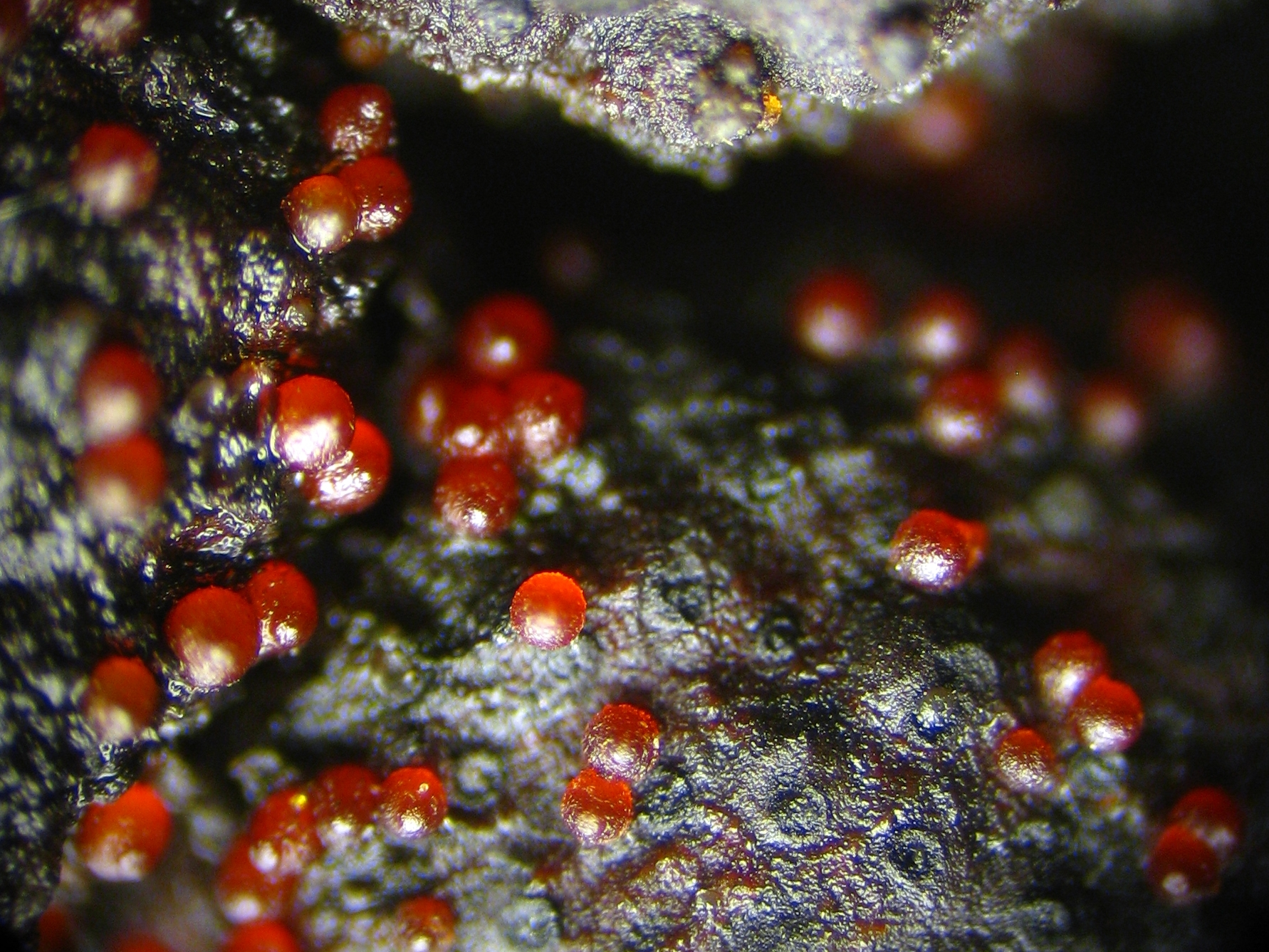
Nectria episphaeria growing on Hypoxylon fragiforme

== See also ==
- Tremella fuciformis
