= Penicillium thomii =

Scientific classification
- Kingdom: Fungi
- Division: Ascomycota
- Class: Eurotiomycetes
- Order: Eurotiales
- Family: Aspergillaceae
- Genus: Penicillium
- Species: P. thomii

Binomial name
- Penicillium thomii Maire, R.C.J.E. 1917

Type strain
- ATCC 48218, BCRC 31854, CBS 225.81, CCRC 31854, CMI 189694, FRR 2077, IAM 13669, IFO 6109, IMI 189694, JCM 22740, KCTC 6271, MUCL 31204, NBRC 6109, NRRL 2077, NRRL A-726, QM 1940

Synonyms
- Citromyces thomii, Penicillium lividum var. thomii, Penicillium yezoense, Penicillium yezoensum, Penicillium parallelosporum, Penicillium crocicola, Penicillium thomii var. flavescens, Penicillium quercetorum, Penicillium grancanariae

Species of fungus

Penicillium thomii is an anamorph species of fungus in the genus Penicillium which was isolated from spoiled faba beans in Australia. Penicillium thomii produces hadicidine, 6-methoxymelline and penicillic acid
