= List of natural phenols and polyphenols molecular formulas =

Natural phenols and polyphenols are a class of natural aromatic organic compounds with molecular formulas in which one or more hydroxy groups are attached directly to the benzene ring, generally formed from C, H and O.

The entries are sorted by mass.

| Formula | Example | Exact mass (u) |
|---|---|---|
| C7H8O | Cresols, others | 108.057515 |
| C7H6O2 | 4-Hydroxybenzaldehyde, others | 122.036779 |
| C8H10O | 4-Ethylphenol, others | 122.073164 |
| C7H8O2 | Gastrodigenin, others | 124.05243 |
| C6H6O3 | Hydroxyquinol, others | 126.031694 |
| C9H10O | Chavicol, others | 134.073166 |
| C8H8O2 | Piceol, others | 136.05243 |
| C7H6O3 | 2-Hydroxybenzoic acid, others | 138.031694 |
| C6H6O4 | 1,2,3,5-Tetrahydroxybenzene | 142.026608 |
| C9H6O2 | Coumarin | 146.036779 |
| C9H8O2 | Cinnamic acid | 148.05243 |
| C9H10O2 | 2-Methoxy-4-vinylphenol, others | 150.06808 |
| C10H14O | Carvacrol | 150.104465 |
| C8H8O3 | 4-Hydroxyphenylacetic acid, others | 152.047344 |
| C9H12O2 | 4-Ethylguaiacol | 152.083729 |
| C7H6O4 | Protocatechuic acid, others | 154.026608 |
| C8H10O3 | Hydroxytyrosol, others | 154.062993 |
| C9H6O3 | Umbelliferone, others | 162.031694 |
| C9H8O3 | Coumaric acid | 164.047344 |
| C10H12O2 | Chavibetol | 164.08373 |
| C9H10O3 | Paeonol, others | 166.062994 |
| C8H8O4 | 3,4-Dihydroxyphenylacetic acid, other | 168.042259 |
| C7H6O5 | Gallic acid, others | 170.021523 |
| C8H10O4 | Dihydroxyphenylethylene glycol | 170.057909 |
| C10H8O3 | Herniarin | 176.047344 |
| C9H6O4 | Aesculetin, others | 178.026609 |
| C10H10O3 | Coniferyl aldehyde, others | 178.062994 |
| C9H8O4 | Caffeic acid, others | 180.042259 |
| C10H12O3 | Coniferyl alcohol, others | 180.078643 |
| C11H16O2 | Olivetol | 180.11503 |
| C9H10O4 | Homovanillic acid, others | 182.057908 |
| C8H8O5 | 3,4-Dihydroxymandelic acid, others | 184.037173 |
| C10H8O4 | Scopoletin, others | 192.042259 |
| C10H10O4 | Ferulic acid, others | 194.057909 |
| C14H10O | 1-Hydroxyphenanthrene, others | 194.073165 |
| C9H8O5 | 3,4,6-Trihydroxycinnamic acid | 196.037173 |
| C9H10O5 | Syringic acid, others | 198.052823 |
| C11H6O4 | Bergaptol, other | 202.026609 |
| C11H10O4 | Eugenin | 206.057909 |
| C10H8O5 | Fraxetin | 208.037173 |
| C11H12O4 | Sinapaldehyde, others | 208.073559 |
| C10H10O5 | 2,4-Diacetylphloroglucinol | 210.052823 |
| C13H8O3 | Urolithin B | 212.047344 |
| C10H12O5 | Danielone; others | 212.068473 |
| C14H12O2 | Pinosylvin | 212.08373 |
| C14H14O2 | Lunularin | 214.09938 |
| C12H12O4 | Eugenitin | 220.073559 |
| C11H8O5 | Purpurogallin | 220.037173 |
| C11H12O5 | Sinapinic acid | 224.068473 |
| C15H12O2 | 4-phenylcoumarin, others | 224.083729 |
| C13H8O4 | Urolithin A | 228.042259 |
| C14H12O3 | Resveratrol | 228.078644 |
| C14H14O3 | Dihydro-resveratrol | 230.094294 |
| C13H14O4 | Vidalenolone | 234.089209 |
| C15H24O2 | DB-2073, others | 236.17763 |
| C15H10O3 | 3-hydroxyflavone | 238.062994 |
| C16H14O2 | Methyl hydroxychalcone | 238.09938 |
| C15H12O3 | Plicatol B | 240.078644 |
| C15H14O3 | Equol, others | 242.094294 |
| C14H12O4 | Piceatannol | 244.073559 |
| C13H10O5 | Hispidin, others | 246.052823 |
| C15H18O3 | Plicatin B | 246.125594 |
| C12H10O6 | Difucol, others | 250.047738 |
| C15H10O4 | Chrysin, others | 254.057909 |
| C16H14O3 | Dalbergichromene | 254.094294 |
| C17H18O2 | 3,5-Dihydroxy-4-isopropyl-trans-stilbene | 254.13068 |
| C15H11O4 | Apigeninidin | 255.065734 |
| C15H9O2Cl | 4'-chloroaurone | 256.029107 |
| C14H8O5 | Purpurin, others | 256.037173 |
| C15H12O4 | Isoliquiritigenin, others | 256.073559 |
| C16H16O3 | Pterostilbene, others | 256.109944 |
| C15H14O4 | Guibourtinidol, others | 258.089209 |
| C15H18O4 | Plicatin A | 262.120509 |
| C12H10O7 | Bifuhalol | 266.042664 |
| C18H18O2 | Honokiol, others | 266.13068 |
| C15H8O5 | Coumestrol | 268.037175 |
| C16H12O4 | Formonetin, others | 268.073559 |
| C15H10O5 | Apigenin, others | 270.052823 |
| C16H14O4 | Imperatorin, others | 270.089209 |
| C15H11O5 | Fisetinidin, others | 271.060648 |
| C15H12O5 | Butin, others | 272.068473 |
| C16H16O4 | Gnetucleistol E | 272.104859 |
| C15H14O5 | Fisetinidol, others | 274.084123 |
| C14H12O6 | Ammiol | 276.063388 |
| C19H20O2 | 4-O-Methylhonokiol | 280.14633 |
| C16H10O5 | Damnacanthal, others | 282.052823 |
| C18H18O3 | Obovatol | 282.125594 |
| C15H8O6 | Rhein | 284.032088 |
| C16H12O5 | Biochanin A, others | 284.068473 |
| C17H16O4 | Flavokavain B, others | 284.104859 |
| C16H13O5+ | Diosmetinidin | 285.076299 |
| C15H10O6 | Kaempferol, others | 286.047738 |
| C16H14O5 | Isosakuranetin, others | 286.084124 |
| C13H18O7 | Gastrodin, others | 286.105253 |
| C20H30O | Ferruginol, others | 286.229666 |
| C15H11O6 | Aurantinidin, others | 287.055562 |
| C15H12O6 | Aromadedrin, others | 288.063388 |
| C16H16O5 | Alkannin | 288.099773 |
| C15H14O6 | Catechin, others | 290.079038 |
| C18H12O4 | Karanjin | 292.073559 |
| C13H12O8 | Coutaric acid, others | 296.053217 |
| C16H10O6 | Irilone | 298.047738 |
| C17H14O5 | Pterocarpin | 298.084125 |
| C14H18O7 | Picein | 298.105253 |
| C16H12O6 | Diosmetin, others | 300.063388 |
| C13H16O8 | 4-Hydroxybenzoic acid 4-O-glucoside | 300.084516 |
| C17H16O5 | Flavokavain C, others | 300.099774 |
| C14H20O7 | Salidroside | 300.120903 |
| C18H20O4 | 5,7,4'-Trimethoxyflavan | 300.136159 |
| C16H13O6 | Peonidin | 301.071213 |
| C14H6O8 | Ellagic acid | 302.006267 |
| C15H10O7 | Quercetin, others | 302.042653 |
| C16H14O6 | Dihydrokaempferide, others | 302.079038 |
| C17H18O5 | Diffutidin | 302.115423 |
| C18H22O4 | Enterodiol, others | 302.151809 |
| C15H11O7 | 6-Hydroxycyanidin, others | 303.050477 |
| C15H12O7 | Dihydromorin, others | 304.058303 |
| C16H16O6 | Meciadanol, others | 304.094688 |
| C17H20O5 | Oleocanthal | 304.131073 |
| C15H14O7 | Epigallocatechin, others | 306.073953 |
| C20H18O3 | 2,4-Bis(4-hydroxybenzyl) phenol | 306.125594 |
| C16H20O6 | Monocerin | 308.1259876 |
| C13H12O9 | Caftaric acid | 312.048132 |
| C13H16O9 | Norbergenin | 314.063782 |
| C17H14O6 | Ermanin, others | 314.079038 |
| C18H18O5 | Flavokavain A, others | 314.115424 |
| C17H15O6 | Rosinidin | 315.086863 |
| C16H12O7 | Isorhamnetin, others | 316.058303 |
| C19H24O4 | Ferujol | 316.167459 |
| C18H20O5 | Combretastatin A4 | 316.131074 |
| C16H13O7 | Petunidin, others | 317.066127 |
| C15H10O8 | Myricetin, others | 318.037567 |
| C21H34O2 | Bilobol, others | 318.25588 |
| C14H8O9 | Luteic acid | 320.016832 |
| C15H12O8 | Ampelopsin, others | 320.053217 |
| C14H10O9 | Digallic acid | 322.032481 |
| C15H14O8 | Leucodelphinidin | 322.068867 |
| C16H18O7 | Leucopeonidin | 322.105252 |
| C20H18O4 | Phaseolin (pterocarpan) | 322.120508 |
| C18H12O6 | Atromentin, others | 324.063388 |
| C20H20O4 | Glabridin | 324.136158 |
| C14H14O9 | Fertaric acid | 326.06378 |
| C15H18O8 | p-Coumaric acid glucoside | 326.100168 |
| C20H22O4 | Acutifolin A | 326.151809 |
| C14H16O9 | Bergenin | 328.079432 |
| C18H16O6 | Salvigenin, others | 328.094688 |
| C16H24O7 | Rhododendrin | 328.152203 |
| C20H24O4 | Macelignan | 328.167459 |
| C17H14O7 | Ombuin, others | 330.073953 |
| C20H26O4 | Carnosol, others | 330.1831084 |
| C17H15O7 | Malvidin, others | 331.081778 |
| C16H12O8 | 5-O-methylmyricetin, others | 332.053217 |
| C13H16O10 | Glucogallin | 332.074347 |
| C14H20O9 | Koaburaside | 332.110732 |
| C18H20O6 | Combretastatin A1 | 332.125988 |
| C16H14O8 | Barceloneic acid B | 334.068867 |
| C21H18O4 | Karanjachromene | 334.120509 |
| C18H22O6 | Combretastatin B-1 | 334.141638 |
| C16H16O8 | Dactylifric acid | 336.084517 |
| C20H16O5 | Alpinumisoflavone | 336.099774 |
| C21H20O4 | Gastrol | 336.136159 |
| C14H10O10 | Hexahydroxydiphenic acid | 338.027396 |
| C20H18O5 | Glyceollin III, others | 338.115424 |
| C21H22O4 | Bergamottin, others | 338.151809 |
| C15H16O9 | Aesculin | 340.079432 |
| C20H20O5 | 8-Prenylnaringenin | 340.131074 |
| C19H18O6 | Zapotin, others | 342.110338 |
| C16H22O8 | Coniferin | 342.13147 |
| C14H16O10 | Theogallin | 344.074347 |
| C18H16O7 | Ayanin, other | 344.089603 |
| C20H24O5 | 3,4-Divanillyltetrahydrofuran | 344.162374 |
| C18H17O7 | Capensinidin, others | 345.097428 |
| C17H14O8 | Eupatolitin | 346.068867 |
| C18H18O7 | Scillavone B | 346.105253 |
| C19H22O6 | Dihydrokanakugiol | 346.141638 |
| C17H16O8 | Asterric acid | 348.084517 |
| C14H10O11 | Dehydrohexahydroxydiphenic acid | 354.022311 |
| C16H18O9 | Chlorogenic acid, others | 354.095082 |
| C20H18O6 | Carpanone, others | 354.110338 |
| C21H22O5 | Xanthohumol | 354.146724 |
| C14H12O11 | Chebulic acid | 356.037961 |
| C20H20O6 | Balanophonin, others | 356.125988 |
| C21H24O5 | Myricanone | 356.162374 |
| C19H18O7 | Retusin | 358.105253 |
| C20H22O6 | Matairesinol, others | 358.141638 |
| C18H16O8 | Centaureidin, others | 360.084517 |
| C20H16O7 | Gmelanone | 368.089603 |
| C21H20O6 | Curcumin, others | 368.125988 |
| C18H10O9 | Eckstolonol | 370.032482 |
| C20H18O7 | Sesamolin | 370.105253 |
| C18H12O9 | Eckol | 372.048132 |
| C20H20O7 | Sinensetin | 372.120903 |
| C21H24O6 | Arctigenin | 372.157289 |
| C18H14O9 | Fucophlorethol A, others | 374.063782 |
| C19H18O8 | Chrysosplenetin | 374.100168 |
| C20H18O8 | Diferulic acids, others | 386.100159 |
| C20H20O8 | Combretol | 388.115818 |
| C20H22O8 | Piceid, other | 390.131468 |
| C22H26O7 | Habenariol, others | 402.167853 |
| C20H20O9 | Brickellin, others | 404.110732 |
| C21H24O8 | Mallotophenone | 404.147117 |
| C20H22O9 | Astringin | 406.126382 |
| C24H26O6 | Mangostin | 410.172939 |
| C21H20O9 | Aleuritin, other | 416.110732 |
| C20H18O10 | Juglanin, others | 418.089997 |
| C21H22O9 | Aloin, others | 418.126382 |
| C22H26O8 | Syringaresinol | 418.162781 |
| C21H24O9 | Rhaponticin, others | 420.142031 |
| C23H29ClO5 | Ascofuranone | 420.170352 |
| C26H28O5 | Glycyrrhizol | 420.193674 |
| C19H18O11 | Mangiferin | 422.084911 |
| C28H24O4 | Riccardin C | 424.167459 |
| C24H26O7 | Quebecol | 426.167852 |
| C22H20O9 | Durantin A | 428.110732 |
| C22H22O9 | Ononin | 430.126382 |
| C21H20O10 | Apigetrin, others | 432.105647 |
| C21H21O10+ | Callistephin | 433.113472 |
| C20H18O11 | Avicularin | 434.084911 |
| C21H22O10 | Engeletin | 434.121297 |
| C21H24O10 | Phlorizin, others | 436.136947 |
| C22H14O10 | Polyozellin | 438.058696 |
| C22H18O10 | Epicatechin gallate | 442.089997 |
| C24H26O8 | Mallotochromene | 442.162768 |
| C21H18O11 | Baicalin | 446.084911 |
| C24H30O8 | Desaspidin, others | 446.194068 |
| C21H20O11 | Astragalin, others | 448.100561 |
| C25H20O8 | Knipholone | 448.115817 |
| C22H24O10 | Sakuranin | 448.136947 |
| C21H21O11+ | Chrysanthemin, other | 449.108386 |
| C21H22O11 | Astilbin, others | 450.116212 |
| C24H20O9 | Cinchonain-Ib | 452.110732 |
| C21H24O11 | Aspalathin, others | 452.131861 |
| C21H10O12 | Flavogallonic acid dilactone | 454.017225 |
| C28H22O6 | Epsilon-viniferin, other | 454.141638 |
| C24H24O9 | Steganacin | 456.142032 |
| C21H14O12 | Flavogallonic acid | 458.048525 |
| C22H18O11 | Epigallocatechin gallate | 458.084911 |
| C25H30O8 | Mallotojaponin B | 458.194067 |
| C22H20O11 | Oroxindin | 460.100561 |
| C30H36O4 | Sophoradin | 460.26136 |
| C21H18O12 | Scutellarin, others | 462.079826 |
| C22H23O11 | Peonidin 3-O-glucoside, others | 463.124036 |
| C21H20O12 | Isoquercitin, others | 464.095476 |
| C23H28O10 | Diffutin | 464.168247 |
| C21H21O12+ | Myrtilin | 465.103301 |
| C21H22O12 | Hyperoside, others | 466.111126 |
| C22H26O11 | Curculigoside A | 466.147512 |
| C24H20O10 | Gyrophoric acid | 468.105647 |
| C21H10O13 | Valoneic acid dilactone | 470.012139 |
| C28H22O7 | Ampelopsin A | 470.136553 |
| C28H24O7 | Amurensin A | 472.152203 |
| C23H24O11 | Eupalin | 476.131862 |
| C21H18O13 | Miquelianin | 478.074741 |
| C22H23O12 | Petunidin-3-O-glucoside | 479.118951 |
| C20H18O14 | 2,3-(S)-Hexahydroxydiphenoyl-D-glucose | 482.069655 |
| C20H20O14 | 1-O,6-O-Digalloyl-beta-D-glucose | 484.085305 |
| C26H20O10 | Globoidnan A | 492.10565 |
| C23H24O12 | Eupatolin, others | 492.126776 |
| C23H25O12 | Oenin, others | 493.134601 |
| C24H16O12 | 7-Phloroethol | 496.064176 |
| C24H18O12 | Tetraphlorethol C | 498.079825 |
| C26H26O10 | Phylloflavan | 498.152597 |
| C21H14O15 | Sanguisorbic acid, other | 506.03327 |
| C26H34O10 | Aviculin | 506.215197 |
| C29H36O8 | Mallotojaponin C | 512.241018 |
| C30H28O8 | Rottlerin | 516.1784168 |
| C25H25O12 | Cynarine, other | 517.134053 |
| C26H30O11 | Phellamurin | 518.178812 |
| C25H24O13 | Oxovitisin A | 532.121691 |
| C26H30O12 | Amurensin (flavonol) | 534.173726 |
| C30H18O10 | Amentoflavone | 538.089997 |
| C25H32O13 | Oleuropein | 540.184289 |
| C21H18O15S | Theograndin I | 542.036641 |
| C30H24O10 | Geranin A | 544.136946 |
| C26H25O14 | Vitisin A | 561.124430 |
| C29H24O12 | Theaflavin | 564.126776 |
| C26H28O14 | Apiin | 564.147904 |
| C26H30O14 | Castavinol C3 | 566.163555 |
| C26H32O14 | Mulberroside A | 568.179206 |
| C35H26O8 | Viniferal | 574.162766 |
| C30H24O12 | Proanthocyanidin A1, others | 576.126776 |
| C30H26O12 | B type proanthocyanidins | 578.142426 |
| C27H30O14 | Kaempferitrin, others | 578.163556 |
| C27H32O14 | Naringin | 580.179206 |
| C27H34O14 | Naringin dihydrochalcone | 582.194856 |
| C29H44O12 | Ouabain | 584.283277 |
| C30H26O13 | Prodelphinidin B3, others | 594.137340 |
| C27H30O15 | Kaempferol 3-O-rutinoside | 594.15847 |
| C28H34O14 | Poncirin | 594.194856 |
| C27H31O15+ | Pelargonin, others | 595.166295 |
| C30H18O14 | Phlorofucofuroeckol A | 602.069655 |
| C28H32O15 | Diosmin | 608.17412 |
| C29H22O15 | Epigallocatechin 3,5-digallate | 610.09587 |
| C27H30O16 | Rutin | 610.153385 |
| C28H34O15 | Hesperidin | 610.18977 |
| C30H27O14 | Delphinidin 3-(6-p-coumaroyl)glucoside | 611.140081 |
| C27H31O16 | Tulipanin | 611.16121 |
| C28H36O15 | Neohesperidin dihydrochalcone | 612.20542 |
| C28H24O16 | Balanophotannin D | 616.106435 |
| C34H32O11 | Diptoindonesin A | 616.194460 |
| C32H25O13 | Compound NJ2 | 617.129515 |
| C28H26O16 | Taxillusin | 618.12207 |
| C29H36O15 | Verbascoside | 624.205419 |
| C31H29O14 | Pinotin A | 625.155735 |
| C27H30O17 | Myricetin 3-O-rutinoside, others | 626.1482994 |
| C27H20O18 | Castalin | 632.064964 |
| C27H22O18 | Punicacortein A, others | 634.08062 |
| C32H26O14 | Actinorhodin | 634.132263 |
| C28H14O18 | Gallagic acid | 638.018013 |
| C32H31O14 | Malvidin-3-O-(6-p-coumaroyl)glucoside | 639.170832 |
| C28H24O18 | 3,4,5-Tri-O-galloylquinic acid | 648.096264 |
| C29H35O17 | Malvin | 655.187425 |
| C33H40O15 | Icariin | 676.236721 |
| C35H18O15 | Norbadione A | 678.06457 |
| C42H30O9 | Alpha-viniferin | 678.188983 |
| C29H42O18 | Tangshenoside I | 678.237114 |
| C42H32O9 | Trans-diptoindonesin B, others | 680.204633 |
| C32H46O16 | Secoisolariciresinol diglucoside | 686.278583 |
| C36H28O16 | Theaflavin-3-gallate | 716.137735 |
| C33H40O19 | Robinin | 740.216379 |
| C36H22O18 | Dieckol | 742.0806128 |
| C32H38O20 | CTN-986 | 742.195642 |
| C33H42O19 | Troxerutin | 742.232027 |
| C34H46O18 | Eleutheroside D | 742.26842 |
| C34H42O20 | Xanthorhamnin | 770.226944 |
| C34H22O22 | Punicalin, others | 782.060272 |
| C34H24O22 | Pedunculagin, others | 784.075922 |
| C35H46O20 | Echinacoside | 786.258244 |
| C34H26O23 | Punigluconin | 802.086495 |
| C41H43O17 | Malvidin glucoside-ethyl-catechin | 807.250024 |
| C45H36O15 | Selligueain A | 816.20542 |
| C48H42O14 | Foeniculoside I | 842.257456 |
| C45H36O18 | Cinnamtannin B1 | 864.190164 |
| C45H38O18 | Proanthocyanidin C1, others | 866.205814 |
| C43H32O20 | Theaflavin digallate | 868.148693 |
| C45H38O20 | Prodelphinidin C2 | 898.195643 |
| C56H42O12 | Vitisin A, other | 906.267627 |
| C43H42O22 | Carthamin | 910.216773 |
| C56H40O13 | Amurensin K | 920.246891 |
| C56H44O13 | Kobophenol A | 924.278191 |
| C41H26O26 | Castalagin, others | 934.071231 |
| C42H30O25 | Stenophyllanin A | 934.107615 |
| C41H28O26 | Casuarictin, others | 936.086881 |
| C41H30O26 | Tellimagrandin II, others | 938.102531 |
| C41H32O26 | Pentagalloyl glucose | 940.118181 |
| C41H28O27 | Granatin B, others | 952.081794 |
| C41H30O27 | Chebulagic acid | 954.097446 |
| C41H32O27 | Chebulinic acid | 956.113096 |
| C46H34O30 | Grandinin | 1066.11349 |
| C48H28O30 | Punicalagin, others | 1084.06654 |
| C48H32O30 | Bicornin | 1088.097838 |
| C48H32O32 | Mallotusinic acid | 1120.087668 |
| C70H50O15 | Amurensin E | 1130.314971 |
| C53H59O30+ | Violdelphin | 1175.309115 |
| C56H38O31 | Acutissimin A | 1206.139705 |
| C55H32O34 | Punicalagin alpha | 1236.077498 |
| C54H38O37 | Mallojaponin | 1278.109253 |
| C85H64O18 | Chunganenol | 1372.4092628 |
| C76H52O46 | Tannic acid | 1700.172974 |
| C82H50O51 | roburin A | 1834.136983 |
| C82H56O51 | Cornusiin E | 1856.178865 |
| C82H54O52 | Sanguiin H-6 | 1870.158112 |
| C116H76O74 | Raspberry ellagitannin | 2652.218384 |
| C123H80O78 | Lambertianin C | 2804.229338 |
| C164H106O104 | Lambertianin D | 3738.3005684 |
