= C8H10O3 =

The molecular formula C_{8}H_{10}O_{3} (molar mass: 154.16 g/mol, exact mass: 154.0629938 u) may refer to:

- Hydroxytyrosol
- Isovanillyl alcohol
- Methacrylic anhydride
- Syringol
- Terrein
- Vanillyl alcohol
