= C14H14O2 =

The molecular formula C_{14}H_{14}O_{2} (molar mass: 214.260 g/mol, exact mass: 214.0994 u) may refer to:

- Ichthyothereol
- Lunularin
- Phenylethyl resorcinol
