= C16H14O3 =

The molecular formula C_{16}H_{14}O_{3} (molar mass: 254.28 g/mol, exact mass: 254.094294 u) may refer to:

- Chalepensin
- Dalbergichromene
- Dexketoprofen
- Fenbufen
- Ketoprofen

- (R)-Ketoprofen
