= C20H30O =

The molecular formula C_{20}H_{30}O (molar mass: 286.45 g/mol, exact mass: 286.229666 u) may refer to:

- Ferruginol, a meroterpene natural phenol
- Retinol, Vitamin A1
- Taxadienone
- Totarol, a meroterpene natural phenol
