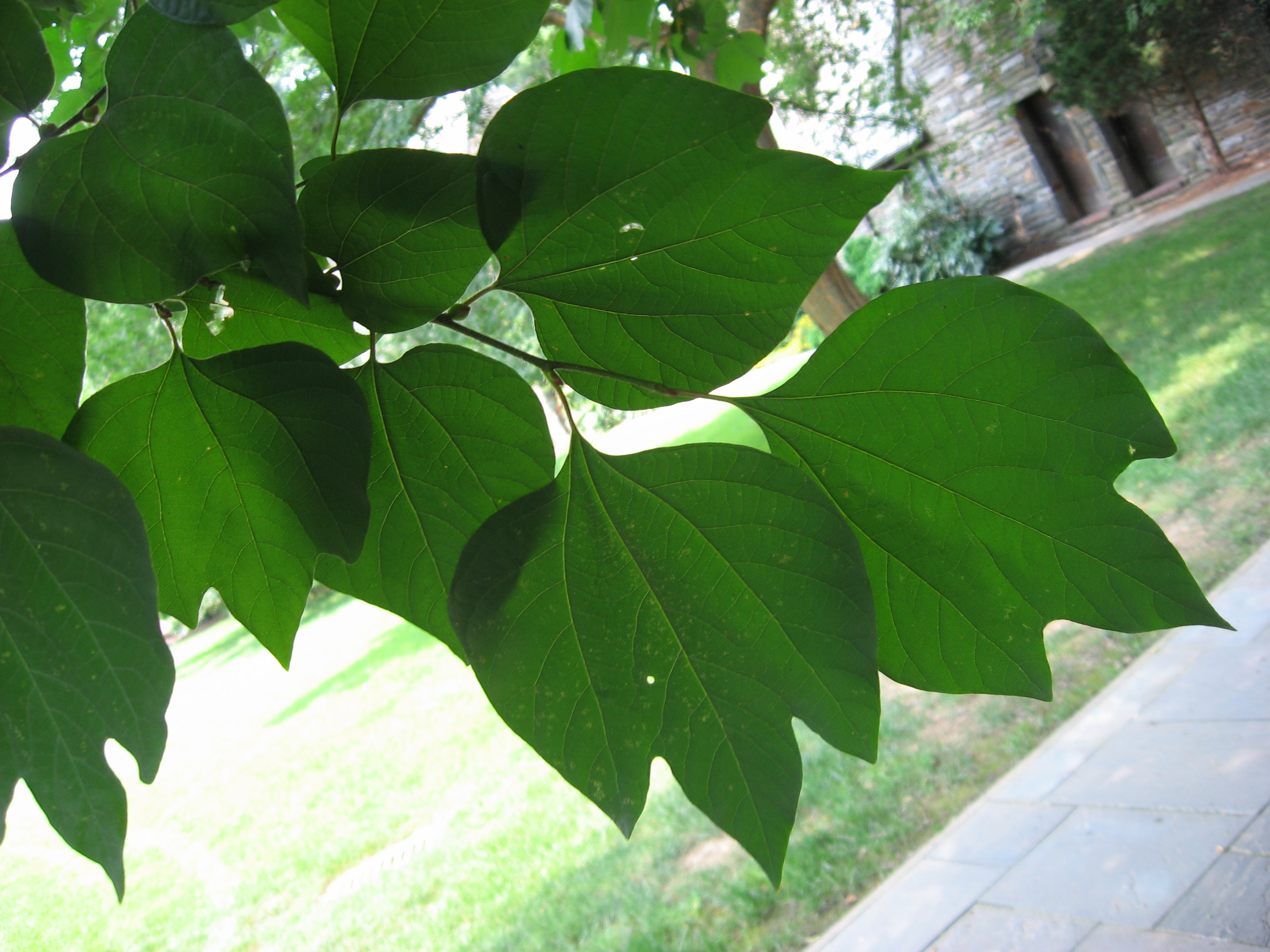

Conservation status
- Least Concern (IUCN 3.1)

Scientific classification
- Kingdom: Plantae
- Clade: Embryophytes
- Clade: Tracheophytes
- Clade: Spermatophytes
- Clade: Angiosperms
- Clade: Magnoliids
- Order: Laurales
- Family: Lauraceae
- Genus: Lindera
- Species: L. obtusiloba

Binomial name
- Lindera obtusiloba Blume

Varieties
- Lindera obtusiloba var. heterophylla (Meisn.) H.P.Tsui; Lindera obtusiloba var. obtusiloba

Synonyms
- Benzoin obtusilobum (Blume) Kuntze; synonyms of var. heterophylla: Benzoin heterophyllum (Meisn.) Kuntze; Benzoin sericeum Hook.f. & Thomson ex Meisn.; Lindera heterophylla Meisn.; Lindera triloba Hook.f. & Thomson ex Meisn.; Tetranthera lusona Nees ex Meisn.; Tetranthera vestita Wall.; synonyms of var. obtusiloba: Benzoin cercidifolium (Hemsl.) Rehder; Benzoin obtusilobum var. ovatum Nakai; Benzoin obtusilobum f. quinqelobum Uyeki; Benzoin obtusilobum f. villosum (Blume) Nakai; Lindera cercidifolia Hemsl.; Lindera mollis Oliv.; Lindera obtusiloba f. ovata (Nakai) C.M.Pak; Lindera obtusiloba var. praetermissa (Grierson & D.G.Long) H.P.Tsui; Lindera obtusiloba f. quinqueloba (Uyeki) C.M.Pak; Lindera obtusiloba var. tomentosa Miq.; Lindera obtusiloba f. villosa (Blume) T.B.Lee; Lindera obtusiloba var. villosa Blume; Lindera praetermissa Grierson & D.G.Long

= Lindera obtusiloba =

Japanese spicebush

Species of flowering plant

Lindera obtusiloba, the blunt-lobed spice bush, is a species of flowering plant in the laurel family (Lauraceae). It is native to the Himalayas, northeastern India, Myanmar, China, Korea and Japan. It is a spreading deciduous shrub or small tree growing to 6 m (20 ft) tall and wide, with glossy aromatic leaves and deep yellow flowers which appear in spring before the leaves. Juvenile leaves are lobed (as the name suggests) and are deep purple. The leaves often turn yellow in autumn.

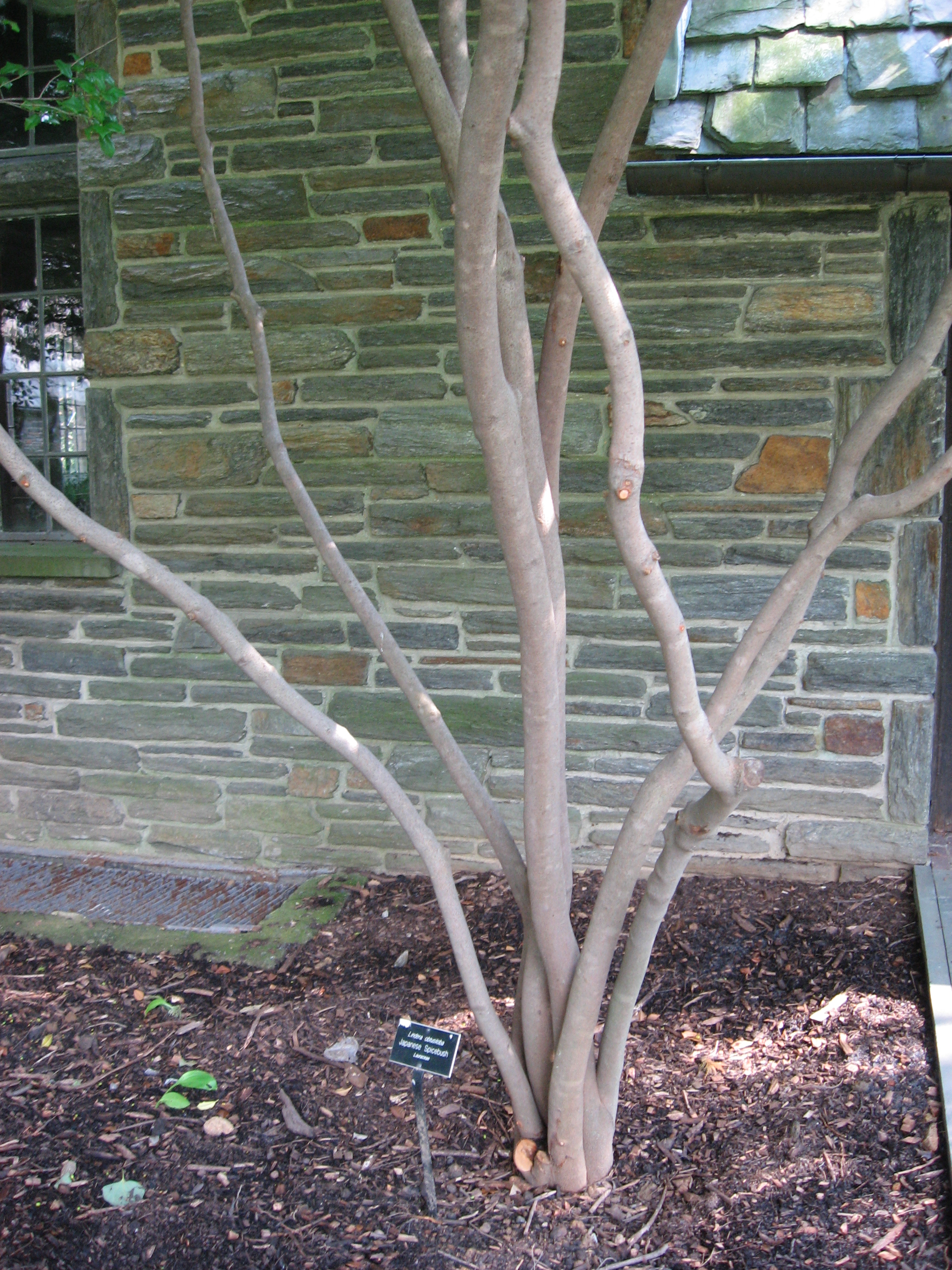
Closeup of trunks

The species was described by Carl Ludwig Blume in 1851. Two varieties are accepted.

- Lindera obtusiloba var. heterophylla (Meisn.) H.P.Tsui – Bhutan, Tibet, northeastern India, Myanmar, China, Korea, and Japan
- Lindera obtusiloba var. obtusiloba – Himalayas, northestern India, Myanmar, China, Korea, and Japan

This plant has gained the Royal Horticultural Society's Award of Garden Merit.

== Uses ==
A Lindera obtusiloba water extract inhibited mast-cell-derived allergic inflammation in vitro and vivo, suggesting it may have possible uses in allergic diseases such as allergic rhinitis, asthma and atopic dermatitis.

The plant contains the anti-histamine compound koaburaside and also a source of valuable obtusilic acid.
