= C17H14O5 =

The molecular formula C_{17}H_{14}O_{5} (molar mass: 298.29 g/mol, exact mass: 298.084125 u) may refer to:

- Fumarin, a coumarin derivative
- Pterocarpin, a pterocarpan
