= C10H10O5 =

The molecular formula C_{10}H_{10}O_{5} (molar mass: 210.18 g/mol) may refer to:

- 2,4-Diacetylphloroglucinol
- 2-Hydroxyethyl terephthalic acid
- 5-Hydroxyferulic acid, a hydroxycinnamic acid
