= C20H18O6 =

The molecular formula C_{20}H_{18}O_{6} (molar mass: 354.35 g/mol, exact mass: 354.1103 u) may refer to:

- Carpanone, a lignan
- Luteone (isoflavone)
- Sesamin, a lignan
