= C11H16O2 =

The molecular formula C_{11}H_{16}O_{2} (molar mass: 180.24354 g/mol, exact mass: 180.11503 u) may refer to:

- Butylated hydroxyanisole
- Dihydroactinidiolide
- Jasmolone
- Olivetol, an alkylresorcinol found in lichens
