= C6H6O3 =

The molecular formula C_{6}H_{6}O_{3} may refer to:

- Cyclohexanetriones
- Hydroxymethylfurfural
- Hydroxyquinol
- Isomaltol
- Levoglucosenone
- Maltol
- Phloroglucinol
- Pyrogallol
- Triacetic acid lactone
