= C17H14O6 =

The molecular formula C_{17}H_{14}O_{6} may refer to:

- Coeloginin, a phenanthrenoid found in the orchid Coelogyne cristata
- Cirsimaritin, a flavone
- Ermanin, a flavonol
- Involutin
- Kumatakenin, a flavonol
- Pectolinarigenin, a flavone
- Pisatin, a phytoalexin
- Velutin, a flavone
