= C16H10O5 =

The molecular formula C_{16}H_{10}O_{5} (molar mass: 282.24 g/mol, exact mass: 282.052823 u) may refer to:

- Damnacanthal, an anthraquinone
- Pseudobaptigenin, an isoflavone
