= C14H16O10 =

The molecular formula C_{14}H_{16}O_{10} (molar mass: 344.27 g/mol, exact mass: 344.0743 u) may refer to:

- Anthocyanone A, a degradation product of malvidin found in wine
- Theogallin, a phenolic compound found in tea
