= C9H6O2 =

The molecular formula C_{9}H_{6}O_{2} (molar mass: 146.14 g/mol, exact mass: 146.036779 u) may refer to:

- Chromone
- Coumarin
- 1,3-Indandione
- Isocoumarin
- Phenylpropiolic acid
