= C20H26O4 =

The molecular formula C_{20}H_{26}O_{4} (molar mass: 330.42 g/mol, exact mass: 330.1831084 u) may refer to:

- Carnosol
- Momilactone B
