= C25H30O8 =

The molecular formula C_{25}H_{30}O_{8} (molar mass: 458.501 g/mol, exact mass: 458.1941 u) may refer to:

- Kadsurin
- Mallotojaponin B
