= C18H18O7 =

The molecular formula C_{18}H_{18}O_{7} (molar mass: 346.33 g/mol, exact mass: 346.1053 u) may refer to:

- Scillavone B
- Ramalic acid
