= C34H46O18 =

The molecular formula C_{34}H_{46}O_{18} (molar mass: 742.72 g/mol, exact mass: 742.2684 u) may refer to:

- Eleutheroside D
- Liriodendrin
