= C22H23O12 =

The molecular formula C_{22}H_{23}O_{12}, molar mass: 479.41 g/mol (aglycone), 514.86 g/mol (chloride), exact mass : 479.1189512 u (C_{22}H_{23}O_{12}^{+} (aglycone), C_{22}H_{23}O_{12}Cl (chloride)) may refer to:

- Petunidin-3-O-glucoside
- Pulchellidin 3-glucoside
