= C6H6O4 =

The molecular formula C_{6}H_{6}O_{4} (molar mass : 142.10 g/mol, exact mass : 142.026608 u) may refer to:

- Dimethyl acetylenedicarboxylate
- 5-Hydroxymaltol
- 2-Hydroxymuconate semialdehyde
- Kojic acid
- Muconic acid
- Tetrahydroxybenzene
  - 1,2,3,4-Tetrahydroxybenzene
  - 1,2,3,5-Tetrahydroxybenzene
  - 1,2,4,5-Tetrahydroxybenzene
