= C21H24O11 =

The molecular formula C_{21}H_{24}O_{11} (molar mass: 452.41 g/mol, exact mass: 452.131862 u) may refer to:

- Aspalathin, a dihydrochalcone glucoside
- Catechin-5-O-glucoside, a flavan-3-ol glucoside
- Catechin-7-O-glucoside, a flavan-3-ol glucoside
