= C23H24O12 =

The molecular formula C_{23}H_{24}O_{12} (exact mass: 492.12677623) may refer to:

- 5,2',3'-Trihydroxy-7,8-dimethoxyflavone 3'-glucoside (CAS number 113963-38-5)
- 5,2',6'-Trihydroxy-6,7-dimethoxyflavone 2'-glucoside (CAS number 168293-27-4)
- 6-Hydroxykaempferol 3,6-dimethyl ether 7-glucoside (CAS number 32214-79-2)
- 6-Hydroxyluteolin 6,3'-dimethyl ether 7-glucoside (CAS number 25474-11-7)
- 6-Hydroxyluteolin 6,4'-dimethyl ether 7-glucoside (CAS number 67557-77-1)
- 6-Hydroxyluteolin 6,7-dimethyl ether 4'-glucoside (CAS number 41087-98-3)
- 6-Hydroxyluteolin 7,3'-dimethyl ether 6-glucoside (CAS number 60032-93-1)
- 8-Hydroxyluteolin 8,3'-dimethyl ether 7-glucoside (CAS number 135043-85-5)
- Aurantio-obtusin beta-D-glucoside (CAS number 129025-96-3)
- Betuletol 3-galactoside (CAS number 128450-83-9)
- Betuletol 3-glucoside (CAS number 144599-04-2)
- Betuletol 7-glucoside (CAS number 158080-75-2)
- Burkinabin A (CAS number 720682-37-1)
- Burkinabin B (CAS number 720682-38-2)
- Burkinabin C (CAS number 720682-39-3)
- Caryatin 7-glucoside (CAS number 151590-52-2)
- Coccinoside A (CAS number 146555-76-2)
- Dillenetin 7-glucoside (CAS number 165460-83-3)
- Eupalitin 3-galactoside (CAS number 98604-37-6)
- Eupalitin 3-glucoside (CAS number 83117-60-6)
- Eupatolin (CAS number 29725-50-6)
- Homotectorigenin 7-O-glucoside (CAS number 41744-53-0)
- Hypolaetin 7,3'-dimethyl ether 4'-glucoside (CAS number 215113-46-5)
- Iristectorigenin A 7-O-glucoside (CAS number 37744-61-9)
- Iristectorigenin B 7-O-glucoside (CAS number 94396-09-5)
- Isopyrenin (CAS number 61252-85-5)
- Isothymusin 8-glucoside (CAS number 205682-11-7)
- Lagotiside (CAS number 123914-42-1)
- Licoagroside A (CAS number 325144-71-6)
- Limocitrin 3-rhamnoside (CAS number 90456-56-7)
- Okanin 4'-(6"-acetylglucoside) (CAS number 120163-15-7)
- Ombuin 3-galactoside (CAS number 69168-13-4)
- Ombuin 3-glucoside (CAS number 158642-42-3)
- Prudomenin (CAS number 24568-40-9)
- Quercetin 3,3'-dimethyl ether 4'-glucoside (CAS number 89648-74-8)
- Quercetin 3,3'-dimethyl ether 7-glucoside (CAS number 2345-97-3)
- Quercetin 3,4'-dimethyl ether 7-glucoside (CAS number 70324-45-7)
- Myricetin 3',4'-dimethyl ether 3-rhamnoside (CAS number 362603-38-1)
- Quercetin 3,7-dimethyl ether 5-glucoside (CAS number 128388-46-5)
- Quercetin 3,7-dimethyl ether 4'-glucoside (CAS number 102693-70-9)
- Quercetin-5,3'-dimethyl ether-3-glucoside (CAS number 74378-36-2)
- Rhamnazin 3-galactoside (CAS number 59359-34-1)
- Rhamnazin 3-glucoside (CAS number 20486-38-8)
- Rhamnazin 4'-glucoside (CAS number 80651-75-8)
- Syringetin 3-rhamnoside (CAS number 93126-00-2)
- Tricin 4'-glucoside (Tricin-4'-O-beta-D-glucopyranaoside, CAS number 71855-50-0)
- Tricin 5-glucoside (Tricin 5-O-beta-D-glucopyranoside, CAS number 32769-00-9)
- Tricin 7-O-glucoside (Tricin 7-O-beta-D-glucopyranoside, CAS number 32769-01-0)
