= C21H24O6 =

The molecular formula C_{21}H_{24}O_{6} (molar mass: 372.41 g/mol, exact mass: 372.1573 u) may refer to:

- Arctigenin
- 6',7'-Dihydroxybergamottin
