= C13H12O8 =

The molecular formula C_{13}H_{12}O_{8} (molar mass: 296.23 g/mol, exact mass: 296.0532 u) may refer to:

- Caffeoylmalic acid
- Coutaric acid
