= C18H10O9 =

The molecular formula C_{18}H_{10}O_{9} (molar mass: 370.27 g/mol, exact mass: 370.0325 u) may refer to:

- Eckstolonol
- Variegatorubin
