= C9H6O4 =

The molecular formula C_{9}H_{6}O_{4} (molar mass: 178.14 g/mol, exact mass 178.026609 u) may refer to:

- Aesculetin, a coumarin
- Daphnetin, a coumarin
- Ninhydrin (2,2-dihydroxyindane-1,3-dione)
