= C18H12O6 =

The molecular formula C_{18}H_{12}O_{6} (molar mass: 324.28 g/mol, exact mass: 324.0634 u) may refer to:

- Atromentin
- Hexahydroxytriphenylene (HHTP)
- Sterigmatocystin
- Grevilline A
