= C26H28O14 =

The molecular formula C_{26}H_{28}O_{14} (molar mass: 564.49 g/mol, exact mass 564.1479044 u) may refer to:

- Apiin
- Morindin
