= C10H10O3 =

The molecular formula C_{10}H_{10}O_{3} (molar mass : 178.185 g/mol, exact mass : 178.062994 u) may refer to:

- Calone
- Coniferyl aldehyde
- Mellein, a dihydroisocoumarin
- 3,4-(Methylenedioxyphenyl)-1-propanone
- 3,4-(Methylenedioxyphenyl)-2-propanone
- 3-Acetyl-6-methoxybenzaldehyde
