= Kadsurin =

Names
- Preferred IUPAC name (6R,7R,8R)-1,2,3,13-Tetramethoxy-6,7-dimethyl-5,6,7,8-tetrahydro-11H-benzo[3,4]cycloocta[1,2-f][1,3]benzodioxol-8-yl acetate

Identifiers
| CAS Number | 51670-40-7 |
| 3D model (JSmol) | Interactive image |
| ChEBI | CHEBI:67453 |
| ChEMBL | ChEMBL559796 |
| ChemSpider | 149552 |
| PubChem CID | 171064 |
| CompTox Dashboard (EPA) | DTXSID80199608 |
- InChI: InChI=1S/C25H30O8/c1-12-8-15-9-17(27-4)22(28-5)24(29-6)19(15)20-16(21(13(12)2)33-14(3)26)10-18-23(25(20)30-7)32-11-31-18/h9-10,12-13,21H,8,11H2,1-7H3/t12-,13-,21-/m1/s1 Key: QUGMSTJBNZWXQS-SQHYZVFZSA-N; InChI=1/C25H30O8/c1-12-8-15-9-17(27-4)22(28-5)24(29-6)19(15)20-16(21(13(12)2)33-14(3)26)10-18-23(25(20)30-7)32-11-31-18/h9-10,12-13,21H,8,11H2,1-7H3/t12-,13-,21-/m1/s1 Key: QUGMSTJBNZWXQS-SQHYZVFZBD
- SMILES: C[C@@H]1CC2=CC(=C(C(=C2C3=C(C4=C(C=C3[C@@H]([C@@H]1C)OC(=O)C)OCO4)OC)OC)OC)OC

Properties
| Chemical formula | C_{25}H_{30}O_{8} |
| Molar mass | 458.507 g·mol^{−1} |
- Except where otherwise noted, data are given for materials in their standard state (at 25 °C [77 °F], 100 kPa). Infobox references

Kadsurin is a bioactive isolate of Kadsura.
