= C20H20O4 =

The molecular formula C_{20}H_{20}O_{4} (molar mass: 324.37 g/mol, exact mass: 324.1361584 u) may refer to:

- Glabridin
- Isobavachalcone
