= C16H16O3 =

The molecular formula C_{16}H_{16}O_{3} (molar mass: 256.296 g/mol, exact mass: 256.109944 u) may refer to:

- Calostomal
- 2,2-Dimethoxy-2-phenylacetophenone
- Orchinol, a phenanthrenoid found in orchids
- Pterostilbene, a stilbenoid
