= C42H32O9 =

The molecular formula C_{42}H_{32}O_{9} (molar mass: 680.69 g/mol, exact mass: 680.204633 u) may refer to:

- Miyabenol C, a resveratrol trimer
- Trans-Diptoindonesin B, an oligomeric stilbenoid
