= C21H24O10 =

The molecular formula C_{21}H_{24}O_{10} (molar mass: 436.41 g/mol, exact mass: 436.136947 u) may refer to:

- Nothofagin, a C-linked phloretin glucoside
- Phlorizin, an O-linked phloretin glucoside
