= C10H8O3 =

The molecular formula C_{10}H_{8}O_{3} (molar mass: 176.16 g/mol, exact mass: 176.0473 u) may refer to:

- Herniarin, a methoxy analog of umbelliferone
- Hymecromone
