= C18H18O5 =

The molecular formula C_{18}H_{18}O_{5} (molar mass: 314.33 g/mol, exact mass: 314.115424 u) may refer to:

- Flavokavain A, a flavokavain found in the kava plant
- 7-Hydroxy-2,3,4,8-tetramethoxyphenanthrene, a phenanthrene found in the rhizome of Dioscorea communis
