= C20H16O5 =

The molecular formula C_{20}H_{16}O_{5} (molar mass: 336.33 g/mol, exact mass: 336.0998 u) may refer to:

- Alpinumisoflavone
- Psoralidin
