= C41H26O26 =

The molecular formula C_{41}H_{26}O_{26} (molar mass: 934.63 g/mol, exact mass: 934.0712 u) may refer to:

- Alnusiin, an ellagitannin
- Castalagin, an ellagitannin
