= C21H14O15 =

The molecular formula C_{21}H_{14}O_{15} (molar mass: 506.33 g/mol, exact mass: 506.03327 u) may refer to:

- Nonahydroxytriphenic acid
- Sanguisorbic acid
- Valoneic acid
