= C10H8O4 =

The molecular formula C_{10}H_{8}O_{4} (molar mass: 192.17 g/mol, exact mass: 192.0423 u) may refer to:

- Anemonin
- Furoin
- Scopoletin, a coumarin
- the monomer of polyethylene terephthalate
