= Quebecol =

Names
- IUPAC name 2,3,3-Tri-(3-methoxy-4-hydroxyphenyl)-1-propanol

Identifiers
CAS Number	1360605-46-4
3D model (JSmol)	Interactive image
ChEMBL	ChEMBL2426727
ChemSpider	29784847
PubChem CID	56838437
UNII	XE6U6NUC3D
CompTox Dashboard (EPA)	DTXSID301018794
- InChI: InChI=1S/C24H26O7/c1-29-21-10-14(4-7-18(21)26)17(13-25)24(15-5-8-19(27)22(11-15)30-2)16-6-9-20(28)23(12-16)31-3/h4-12,17,24-28H,13H2,1-3H3 Key: YYZUHPNBYRRBOR-UHFFFAOYSA-N; InChI=1/C24H26O7/c1-29-21-10-14(4-7-18(21)26)17(13-25)24(15-5-8-19(27)22(11-15)30-2)16-6-9-20(28)23(12-16)31-3/h4-12,17,24-28H,13H2,1-3H3 Key: YYZUHPNBYRRBOR-UHFFFAOYAE
- SMILES: COC1=C(C=CC(=C1)C(CO)C(C2=CC(=C(C=C2)O)OC)C3=CC(=C(C=C3)O)OC)O

Properties
Chemical formula	C_{24}H_{26}O_{7}
Molar mass	426.465 g·mol^{−1}
- Except where otherwise noted, data are given for materials in their standard state (at 25 °C [77 °F], 100 kPa). verify (what is ?) Infobox references

Quebecol is a polyphenolic chemical compound that has been isolated from maple syrup. It has the chemical formula C_{24}H_{26}O_{7} and the systematic name 2,3,3-tri-(3-methoxy-4-hydroxyphenyl)-1-propanol. Analysis of maple sap before it is converted into syrup suggests that this compound is not naturally present in the sap but, instead, is formed during extraction or processing. A total synthesis of the compound was reported in 2013.

The chemical compound is named after the Canadian province of Quebec which is the world’s largest producer of maple syrup.
