= Phenylethyl resorcinol =

Names
- IUPAC name 4-(1-phenylethyl)benzene-1,3-diol
- Other names: 4-(alpha-Methylbenzyl)resorcinol; 1,3-Benzenediol, 4-(1-phenylethyl); 4-(1-phenylethyl)-1,3-Benzenediol; Symwhite 377

Identifiers
CAS Number	85-27-8
3D model (JSmol)	Interactive image
ChEMBL	ChEMBL3961037
ChemSpider	9346995
DrugBank	DB14120
ECHA InfoCard	100.105.273
EC Number	480-070-0
PubChem CID	11171903
UNII	G37UFG162O
CompTox Dashboard (EPA)	DTXSID501005319
- InChI: InChI=1S/C14H14O2/c1-10(11-5-3-2-4-6-11)13-8-7-12(15)9-14(13)16/h2-10,15-16H,1H3 Key: PQSXNIMHIHYFEE-UHFFFAOYSA-N
- SMILES: CC(C1=CC=CC=C1)C2=C(C=C(C=C2)O)O

Properties
Chemical formula	C_{14}H_{14}O_{2}
Molar mass	214.264 g·mol^{−1}
Appearance	White powder
Density	1.24 g/mL (20 °C)
Melting point	78–79 °C (172–174 °F; 351–352 K)
Boiling point	244 °C (12 mmHg); 197-198 °C (4 Torr)
Solubility in water	0.159 g/L

Hazards
- GHS labelling
Pictograms	(GHS05: Corrosive) (GHS07: Exclamation mark) (GHS09: Environmental hazard)
Signal word	Danger
Hazard statements	H302, H314, H315, H319, H411
Precautionary statements	P260, P264, P264+P265, P270, P273, P280, P301+P317, P301+P330+P331, P302+P352, P302+P361+P354, P304+P340, P305+P351+P338, P305+P354+P338, P316, P317, P321, P330, P332+P317, P337+P317, P362+P364, P363, P391, P405, P501
- Except where otherwise noted, data are given for materials in their standard state (at 25 °C [77 °F], 100 kPa). Infobox references

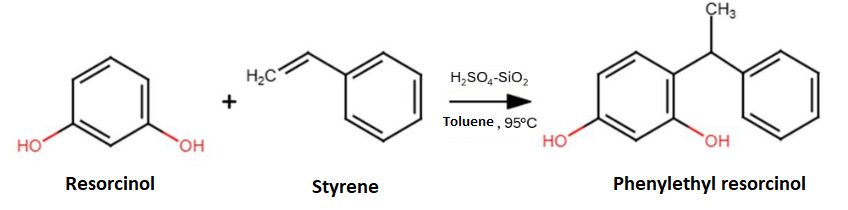
Chemical equation for the synthesis of phenylethyl resorcinol

Phenylethyl resorcinol is a phenolic compound and a derivative of resorcinol. It is commercially synthesized by Symrise, a German chemicals company producing flavors and fragrances, and it is sold under the name Symwhite 377. Used for its antioxidant properties and its action as an inhibitor of melanin production, it is found in cosmetic products (such as creams and lotions) as a skin whitening agent.

== Synthesis ==
With the aim to produce it at an industrial scale, different chemical syntheses are still developed to maximize the reaction yield while minimizing by-products. The main aspect to improve is the catalyst's nature.

Phenylethyl resorcinol can be synthesized from resorcin and styrene using H_{2}SO_{4}-SiO_{2} as a solid catalyst, with a reaction yield of 89%.

A flask is charged with resorcin, a catalyst and toluene, and the solution is heated to 95 °C (203 °F) before adding styrene. At the end of the reaction, phenylethyl resorcinol is isolated from the catalyst through filtration, cooling and precipitation. Finally, the product is washed and dried twice to purify it.

== Mechanism of action ==
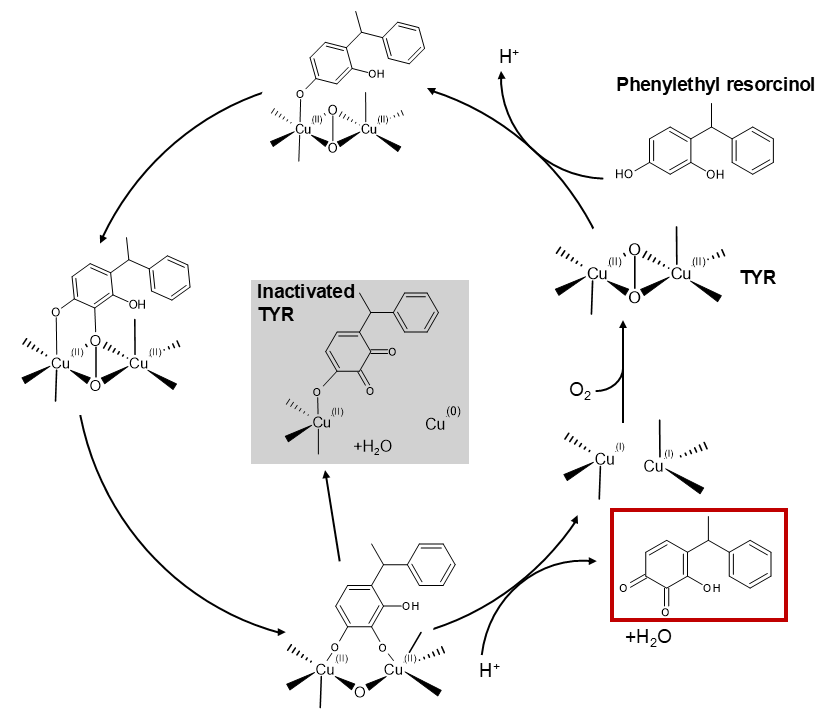
Inactivation of tyrosinase by phenylethyl resorcinol

Resorcinol derivatives, including phenylethyl resorcinol, inhibit tyrosinase through interaction between the -OH groups and the copper metallic centers of the enzyme, resulting in its oxidation at the meta position of the two hydroxyl groups. The phenolic group of phenylethyl resorcinol is thus oxidized at the position 2, and the tyrosinase is inactivated through the separation of its two metallic ions. As a consequence, the reactions catalyzed by the enzyme and enabling the formation of dopaquinone, the precursor of melanin, are stopped. The production of eumelanin and pheomelanin, proteins responsible for skin color, is reduced, which results in skin lightening.

Phenylethyl increases phosphorylation of p44/42 MAPK proteins, which degrade MITF protein, a transcriptional factor increasing the expression of tyrosinase. This degradation inhibits melanogenesis, the process producing melanin.

Phenylethyl resorcinol also has antioxidant properties. More specifically, when the skin is exposed to UV radiation, free radicals can reach the cells and damage the skin. This phenolic compound scavenges and neutralizes them, thus helping against hyperpigmentation and skin aging.

A study observed the antidermatophytic activity of three resorcinol derivatives that are used in dermocosmetics. Two of them showed the ability to inhibit the growth of dermatophytes, with phenylethyl resorcinol being particularly efficient against Microsporum gypseum, meaning that it could potentially be used against dermatomycoses.

== Formulation ==
The irritating properties of phenylethyl resorcinol can be diminished by encapsulating it in vesicles such as liposomes, which prevents direct contact with the skin before penetration. Also, encapsulation could improve its water solubility as well as its photo-stability, as it is not stable under the light. According to a study, using transfersomes and invasomes as transporters improves phenylethyl resorcinol delivery and so its anti-tyrosinase activity associated with skin whitening.

== Applications ==
Phenylethyl resorcinol not only lightens the skin but it also reduces dark pigmentation of facial and armpit hair, and it is 100 times more efficient than β-arbutin, a lightening agent.

With its anti-melanogenic activity, phenylethyl resorcinol could be used as a potential therapeutic agent against hyperpigmentation diseases and skin cancers.

In cosmetics, it is used against dark spots and hyperpigmentation in skin unifying creams, in serums and in masks. Its antioxidant properties are also exploited in anti-wrinkle creams. It can be found in sunscreen to prevent spots due to UV radiation.

Also, it can be associated with different compounds such as vitamin C, niacinamide, kojic acid, glycolic acid or retinoids to enhance its effect. Still, phenylethyl resorcinol is one the most efficient cosmetic substances inhibiting tyrosinase, as its anti-tyrosinase activity is 22 times higher than kojic acid's.

== Marketing ==
The market size of phenylethyl resorcinol is estimated at 150 million dollars in 2022. It is used as a whitening agent in 50% of the concerned cosmetic products. The main companies using phenylethyl resorcinol are Symrise and Chengdu Shengnuo.

== Hazards ==
Although rare, some people can present allergies or skin sensibility to phenylethyl resorcinol. Other symptoms can occur such as skin redness, itching, swelling or rashes. This compound causes irritations at low concentrations, down to 1%. In 2013, a case of contact dermatitis was observed following the use of products containing 1 to 2% of phenylethyl resorcinol, leading to a reconsideration of its percentage amount. Later, in 2021, three other cases of dermatitis appeared after a patch test, with allergic reasons confirmed, similar to the case of 2013.
