= C17H18O5 =

The molecular formula C_{17}H_{18}O_{5}, molar mass: 302.32 g/mol, exact mass: 302.115423686 u, may refer to:

- Diffutidin, a flavan
- Funicin
- Isonotholaenic acid, a dihydrostilbenoid
- Notholaenic acid
- Proxicromil, an antihistamine
