= Isovanillyl alcohol =

Chemical compound

- Skeletal formula of isovanillyl alcohol

Names
- Preferred IUPAC name 5-(hydroxymethyl)-2-methoxyphenol
- Other names: 3-Hydroxy-4-methoxybenzyl alcohol; 4-Methoxy-3-hydroxy benzyl alcohol; Benzenemethanol, 3-hydroxy-4-methoxy-

Identifiers
CAS Number	4383-06-6
3D model (JSmol)	Interactive image
ChEMBL	ChEMBL1738713
ChemSpider	70467
ECHA InfoCard	100.022.264
EC Number	224-489-7
PubChem CID	78089
UNII	FSA5FY5PE7
CompTox Dashboard (EPA)	DTXSID40195949
- InChI: InChI=1S/C8H10O3/c1-11-8-3-2-6(5-9)4-7(8)10/h2-4,9-10H,5H2,1H3 Key: WHKRHBLAJFYZKF-UHFFFAOYSA-N
- SMILES: COC1=C(C=C(C=C1)CO)O

Properties
Chemical formula	C_{8}H_{10}O_{3}
Molar mass	154.165 g·mol^{−1}
- Except where otherwise noted, data are given for materials in their standard state (at 25 °C [77 °F], 100 kPa). Infobox references

Isovanillyl alcohol is an aromatic chemical compound. Its formula is C_{8}H_{10}O_{3}. It is an isomer of vanillyl alcohol, a chemical derived from lignin that is often oxidized to create vanillin, a widely used flavoring and pharmaceutical chemical. Vanillyl alcohol is also an intermediate in the synthesis of biopolymers.

Isovanillyl alcohol is among several organic compounds that have been isolated from the flowers of Cucurbita pepo.

== See also ==
- Isovanillin
