= C24H30O8 =

The molecular formula C_{24}H_{30}O_{8} (molar mass: 446.49 g/mol) may refer to:

- Desaspidin
- Estrone glucuronide
- Filicin, also known as Flavaspidic acid BB
- Merochlorophaeic acid, a depside
