= C41H28O27 =

The molecular formula C_{41}H_{28}O_{27} (molar mass: 952.61 g/mol, exact mass: 952.0818 u) may refer to:

- Geraniin, an ellagitannin
- Granatin B
