= C13H10O5 =

The molecular formula C_{13}H_{10}O_{5} (molar mass: 246.21 g/mol, exact mass: 246.0528 u) may refer to:

- Citromycin
- Hispidin
- Isopimpinellin
