= C22H26O7 =

The molecular formula C_{22}H_{26}O_{7} (molar mass: 402.44 g/mol, exact mass: 402.16785312 u) may refer to:

- Gmelinol, a lignan
- Habenariol, a phenolic compound found in orchids
- L-165041, a PPARδ receptor agonist
