= C7H6O2 =

The molecular formula C_{7}H_{6}O_{2} (molar mass: 122.12 g/mol, exact mass: 122.036779 u) may refer to:

- Benzoic acid
- Phenyl formate
- 1,3-Benzodioxole
- Hydroxybenzaldehyde
  - Salicylaldehyde (2-hydroxybenzaldehyde)
  - 3-Hydroxybenzaldehyde
  - 4-Hydroxybenzaldehyde
- Tropolone
