= C36H22O18 =

The molecular formula C_{36}H_{22}O_{18} (molar mass: 742.52 g/mol, exact mass: 742.0806128 u) may refer to:

- Dieckol, an eckol-type phlorotannin
- 6,6'-Bieckol, an eckol-type phlorotannin
- 8,8′-Bieckol, an eckol-type phlorotannin
