= C16H16O8 =

The molecular formula C_{16}H_{16}O_{8} (molar mass: 336.29 g/mol, exact mass = 336.084517 u) may refer to:

- 4-Caffeoyl-1,5-quinide
- Dactylifric acid
