= C15H10O3 =

The molecular formula C_{15}H_{10}O_{3} (molar mass: 238.24 g/mol, exact mass: 238.0630 u) may refer to:

- 3-hydroxyflavone, a flavonol
- 6-hydroxyflavone, a flavone
