= C17H16O4 =

The molecular formula C_{17}H_{16}O_{4} (exact mass : 284.104859, molar mass : 284.31 g/mol) may refer to:

- Caffeic acid phenethyl ester, a derivative of caffeic acid
- Flavokavain B, a flavokavain found in the kava plant
