= C34H24O22 =

The molecular formula C_{34}H_{24}O_{22} (molar mass: 784.54 g/mol, exact mass: 784.075922 u) may refer to:

- Granatin A, an ellagitannin
- Pedunculagin, an ellagitannin
- Terflavin B, an ellagitannin
