= C18H12O9 =

The molecular formula C_{18}H_{12}O_{9} may refer to:

- Eckol
- Norstictic acid
- Variegatic acid
