= C15H12O2 =

The molecular formula C_{15}H_{12}O_{2} may refer to:

- Dibenzoylmethane
- α-Phenylcinnamic acid
