= C30H18O10 =

The molecular formula C_{30}H_{18}O_{10} (molar mass: 538.46 g/mol, exact mass: 538.0900 u) may refer to:

- Amentoflavone
- Ochnaflavone
