= C10H12O2 =

The molecular formula C_{10}H_{12}O_{2} (molar mass : 164.2 g/mol, exact mass: 164.08373 u) may refer to:

- Chavibetol
- 3,4-Dimethoxystyrene
- Duroquinone
- Eugenol, a phenylpropene
- Isoeugenol, a phenylpropene
- Phenethyl acetate
- Propyl benzoate
- Pseudoisoeugenol
- Raspberry ketone
- Thujaplicins
  - α-Thujaplicin
  - β-Thujaplicin (hinokitiol)
  - γ-Thujaplicin
- Thymoquinone
