= C20H18O10 =

The molecular formula C_{20}H_{18}O_{10} (molar mass: 418.35 g/mol, exact mass: 418.0899968) may refer to:

- 5,3'-Dihydroxy-3,8,4',5'-tetramethoxy-6,7-methylenedioxyflavone (CAS number: 82668-96-0)
- 6-C-beta-D-Xylopyranosylluteolin (CAS number 70059-13-1)
- 8-C-alpha-L-Arabinosylluteolin (CAS number 115636-75-4)
- Isoscutellarein 7-xyloside (CAS number 126771-29-7)
- Juglanin (Kaempferol 3-O-arabinoside, CAS number 5041-67-8)
- Kaempferol 3-alpha-L-arabinopyranoside (CAS number 99882-10-7)
- Kaempferol 3-xyloside (CAS number 60933-78-0)
- Kaempferol 3-alpha-D-arabinopyranoside (CAS number 201533-09-7)
- Kaempferol 7-alpha-L-arabinoside (CAS number 70427-13-3)
- Kaempferol 7-xyloside
- Luteolin 3'-xyloside (CAS number 93078-91-2)
- Luteolin 6-C-alpha-L-arabinopyranoside (CAS number 321690-39-5)
- Luteolin 7-xyloside (CAS number 98575-26-9)
- Salvianolic acid D (CAS number 142998-47-8)
- Scutellarein 6-xyloside (CAS number 65876-68-8)
