= C18H18O2 =

The molecular formula C_{18}H_{18}O_{2} (molar mass 266.33 g/mol, exact mass 266.13068) may refer to:

- Dienestrol, a synthetic estrogen
- 2,8-Dihydroxyhexahydrochrysene, a synthetic estrogen
- Equilenin, a horse steroid
- Honokiol, a lignan
- Juncusol, a 9,10-dihydrophrenathrene found in Juncus species
- Magnolol, a lignan
