= C27H22O18 =

The molecular formula C_{27}H_{22}O_{18} (molar mass: 634,43 g/mol, exact mass: 634.08062 u) may refer to:

- Corilagin, an ellagitannin
- Punicacortein A, an ellagitannin
- Punicacortein B, an ellagitannin
- Strictinin, an ellagitannin
