= C21H22O4 =

The molecular formula C_{21}H_{22}O_{4} (molar mass: 338.39 g/mol, exact mass: 338.1518 u) may refer to:

- Bergamottin, a natural furanocoumarin
- Licochalcone A, a polyphenol
- Taxamairin A
