= C9H10O2 =

The molecular formula C_{9}H_{10}O_{2} (molar mass: 150.18 g/mol, exact mass: 150.06808 u) may refer to:

- Acetanisole
- Benzyl acetate
- Ethyl benzoate
- 4-Hydroxyphenylacetone
- Hydroxychavicol
- 2-Methoxy-4-vinylphenol
- Methyl phenylacetate
- Methyl p-toluate
- Paracoumaryl alcohol
- Paroxypropione
- Phenylacetylcarbinol
- Phenylpropanoic acid
