= C11H10O4 =

The molecular formula C_{11}H_{10}O_{4} may refer to:

- Citropten
- Eugenin
- Polytrimethylene terephthalate (repeating unit)
- Scoparone
