= C10H10O4 =

The molecular formula C_{10}H_{10}O_{4} (molar mass: 194.18 g/mol, exact mass : 194.057909 u) may refer to:

- Dimethyl phthalate
- Dimethyl terephthalate
- Ferulic acid
- 6-Hydroxymellein
- Isoferulic acid
- Methyl caffeate
- Scytalone
