= C21H20O6 =

The molecular formula C_{21}H_{20}O_{6} may refer to:

- Cannflavin B, a prenylflavonoid
- Curcumin, a curcuminoid
- 7-O-Methylluteone, a prenylated isoflavone
