= C18H18O3 =

The molecular formula C_{18}H_{18}O_{3} may refer to:

- Erteberel (SERBA-1), a synthetic, nonsteroidal estrogen which acts as a selective ERβ agonist
- Obovatol, a biphenolic anti-inflammatory, anxiolytic, and nootropic
- SERBA-2, a synthetic, nonsteroidal estrogen which acts as a selective ERβ agonist
