= C22H26O8 =

The molecular formula C_{22}H_{26}O_{8} may refer to:

- Sekikaic acid
- Syringaresinol
