= C11H6O4 =

The molecular formula C_{11}H_{6}O_{4} (molar mass: 202.16 g/mol, exact mass: 202.0266 u) may refer to:

- Bergaptol, a furanocoumarin
- Xanthotoxol, a furanocoumarin
