= Pseudobaptigenin =

- Chemical structure of pseudobaptigenin

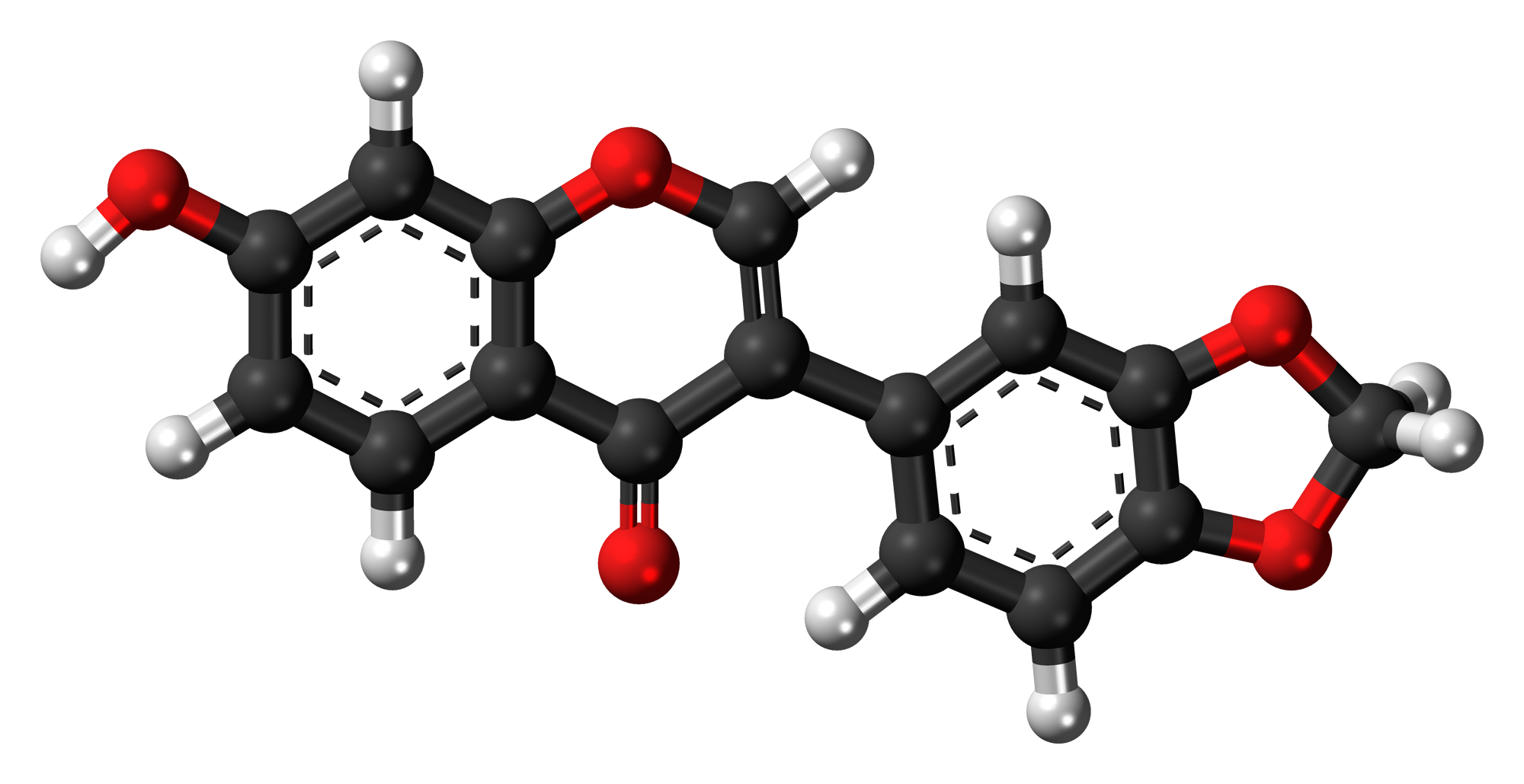

Names
- IUPAC name 7-Hydroxy-3′,4′-[methylenebis(oxy)]isoflavone
- Systematic IUPAC name 3-(2H-1,3-Benzodioxol-5-yl)-7-hydroxy-4H-1-benzopyran-4-one
- Other names ψ-Baptigenin; Psi-baptigenin; 7-Hydroxy-3',4'-methylenedioxyisoflavone; 7-Hydroxy-3', 4'-methylenedioxyisoflavone

Identifiers
CAS Number	90-29-9
3D model (JSmol)	Interactive image
ChEBI	CHEBI:8602
ChEMBL	ChEMBL486176
ChemSpider	4445117
KEGG	C10522
PubChem CID	5281805
UNII	78RRL4HLL9
CompTox Dashboard (EPA)	DTXSID70237982
- InChI: InChI=1S/C16H10O5/c17-10-2-3-11-14(6-10)19-7-12(16(11)18)9-1-4-13-15(5-9)21-8-20-13/h1-7,17H,8H2 Key: KNJNBKINYHZUGC-UHFFFAOYSA-N; InChI=1/C16H10O5/c17-10-2-3-11-14(6-10)19-7-12(16(11)18)9-1-4-13-15(5-9)21-8-20-13/h1-7,17H,8H2 Key: KNJNBKINYHZUGC-UHFFFAOYAK
- SMILES: C1OC2=C(O1)C=C(C=C2)C3=COC4=C(C3=O)C=CC(=C4)O

Properties
Chemical formula	C_{16}H_{10}O_{5}
Molar mass	282.24 g/mol
- Except where otherwise noted, data are given for materials in their standard state (at 25 °C [77 °F], 100 kPa). verify (what is ?) Infobox references

Pseudobaptigenin is an isoflavone, a type of flavonoid. It can be isolated in Trifolium pratense (red clover).
