= C8H10O4 =

The molecular formula C_{8}H_{10}O_{4} (molar mass: 170.16 g/mol, exact mass: 107.0579 u) may refer to:

- Dihydroxyphenylethylene glycol, a phenolic human metabolic
- Penicillic acid
