= C15H18O3 =

The molecular formula C_{15}H_{18}O_{3} may refer to:

- Arglabin, a sesquiterpene lactone
- Irofulven, an experimental antitumor agent
- Loxoprofen, a nonsteroidal anti-inflammatory drug
- Plicatin B, a hydroxycinnamic acid
- Santonin, a drug which was widely used in the past as an anthelminthic
