= C22H23O11 =

The molecular formula C_{22}H_{23}O_{11}, molar mass = 463.41 g/mol (Aglycone), exact mass : 463.124036578 u (C_{22}H_{23}O_{11}^{+} (aglycone), C_{22}H_{23}O_{11}Cl (chloride), 498.9 g/mol (chloride)) may refer to:

- Peonidin-3-O-glucoside
- Pulchellidin 3-rhamnoside
