= C29H36O8 =

The molecular formula C_{29}H_{36}O_{8} (molar mass: 512.59 g/mol, exact mass: 512.2410 u) may refer to:

- Bis-GMA (bisphenol A-glycidyl methacrylate)
- Mallotojaponin C
- Naphthablin
