= C8H8O5 =

The molecular formula C_{8}H_{8}O_{5} (molar mass: 184.14 g/mol, exact mass: 184.0372 u) may refer to:

- 3,4-Dihydroxymandelic acid
- Methyl gallate
