= Fumarin =

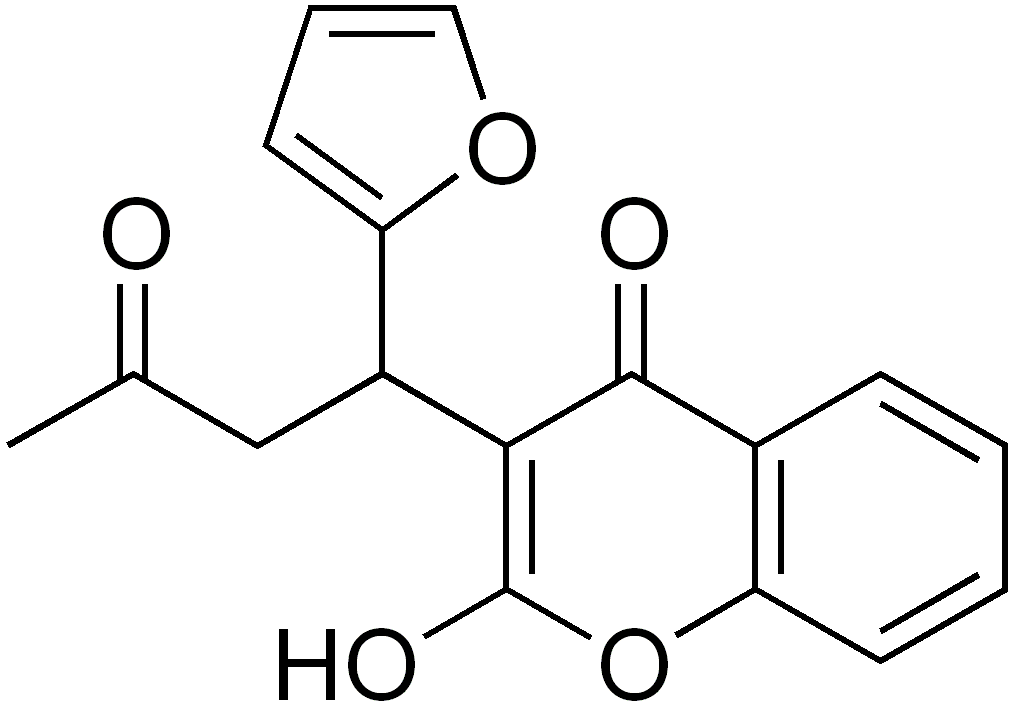

Names
- IUPAC name 3-[1-(2-furyl)-3-oxobutyl]-2-hydroxy-4-chromenone
- Other names Coumafuryl, Ratafin, Fumarine

Identifiers
CAS Number	117-52-2
3D model (JSmol)	Interactive image
ChemSpider	11338519
ECHA InfoCard	100.003.814
EC Number	204-195-5
KEGG	C18599
PubChem CID	54689800
UNII	7ELL4M4VS8
CompTox Dashboard (EPA)	DTXSID3041798
- InChI: InChI=1S/C17H14O5/c1-10(18)9-12(13-7-4-8-21-13)15-16(19)11-5-2-3-6-14(11)22-17(15)20/h2-8,12,19H,9H2,1H3 Key: JFIXKFSJCQNGEK-UHFFFAOYSA-N
- SMILES: CC(=O)CC(c1ccco1)c2c(c3ccccc3oc2=O)O

Properties
Chemical formula	C_{17}H_{14}O_{5}
Molar mass	298.29 g/mol
Density	1.36 g/cm^{3}
Melting point	124
Solubility in water	538 mg/L [20 °C]
log P	1.6

Hazards
Flash point	214.2 °C (417.6 °F; 487.3 K)
- Except where otherwise noted, data are given for materials in their standard state (at 25 °C [77 °F], 100 kPa). Infobox references

Fumarin, also known as coumafuryl, is a coumarin derivative, a structural analog of warfarin. It can be used as rodenticide.
