= C20H22O6 =

The molecular formula C_{20}H_{22}O_{6} (molar mass: 358.38 g/mol, exact mass: 358.1416 u) may refer to:

- Matairesinol, a lignan
- Miroestrol, a phytoestrogen
- Pinoresinol, a lignan
- Triptonide, a chemical compound found in Tripterygium wilfordii
