= Theogallin =

- Chemical structure of theogallin

Names
- Preferred IUPAC name (1S,3R,4R,5R)-1,3,4-Trihydroxy-5-[(3,4,5-trihydroxybenzoyl)oxy]cyclohexane-1-carboxylic acid
- Other names 3-O-Galloylquinic acid

Identifiers
CAS Number	17365-11-6
3D model (JSmol)	Interactive image
ChEBI	CHEBI:9522
ChemSpider	391291
PubChem CID	442988
UNII	N8GTS57R32
CompTox Dashboard (EPA)	DTXSID60332031
- InChI: InChI=1S/C14H16O10/c15-6-1-5(2-7(16)10(6)18)12(20)24-9-4-14(23,13(21)22)3-8(17)11(9)19/h1-2,8-9,11,15-19,23H,3-4H2,(H,21,22)/t8-,9-,11-,14+/m1/s1 Key: LDPLFHGGZNSKDS-FTBFGRRBSA-N
- SMILES: O=C(O)[C@]2(O)C[C@@H](O)[C@@H](O)[C@H](OC(=O)c1cc(O)c(O)c(O)c1)C2

Properties
Chemical formula	C_{14}H_{16}O_{10}
Molar mass	344.27 g/mol
- Except where otherwise noted, data are given for materials in their standard state (at 25 °C [77 °F], 100 kPa). verify (what is ?) Infobox references

Theogallin is a gallic acid glycoside, a type of polyphenolic compound found in tea where it has been characterised as an umami enhancing compound. The compound can also be found in Arbutus unedo fruits.

In rats, theogallin, or its metabolite quinic acid, can move through the blood brain barrier and can have cognition enhancing activities.
