= C7H8O =

The molecular formula C_{7}H_{8}O (molar mass: 108.13 g/mol, exact mass: 108.057515 u) may refer to:

- Anisole
- Benzyl alcohol
- Cresols
  - o-Cresol
  - m-Cresol
  - p-Cresol

Also possible hetero aromatic compounds containing oxygen(5 membered rings)
