= Taxadienone =

Names
- IUPAC name Taxa-4,11-dien-2-one
- Systematic IUPAC name (4aS,6R,12aS)-4,9,12a,13,13-Pentamethyl-2,4a,6,7,8,11,12,12a-octahydro-6,10-methanobenzo[10]annulen-5(1H)-one

Identifiers
CAS Number	1350704-09-4
3D model (JSmol)	Interactive image
ChemSpider	26325062
PubChem CID	53389291
CompTox Dashboard (EPA)	DTXSID501032118
- InChI: InChI=1S/C20H30O/c1-13-8-9-16-18(21)17-14(2)7-6-11-20(17,5)12-10-15(13)19(16,3)4/h7,16-17H,6,8-12H2,1-5H3/t16-,17-,20-/m0/s1 Key: FNHWZFUZPRGYAH-ZWOKBUDYSA-N
- SMILES: [H][C@]12CCC(C)=C(CC[C@]3(C)CCC=C(C)[C@@]3([H])C1=O)C2(C)C

Properties
Chemical formula	C_{20}H_{30}O
Molar mass	286.459 g·mol^{−1}
- Except where otherwise noted, data are given for materials in their standard state (at 25 °C [77 °F], 100 kPa). Infobox references

Taxadienone ((+)-taxa-4(5),11(12)-dien-2-one) is an organic compound and a taxane. The compound is of some academic interest as a potential precursor to Taxol, in important anti-cancer drug, in a commercially viable process. A total synthesis of taxadienone was reported in 2012 together with its conversion to the next Taxol precursor taxadiene. A multigram synthetic method was reported in 2015.
