= C22H18O11 =

The molecular formula C_{22}H_{18}O_{11} (molar mass: 458.37 g/mol, exact mass: 458.084911) may refer to:

- Epigallocatechin gallate (EGCG), a flavanol found in green tea
- Gallocatechin gallate (GCG), an epimer of EGCG formed in high temperature
