= 3,4-Divanillyltetrahydrofuran =

Names
- IUPAC name 3,3′-Dimethoxy-9,9′-epoxylignane-4,4′-diol
- Systematic IUPAC name 4,4′-[Oxolane-3,4-diylbis(methylene)]bis(2-methoxyphenol)
- Other names 3,4-Divanilyltetrahydrofuran; α,α'-(Tetrahydro-3,4-furandiyl)dicreosol

Identifiers
CAS Number	34730-78-4
3D model (JSmol)	Interactive image
ChEMBL	ChEMBL405043
ChemSpider	158474
PubChem CID	182210
CompTox Dashboard (EPA)	DTXSID20956217
- InChI: InChI=1S/C20H24O5/c1-23-19-9-13(3-5-17(19)21)7-15-11-25-12-16(15)8-14-4-6-18(22)20(10-14)24-2/h3-6,9-10,15-16,21-22H,7-8,11-12H2,1-2H3 Key: ROGUIJKVZZROIQ-UHFFFAOYSA-N; InChI=1/C20H24O5/c1-23-19-9-13(3-5-17(19)21)7-15-11-25-12-16(15)8-14-4-6-18(22)20(10-14)24-2/h3-6,9-10,15-16,21-22H,7-8,11-12H2,1-2H3 Key: ROGUIJKVZZROIQ-UHFFFAOYAP
- SMILES: Oc1ccc(cc1OC)CC3COCC3Cc2cc(OC)c(O)cc2

Properties
Chemical formula	C_{20}H_{24}O_{5}
Molar mass	344.40 g/mol
- Except where otherwise noted, data are given for materials in their standard state (at 25 °C [77 °F], 100 kPa). verify (what is ?) Infobox references

3,4-Divanillyltetrahydrofuran is a lignan found in an Urtica dioica (stinging nettle) subspecies. This same compound may also be found in other lignan-containing plant sources such as Linum usitatissimum (flax seed).

The compound has been found to occupy binding sites of sex hormone-binding globulin (SHBG), thereby reducing the ability of SHBG to bind additional steroid hormones such as estrogens and androgens, mostly testosterone and estradiol. Certain extracts of stinging nettle are therefore used by some bodybuilders in an effort to increase free testosterone.
