= Petunidin-3-O-glucoside =

Names
- IUPAC name (2S,3R,4S,5S,6R)-2-[2-(3,4-dihydroxy-5-methoxyphenyl)-5,7-dihydroxychromenylium-3-yl]oxy-6-(hydroxymethyl)oxane-3,4,5-triol
- Other names Petunidin-3-glucoside; Petunidin 3-O-glucoside; Petunidin 3-O-β-glucopyranoside

Identifiers
| CAS Number | 6988-81-4 (chloride) |
| 3D model (JSmol) | Interactive image |
| ChEBI | CHEBI:31985 |
| ChemSpider | 391784 |
| KEGG | C12139 |
| PubChem CID | 443651 |
| UNII | AA9G36JBHT (chloride) |
| CompTox Dashboard (EPA) | DTXSID40990158 |
- InChI: InChI=1S/C22H22O12/c1-31-14-3-8(2-12(26)17(14)27)21-15(6-10-11(25)4-9(24)5-13(10)32-21)33-22-20(30)19(29)18(28)16(7-23)34-22/h2-6,16,18-20,22-23,28-30H,7H2,1H3,(H3-,24,25,26,27)/p+1/t16-,18-,19+,20-,22-/m1/s1 Key: CCQDWIRWKWIUKK-QKYBYQKWSA-O
- SMILES: COC1=CC(=CC(=C1O)O)C2=C(C=C3C(=CC(=CC3=[O+]2)O)O)OC4C(C(C(C(O4)CO)O)O)O

Properties
| Chemical formula | C_{22}H_{23}O^{+}_{12} C_{22}H_{23}O_{12}Cl (chloride) |
| Molar mass | 479.41 g/mol, 514.86 g/mol (chloride) |
- Except where otherwise noted, data are given for materials in their standard state (at 25 °C [77 °F], 100 kPa). Infobox references

Petunidin-3-O-glucoside is anthocyanin. It is found in fruits and berries, in red Vitis vinifera grapes and red wine.

== See also ==
- Phenolic compounds in wine
