= (R)-Ketoprofen =

Clinical data
- Routes of administration: Oral

Legal status
- Legal status: Investigational

Identifiers
- IUPAC name: (2R)-2-(3-benzoylphenyl)propanoic acid
- CAS Number: 56105-81-8
- PubChem CID: 180540
- DrugBank: DB09214
- ChemSpider: 157105
- UNII: S03709D0TH
- ChEMBL: ChEMBL372052
- CompTox Dashboard (EPA): DTXSID50204652

Chemical and physical data
- Formula: C_{16}H_{14}O_{3}
- Molar mass: 254.285 g·mol^{−1}
- 3D model (JSmol): Interactive image
- SMILES: C[C@H](C1=CC(=CC=C1)C(=O)C2=CC=CC=C2)C(=O)O
- InChI: InChI=InChI=1S/C16H14O3/c1-11(16(18)19)13-8-5-9-14(10-13)15(17)12-6-3-2-4-7-12/h2-11H,1H3,(H,18,19)/t11-/m1/s1; Key:DKYWVDODHFEZIM-LLVKDONJSA-N

(R)-Ketoprofen (also called R(-)-ketoprofen) is the optically pure R-enantiomer of the NSAID ketoprofen. It functions as a cyclooxygenase inhibitor and has been investigated for potential use in conditions including tinnitus and neuropathic pain, although it is not approved for these indications.

== Background and development ==
This method for treating tinnitus includes administration of substantially optically pure R(-)-ketoprofen.

== Mechanism of action ==
As with other NSAIDs, R-ketoprofen inhibits the cyclooxygenase enzymes, thereby reducing the production of prostaglandins, which mediate inflammation, pain and potentially neurogenic processes. Its proposed application in tinnitus stems from the hypothesis that inflammatory or prostaglandin-mediated mechanisms might contribute to cochlear or auditory pathway dysfunction-associated tinnitus.

Furthermore, the patent includes the statement that R-ketoprofen may be used in "methods of treating or preventing tinnitus or ringing in the ear" including conditions such as acoustic trauma, ototoxicity, cardiovascular diseases causing hearing loss.

== Investigational indications ==
=== Tinnitus ===
The patent application discloses R-ketoprofen for the treatment or prevention of tinnitus.

=== Neuropathic pain ===
The development overview also mentions "Phase-II for Neuropathic pain in USA (PO)" for R-ketoprofen. As of the last available update 2003, no further progression in trial reporting is publicly documented.
