= C45H38O18 =

The molecular formula C_{45}H_{38}O_{18} (molar mass: 866.77 g/mol, exact mass: 866.205814 u) may refer to:

- Arecatannin B1, a condensed tannin found in the betel nut
- Procyanidin C1, a condensed tannin found in grape
- Procyanidin C2, a condensed tannin found in grape and barley
