= C20H22O8 =

The molecular formula C_{20}H_{22}O_{8} (molar mass: 390.38 g/mol, exact mass: 390.131468 u) may refer to:

- Piceid (resveratrol-3-O-β-D-glucopyranoside), a stilbenoid
- Populin, a glucoside
- Resveratroloside (resveratrol-4'-O-β-D-glucopyranoside), a stilbenoid
