= C41H28O26 =

The molecular formula C_{41}H_{28}O_{26} (molar mass: 936.64 g/mol, exact mass: 936.086881 u) may refer to:

- Casuarictin
- Casuarinin
