= 5-Hydroxyferulic acid =

Names
- Preferred IUPAC name (2E)-3-(3,4-Dihydroxy-5-methoxyphenyl)prop-2-enoic acid

Identifiers
CAS Number	trans (2E): 110642-42-7; cis&trans: 1782-55-4
3D model (JSmol)	trans (2E): Interactive image; cis&trans: Interactive image; cis: Interactive image
ChEBI	trans (2E): CHEBI:20582
ChemSpider	trans (2E): 394087
ECHA InfoCard	100.230.072
EC Number	cis&trans: 803-254-8
PubChem CID	trans (2E): 446834
UNII	trans (2E): R3LZY3E4HE
CompTox Dashboard (EPA)	trans (2E): DTXSID001347297
- InChI: InChI=1S/C10H10O5/c1-15-8-5-6(2-3-9(12)13)4-7(11)10(8)14/h2-5,11,14H,1H3,(H,12,13)/b3-2+ Key: YFXWTVLDSKSYLW-NSCUHMNNSA-N; trans (2E): InChI=1/C10H10O5/c1-15-8-5-6(2-3-9(12)13)4-7(11)10(8)14/h2-5,11,14H,1H3,(H,12,13)/b3-2+ Key: YFXWTVLDSKSYLW-NSCUHMNNBP
- SMILES: trans (2E): O=C(O)\C=C\c1cc(O)c(O)c(OC)c1; cis&trans: O=C(O)C=Cc1cc(O)c(O)c(OC)c1; cis: O=C(O)\C=C/c1cc(O)c(O)c(OC)c1

Properties
Chemical formula	C_{10}H_{10}O_{5}
Molar mass	210.18 g/mol
- Except where otherwise noted, data are given for materials in their standard state (at 25 °C [77 °F], 100 kPa). Infobox references

5-Hydroxyferulic acid is a hydroxycinnamic acid.

It is a precursor in the biosynthesis of sinapic acid. Phenylalanine is first converted to cinnamic acid by the action of the enzyme phenylalanine ammonia-lyase (PAL). A series of enzymatic hydroxylations and methylations leads to coumaric acid, caffeic acid, ferulic acid, 5-hydroxyferulic acid and sinapic acid.

Thus 5-hydroxyferulic acid is formed from ferulic acid by the action of the specific enzyme ferulate 5-hydroxylase (F5H).
