= C9H12O2 =

The molecular formula C_{9}H_{12}O_{2} (molar mass: 152.18 g/mol, exact mass: 152.0837 u) may refer to:

- Cumene hydroperoxide (CHP)
- 4-Ethylguaiacol
- Lanierone
