= Tangshenoside I =

Chemical compound

Identifiers
| CAS Number | 117278-74-7 |
| 3D model (JSmol) | Interactive image |
| ChemSpider | 4945396 |
| PubChem CID | 6441191 |
| UNII | 9WKT543Z4X |
- InChI: InChI=1S/C29H42O18/c1-29(9-18(32)33,47-28-25(40)23(38)21(36)17(12-31)45-28)10-19(34)43-6-4-5-13-7-14(41-2)26(15(8-13)42-3)46-27-24(39)22(37)20(35)16(11-30)44-27/h4-5,7-8,16-17,20-25,27-28,30-31,35-40H,6,9-12H2,1-3H3,(H,32,33)/b5-4+/t16-,17-,20-,21-,22+,23+,24-,25-,27+,28+,29?/m1/s1 Key: ABKPQICIFGNRAA-YCRPTBBLSA-N; InChI=1/C29H42O18/c1-29(9-18(32)33,47-28-25(40)23(38)21(36)17(12-31)45-28)10-19(34)43-6-4-5-13-7-14(41-2)26(15(8-13)42-3)46-27-24(39)22(37)20(35)16(11-30)44-27/h4-5,7-8,16-17,20-25,27-28,30-31,35-40H,6,9-12H2,1-3H3,(H,32,33)/b5-4+/t16-,17-,20-,21-,22+,23+,24-,25-,27+,28+,29?/m1/s1 Key: ABKPQICIFGNRAA-YCRPTBBLBT
- SMILES: CC(CC(=O)O)(CC(=O)OC/C=C/c1cc(c(c(c1)OC)O[C@H]2[C@@H]([C@H]([C@@H]([C@H](O2)CO)O)O)O)OC)O[C@H]3[C@@H]([C@H]([C@@H]([C@H](O3)CO)O)O)O

Properties
| Chemical formula | C_{29}H_{42}O_{18} |
| Molar mass | 678.637 g·mol^{−1} |
- Except where otherwise noted, data are given for materials in their standard state (at 25 °C [77 °F], 100 kPa). Infobox references

Tangshenoside I is a chemical compound isolated from Codonopsis pilosula. It can be considered a syringin molecule bound to meglutol glucoside.
