= C21H22O10 =

The molecular formula C_{21}H_{22}O_{10} (molar mass: 434.393 g/mol, exact mass: 434.1213 u) may refer to:

- Engeletin
- Prunin
