= C20H20O8 =

The molecular formula C_{20}H_{20}O_{8} may refer to:

- Combretol
- 3-O-Methylfunicone
