= Dihydroactinidiolide =

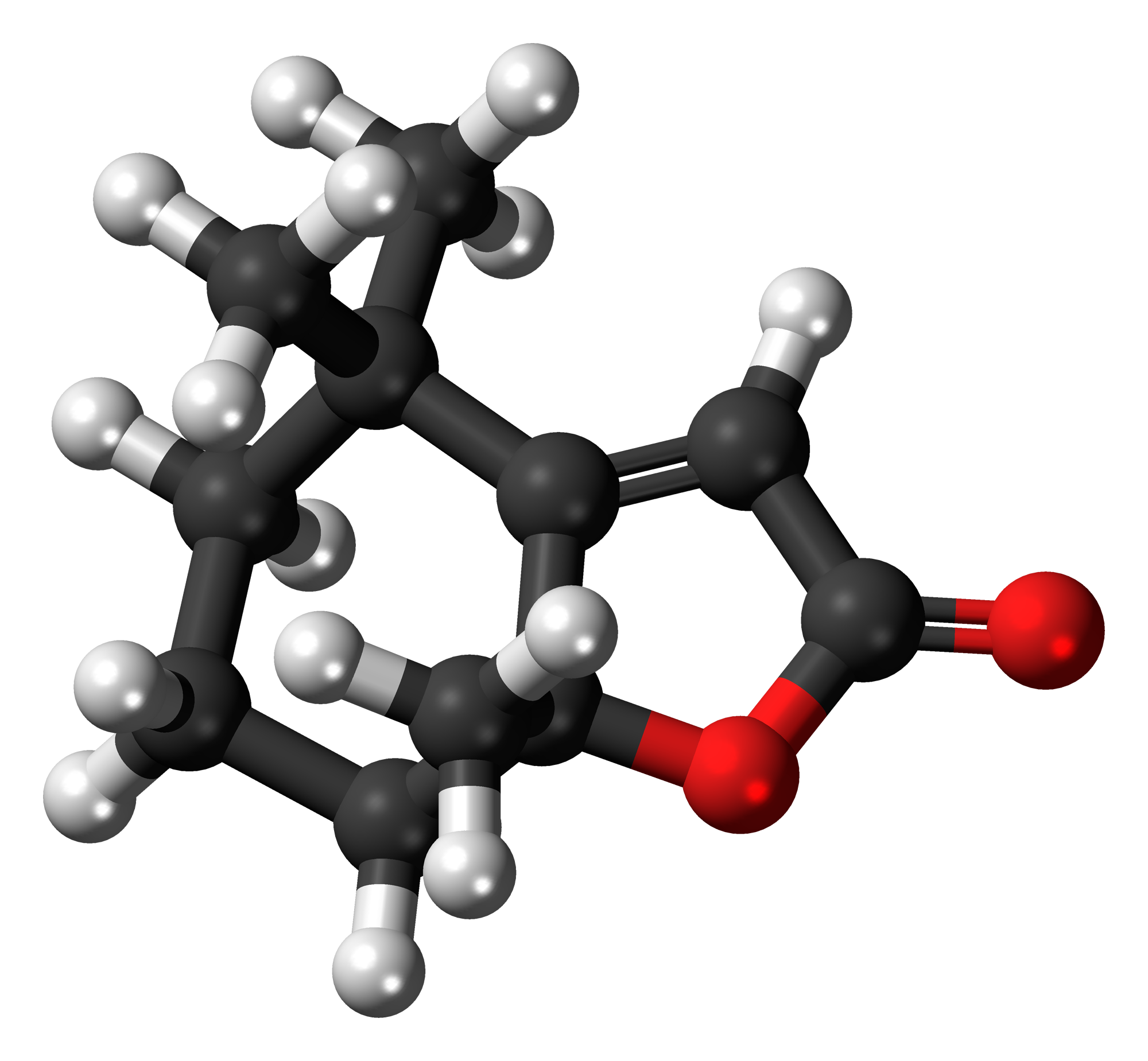

Names
- Preferred IUPAC name (7aR)-4,4,7a-Trimethyl-5,6,7,7a-tetrahydro-1-benzofuran-2(4H)-one
- Other names Dihydroactinidiolide

Identifiers
CAS Number	17092-92-1
3D model (JSmol)	Interactive image; Interactive image
ChemSpider	4937432
ECHA InfoCard	100.169.249
PubChem CID	6432173
UNII	O3M4862R3R
CompTox Dashboard (EPA)	DTXSID801028845
- InChI: InChI=1S/C11H16O2/c1-10(2)5-4-6-11(3)8(10)7-9(12)13-11/h7H,4-6H2,1-3H3/t11-/m1/s1 Key: IMKHDCBNRDRUEB-LLVKDONJSA-N; InChI=1/C11H16O2/c1-10(2)5-4-6-11(3)8(10)7-9(12)13-11/h7H,4-6H2,1-3H3/t11-/m1/s1 Key: IMKHDCBNRDRUEB-LLVKDONJBM
- SMILES: O=C2O[C@]1(C)CCCC(C)(C)C1=C2; O=C\1O[C@]2(/C(=C/1)C(CCC2)(C)C)C

Properties
Chemical formula	C_{11}H_{16}O_{2}
Molar mass	180.24 g/mol

Hazards
- GHS labelling
Pictograms	(GHS06: Toxic)
Signal word	Danger
Hazard statements	H300
Precautionary statements	P264, P270, P301+P316, P321, P330, P405, P501
- Lethal dose or concentration (LD, LC)
LD_{50} (median dose)	49 mg/kg 3.468 mg/kg (oral, mouse)
- Except where otherwise noted, data are given for materials in their standard state (at 25 °C [77 °F], 100 kPa). verify (what is ?) Infobox references

Dihydroactinidiolide is a toxic volatile terpene. It has a sweet, tea-like odor and is used as a fragrance. Dihydroactinidiolide occurs naturally in black tea, fenugreek, fire ants, mangoes, and tobacco. It has also been prepared synthetically.

Dihydroactinidiolide is a pheromone for a variety of insects; for example, it is one of the three components of the pheromone for queen recognition of the workers of the red fire ant.
