= C21H22O5 =

The molecular formula C_{21}H_{22}O_{5} (molar mass: 354.39 g/mol, exact mass: 354.146724 u) may refer to:

- Xanthohumol, a prenylated chalconoid
- Isoxanthohumol, a prenylated flavanone
