= C13H14O4 =

The molecular formula C_{13}H_{14}O_{4} (molar mass: 234.25 g/mol, exact mass: 234.089209 u) may refer to:

- Sclerin, a metabolite of the plant fungus Sclerotinia sclerotiorum
- Vidalenolone, a metabolite of Indonesian red algae in the genus Vidalia
- Aloesol, a plant product found in the genus Rheum
- Artemidiol, an isocoumarin found in the roots of the herb tarragon
