= C15H18O8 =

The molecular formula C_{15}H_{18}O_{8} (molar mass: 326.29 g/mol, exact mass: 326.100168 u) may refer to:

- Bilobalide, a terpenic trilactone present in Ginkgo biloba
- p-Coumaric acid glucoside a hydroxycinnamic acid found in commercial breads containing flaxseed
