= Luteone (isoflavone) =

- Chemical structure of luteone

Names
- IUPAC name 2′,4′,5,7-Tetrahydroxy-6-(3-methylbut-2-en-1-yl)isoflavone
- Systematic IUPAC name 3-(2,4-Dihydroxyphenyl)-5,7-dihydroxy-6-(3-methylbut-2-en-1-yl)-4H-1-benzopyran-4-one
- Other names Ruizgenin

Identifiers
CAS Number	41743-56-0
3D model (JSmol)	Interactive image
ChEBI	CHEBI:27917
ChEMBL	ChEMBL549617
ChemSpider	4445109
KEGG	C10498
PubChem CID	5281797
UNII	FU3E0232IF
CompTox Dashboard (EPA)	DTXSID00194574
- InChI: InChI=1S/C20H18O6/c1-10(2)3-5-13-16(23)8-17-18(19(13)24)20(25)14(9-26-17)12-6-4-11(21)7-15(12)22/h3-4,6-9,21-24H,5H2,1-2H3 Key: MMPVAPMCVABQPS-UHFFFAOYSA-N
- SMILES: CC(=CCC1=C(C=C2C(=C1O)C(=O)C(=CO2)C3=C(C=C(C=C3)O)O)O)C

Properties
Chemical formula	C_{20}H_{18}O_{6}
Molar mass	354.358 g·mol^{−1}
- Except where otherwise noted, data are given for materials in their standard state (at 25 °C [77 °F], 100 kPa). verify (what is ?) Infobox references

Luteone is a prenylated isoflavone, a type of flavonoid. It can be found in the pods of Laburnum anagyroides and can be synthesized.
