= C16H14O2 =

The molecular formula C_{16}H_{14}O_{2} (molar mass: 238.28 g/mol, exact mass: 238.09938 u) may refer to:

- Benzyl cinnamate
- Methyl hydroxychalcone (MCHP)
