= C15H14O3 =

The molecular formula C_{15}H_{14}O_{3} (molar mass : 242.26 g/mol, exact mass: 242.094294) may refer to:

- Equol, an isoflavandiol
- Fenoprofen, a nonsteroidal anti-inflammatory drug
- Lapachol
- Leucoanthocyanidin
- 4-Methoxyresveratrol, a stilbenoid
- Mexenone
- Pinostilbene (3-methoxyresveratrol), a stilbenoid
- Taraxacin a guaianolide
