= C16H10O6 =

The molecular formula C_{16}H_{10}O_{6} (molar mass: 298.24 g/mol, exact mass: 298.0477 u) may refer to:

- Irilone
- Fallacinal
