= Ramalic acid =

Names
- IUPAC name 2-Hydroxy-4-(2-hydroxy-4-methoxy-3,6-dimethylbenzoyl)oxy-6-methylbenzoic acid

Identifiers
CAS Number	500-37-8
3D model (JSmol)	Interactive image
ChEBI	CHEBI:144283
ChemSpider	4478841
PubChem CID	5320886
CompTox Dashboard (EPA)	DTXSID401143770
- InChI: InChI=1S/C18H18O7/c1-8-5-11(7-12(19)14(8)17(21)22)25-18(23)15-9(2)6-13(24-4)10(3)16(15)20/h5-7,19-20H,1-4H3,(H,21,22) Key: GEZCJRBINSDUSC-UHFFFAOYSA-N
- SMILES: Cc1cc(cc(c1C(=O)O)O)OC(=O)c2c(cc(c(c2O)C)OC)C

Properties
Chemical formula	C_{18}H_{18}O_{7}
Molar mass	346.335 g·mol^{−1}
- Except where otherwise noted, data are given for materials in their standard state (at 25 °C [77 °F], 100 kPa). Infobox references

Ramalic acid is an organic compound of the depside class with the molecular formula C_{18}H_{18}O_{7}. Ramalic acid occurs as a secondary metabolite in some lichens like Ramalina pollinaria wherefrom ramalic acid has its name. Ramalic acid can be used as a dye.
