= C14H12O4 =

The molecular formula C_{14}H_{12}O_{4} (molar mass: 244.25 g/mol, exact mass: 244.073559 u) may refer to:

- Dioxybenzone (benzophenone-8), an organic compound used in sunscreen
- Oxyresveratrol, a stilbenoid
- Piceatannol, a stilbenoid
