= Phenylpropiolic acid =

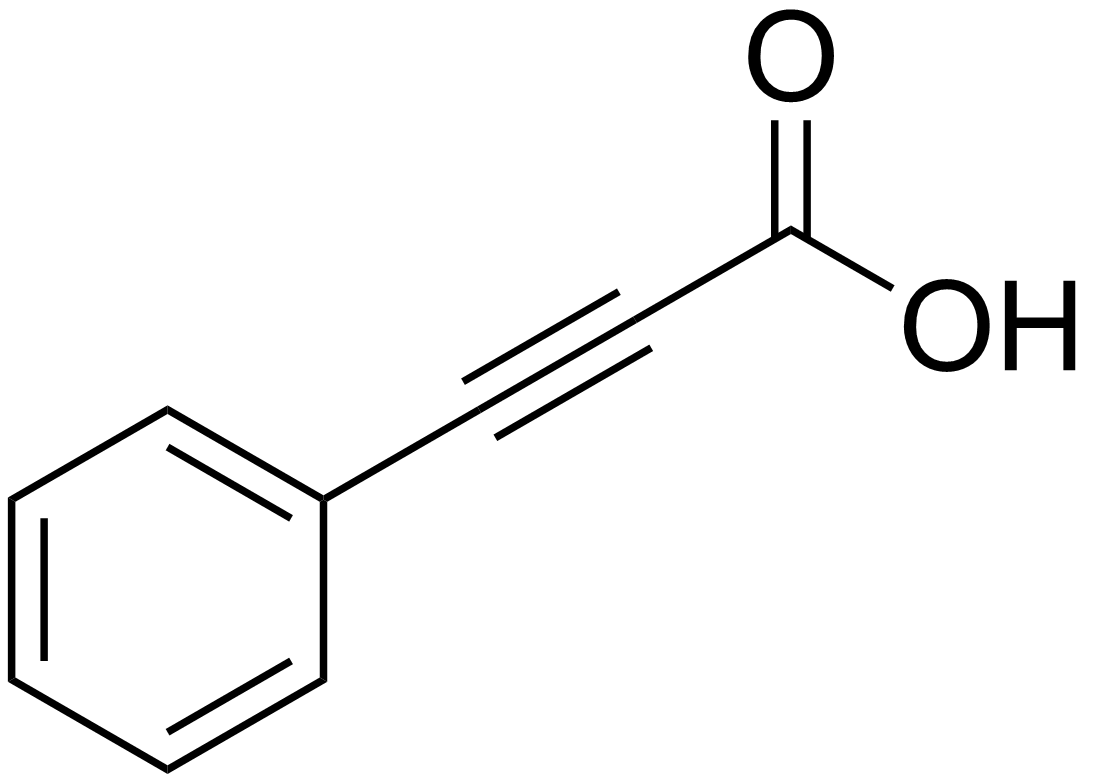
- Skeletal formula of phenylpropiolic acid

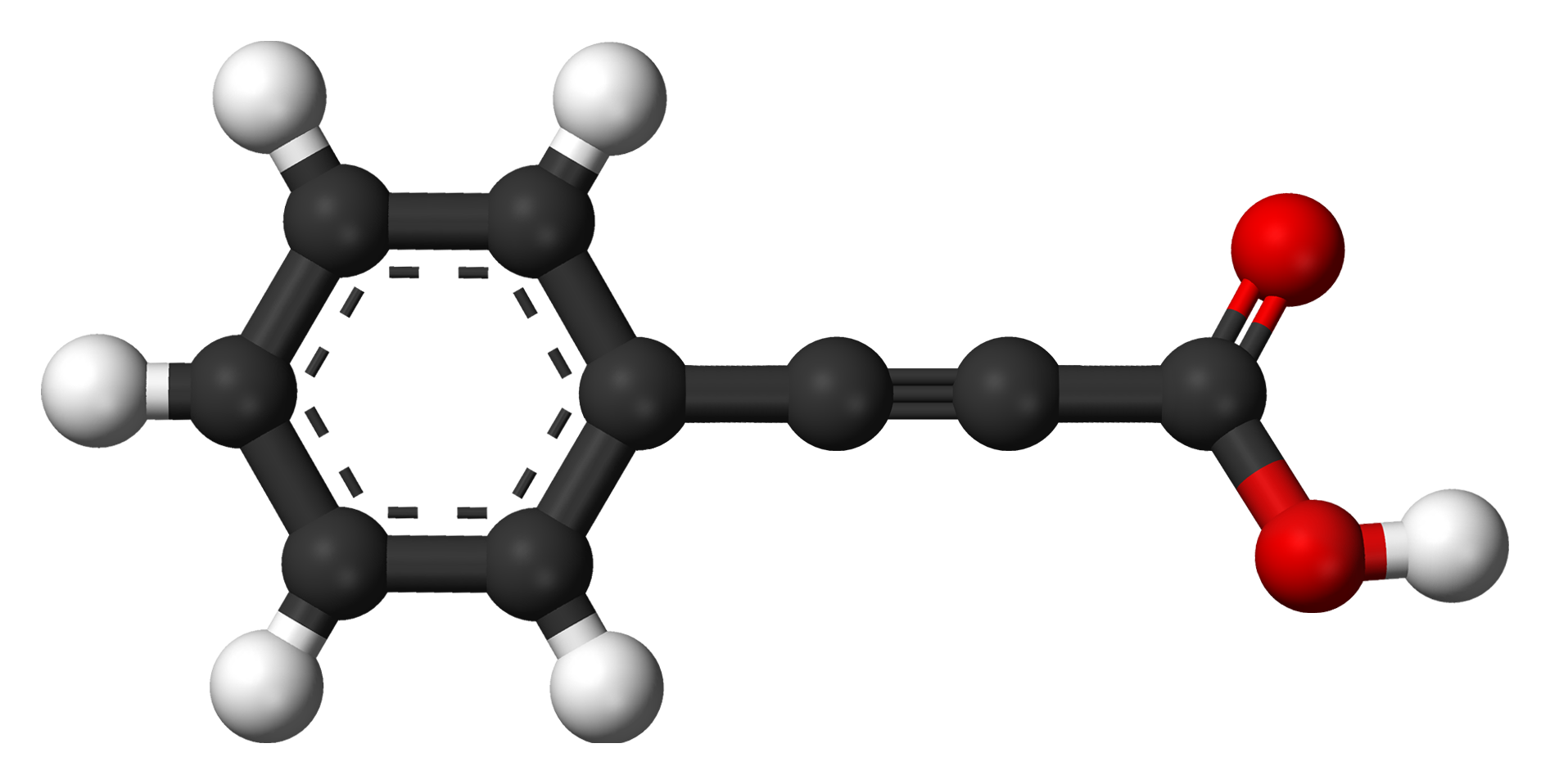
- Ball-and-stick model

Names
- Preferred IUPAC name 3-Phenylprop-2-ynoic acid
- Other names Phenylpropynoic acid; Phenylpropiolic acid

Identifiers
CAS Number	637-44-5
3D model (JSmol)	Interactive image
ChEBI	CHEBI:90355
ChemSpider	62682
ECHA InfoCard	100.010.260
PubChem CID	69475
UNII	4KE28XZ9GX
CompTox Dashboard (EPA)	DTXSID7060918
- InChI: InChI=1S/C9H6O2/c10-9(11)7-6-8-4-2-1-3-5-8/h1-5H,(H,10,11) Key: XNERWVPQCYSMLC-UHFFFAOYSA-N; InChI=1/C9H6O2/c10-9(11)7-6-8-4-2-1-3-5-8/h1-5H,(H,10,11) Key: XNERWVPQCYSMLC-UHFFFAOYAX
- SMILES: O=C(C#Cc1ccccc1)O

Properties
Chemical formula	C_{9}H_{6}O_{2}
Molar mass	146.14 g/mol
Melting point	135 to 137 °C (275 to 279 °F; 408 to 410 K)
- Except where otherwise noted, data are given for materials in their standard state (at 25 °C [77 °F], 100 kPa). verify (what is ?) Infobox references

Phenylpropiolic acid, C_{6}H_{5}CCCO_{2}H, formed by the action of alcoholic potash on cinnamic acid dibromide, C_{6}H_{5}CHBrCHBrCO_{2}H, crystallizes in long needles or prisms which melt at 136–137 °C. When heated with water to 120 °C, it yields phenylacetylene (C_{6}H_{5}CCH). Chromic acid oxidizes it to benzoic acid; zinc and acetic acid reduce it to cinnamic acid, C_{6}H_{5}CH=CHCO_{2}H, whilst sodium amalgam reduces it to hydrocinnamic acid, C_{6}H_{5}CH_{2}CH_{2}CO_{2}H. Ortho-nitrophenylpropiolic acid, NO_{2}C_{6}H_{4}CCCO_{2}H, prepared by the action of alcoholic potash on ortho-nitrocinnamic acid dibromide, crystallizes in needles which decompose when heated to 155–156 °C. It is readily converted into indigo.
