= C21H34O2 =

The molecular formula C_{21}H_{34}O_{2} (molar mass : 318.49 g/mol, exact mass : 318.25588) may refer to:

- Allopregnanolone, a neurosteroid
- Bilobol, an alkylresorcinol found in Ginkgo biloba fruits
- BSPP, a drug
- CP 47,497, an agonist of cannabinoid receptor
- Epipregnanolone
- Isopregnanolone
- Methasterone, an anabolic steroid
- Pregnanolone, a neurosteroid
