= C34H22O22 =

The molecular formula C_{34}H_{22}O_{22} (molar mass: 782.52 g/mol, exact mass: 782.060272 u) may refer to:

- Punicalin, an ellagitannin found in pomegranates
- 4,6-isoterchébuloyl-D-glucose, an ellagitannin found in Terminalia macroptera
