= C14H12O3 =

The molecular formula C_{14}H_{12}O_{3} (molar mass: 228.25 g/mol, exact mass: 228.078644 u) may refer to:

- Benzilic acid
- Benzyl salicylate
- Desmethoxyyangonin, a kavalactone
- Oxybenzone
- Resveratrol
- Trioxsalen
