= C30H26O13 =

The molecular formula C_{30}H_{26}O_{13} (molar mass: 594.52 g/mol, exact mass: 594.137340 u) may refer to:

- Prodelphinidin B3 (gallocatechin-(4α→8)-catechin), a condensed tannin
- Prodelphinidin B9 (epigallocatechin-(4α→8)-catechin), a condensed tannin
