= C20H18O4 =

The molecular formula C_{20}H_{18}O_{4} may refer to:

- Glabrene, an isoflavonoid that is found in Glycyrrhiza glabra (licorice)
- Phaseolin (pterocarpan), a prenylated pterocarpan found in French bean (Phaseolus vulgaris) seeds and in the stems of Erythrina subumbrans
