= C15H16O9 =

The molecular formula C_{15}H_{16}O_{9} (molar mass: 340.28 g/mol, exact mass: 340.0794 u) may refer to:

- Aesculin (esculin), a coumarin
- Daphnin, a coumarin
