= Methacrylic anhydride =

Names
- Preferred IUPAC name 2-Methylprop-2-enoic anhydride
- Other names Methacrylic anhydride

Identifiers
CAS Number	760-93-0
3D model (JSmol)	Interactive image
ChemSpider	12434
ECHA InfoCard	100.010.986
PubChem CID	12974
UNII	N2RJR03340
CompTox Dashboard (EPA)	DTXSID60862404
- InChI: InChI=1S/C8H10O3/c1-5(2)7(9)11-8(10)6(3)4/h1,3H2,2,4H3 Key: DCUFMVPCXCSVNP-UHFFFAOYSA-N; InChI=1/C8H10O3/c1-5(2)7(9)11-8(10)6(3)4/h1,3H2,2,4H3 Key: DCUFMVPCXCSVNP-UHFFFAOYAX
- SMILES: O=C(OC(=O)\C(=C)C)\C(=C)C

Properties
Chemical formula	C_{8}H_{10}O_{3}
Molar mass	154.165 g·mol^{−1}
Density	1.035 g/cm^{3}
Boiling point	87 °C/13 mmHg
- Except where otherwise noted, data are given for materials in their standard state (at 25 °C [77 °F], 100 kPa). Infobox references

Methacrylic anhydride is a liquid which reacts with water exothermically.

It can also react with hydroxyl and amino groups present in some organic compounds leading to covalent attachment of methacryloyl moieties. These functional groups could be successfully used either in subsequent polymerisation or reactions with thiols. For example, chitosan modified by methacryloylation exhibits better ability to adhere to mucosal surfaces (mucoadhesion) due to its reactivity with thiols groups present in cysteine domains of mucins.

== Uses ==
Methacrylic anhydride is used as an intermediate agent in plastics, material, and resin manufacturing.
