= C16H18O9 =

The molecular formula C_{16}H_{18}O_{9} may refer to:

- Chlorogenic acid (3-O-caffeoylquinic acid or 3-CQA)
- Cryptochlorogenic acid (4-O-caffeoylquinic acid or 4-CGA)
- Neochlorogenic acid (5-O-caffeoylquinic acid or 5-CQA)
- Scopolin
