= C22H26O11 =

The molecular formula C_{22}H_{26}O_{11} (molar mass: 466.43 g/mol, exact mass: 466.147512 u) may refer to:

- Agnuside
- Curculigoside A
