= Triacetic acid lactone =

Chemical compound (4-hydroxy-6-methyl-2-pyrone)

Names
- Preferred IUPAC name 4-Hydroxy-6-methyl-2H-pyran-2-one
- Other names: Triacetate lactone; 3,5-Dihydroxysorbic acid δ-lactone; 4-Hydroxy-6-Methyl-2-Pyrone; 4-Hydroxy-6-Methyl-a-pyrone; 4-Hydroxy-6-Methylpyran-2-one; 6-Methyl-4-Hydroxy-2-Pyrone; 2H-Pyran-2-one; 4-Hydroxy-6-Methyl;

Identifiers
CAS Number	675-10-5
3D model (JSmol)	Interactive image
ChEBI	CHEBI:16458
ChemSpider	10229807
ECHA InfoCard	100.010.564
EC Number	211-619-2
PubChem CID	54675757
UNII	S1S883S4EE
CompTox Dashboard (EPA)	DTXSID1060974
- InChI: InChI=1S/C6H6O3/c1-4-2-5(7)3-6(8)9-4/h2-3,7H,1H3 Key: NSYSSMYQPLSPOD-UHFFFAOYSA-N; InChI=1/C6H6O3/c1-4-2-5(7)3-6(8)9-4/h2-3,7H,1H3 Key: NSYSSMYQPLSPOD-UHFFFAOYAI
- SMILES: C/C1=CC(\O)=C/C(=O)O1

Properties
Chemical formula	C_{6}H_{6}O_{3}
Molar mass	126.12 g mol^{−1}
Appearance	light yellow crystal powder
Density	1.348 g cm^{−3}
Melting point	188 to 190 °C (370 to 374 °F; 461 to 463 K)
Boiling point	285.9 °C (546.6 °F; 559.0 K)
Solubility in water	8.60 g L-1 at 20°C in H_{2}O

Hazards
- Occupational safety and health (OHS/OSH)
Main hazards	Moderately Toxic
- GHS labelling
Pictograms	(GHS07: Exclamation mark)
Signal word	Warning
Hazard statements	H315, H319, H335
Precautionary statements	P261, P264, P271, P280, P302+P352, P304+P340, P305+P351+P338, P312, P321, P332+P313, P337+P313, P362, P403+P233, P405, P501
Flash point	127.9 °C (262.2 °F; 401.0 K)
- Except where otherwise noted, data are given for materials in their standard state (at 25 °C [77 °F], 100 kPa). Infobox references

Triacetic acid lactone (TAL; 4-hydroxy-6-methyl-2-pyrone) is an organic compound derived enzymatically from glucose. It is a light yellow solid that is soluble in organic solvents.

== Structure ==
Triacetic acid lactone consists of two main tautomers.

Tautomerization of triacetic acid lactone

The tautomer on the left, featuring a 4-hydroxy group at the C4 carbon, is dominant. Triacetic acid lactone is classified as a 2-pyrone compound due to the ketone group on the C2 carbon in its dominant form.

== Synthesis ==
Triacetic acid lactone is synthesized either from dehydroacetic acid, another 2-pyrone derivative, or from glucose by enzymatic catalysis. In its original synthesis, triacetic acid lactone was obtained by treatment of dehydroacetic acid with sulfuric acid at 135 °C. Dehydroacetic acid undergoes ring-opening and hydration to form "tetracetic acid". Upon cooling, triacetic acid reverts to a lactone ring similar to the dehydroacetic acid structure, and the triacetic acid lactone is recovered by crystallization in cold water.

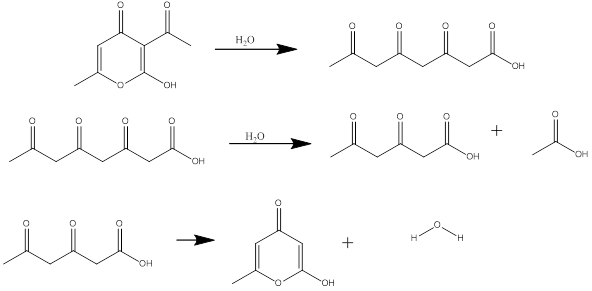
Synthesis of triacetic acid lactone completed by Collie

== Biosynthesis ==
The microbial synthesis of triacetic acid lactone requires the enzyme 2-pyrone synthase (2-PS). This enzyme has been examined in two hosts Escherichia coli and Saccharomyces cerevisiae. The Saccharomyces cerevisiae host being used during the synthesis produces a higher yield (70%) compared with the Escherichia coli host, which produces a yield of 40% of triacetic acid lactone. This enzyme catalyzes the synthesis of triacetic acid lactone from acetyl-CoA via two subsequent condensations with malonyl-CoA. This produces an intermediate of 3,5-diketohexanoate thioester, which undergoes ring closure to produce triacetic acid lactone.

== Reactivity ==
The lactone is a versatile intermediate in organic synthesis. Substantial negative charge accumulates on the C3 carbon, rendering it nucleophilic, but the C5 carbon is inert.

It has also been described as a platform chemical, meaning that it could be the precursor to other fine chemicals. The lactone undergoes decarboxylation to acetylacetone. It is also a precursor to sorbic acid, dienoic acid, and hexenoic acid. Dienoic acid is used to inhibit the growth of various molds and hexenoic acid is used as a flavoring agent. Acetylacetone is used for metal extraction and plating and as a food additive.

== See also ==
- 4-Hydroxycoumarin - bicyclic analogue
