= Acutifolin A =

Names
- IUPAC name (1S,5S,6S)-1-Hydroxy-6-(4-hydroxyphenyl)-5-(3-methylbut-2-enyl)bicyclo[3.3.1]non-2-ene-4,9-dione

Identifiers
CAS Number	350221-53-3
3D model (JSmol)	Interactive image
ChEBI	CHEBI:178217
ChemSpider	9242517
PubChem CID	11067365
UNII	723V8KX86A
CompTox Dashboard (EPA)	DTXSID001045613
- InChI: InChI=1S/C20H22O4/c1-13(2)7-12-20-16(14-3-5-15(21)6-4-14)8-10-19(24,18(20)23)11-9-17(20)22/h3-7,9,11,16,21,24H,8,10,12H2,1-2H3/t16-,19-,20-/m0/s1
- SMILES: CC(=CC[C@@]12[C@@H](CC[C@@](C1=O)(C=CC2=O)O)C3=CC=C(C=C3)O)C

Properties
Chemical formula	C_{20}H_{22}O_{4}
Molar mass	326.392 g·mol^{−1}
Solubility	Methanol
Chiral rotation ([α]_{D})	+94.7° (589.3 nm)
- Except where otherwise noted, data are given for materials in their standard state (at 25 °C [77 °F], 100 kPa). Infobox references

Acutifolin A is bio-active isolate of the bark of Brosimum acutifolium, a Brazilian folk medicine ("Mururé").
