= C18H16O6 =

The molecular formula C_{18}H_{16}O_{6} (molar mass: 328.32 g/mol, exact mass: 328.094688 u) may refer to:

- Alnetin, a flavone
- Biliatresone
- Salvigenin, a flavone
- Vermistatin
