= Pectolinarigenin =

Names
- IUPAC name 5,7-Dihydroxy-4′,6-dimethoxyflavone
- Systematic IUPAC name 5,7-Dihydroxy-6-methoxy-2-(4-methoxyphenyl)-4H-1-benzopyran-4-one

Identifiers
CAS Number	520-12-7
3D model (JSmol)	Interactive image
ChemSpider	4478521
ECHA InfoCard	100.007.534
PubChem CID	5320438
UNII	4U3UZ1K35N
CompTox Dashboard (EPA)	DTXSID20199960
- InChI: InChI=1S/C17H14O6/c1-21-10-5-3-9(4-6-10)13-7-11(18)15-14(23-13)8-12(19)17(22-2)16(15)20/h3-8,19-20H,1-2H3 Key: GPQLHGCIAUEJQK-UHFFFAOYSA-N; InChI=1/C17H14O6/c1-21-10-5-3-9(4-6-10)13-7-11(18)15-14(23-13)8-12(19)17(22-2)16(15)20/h3-8,19-20H,1-2H3 Key: GPQLHGCIAUEJQK-UHFFFAOYAB
- SMILES: COC1=CC=C(C=C1)C2=CC(=O)C3=C(C(=C(C=C3O2)O)OC)O

Properties
Chemical formula	C_{17}H_{14}O_{6}
Molar mass	314.293 g·mol^{−1}

Related compounds
Related compounds	Pectolinarin
- Except where otherwise noted, data are given for materials in their standard state (at 25 °C [77 °F], 100 kPa). Infobox references

Pectolinarigenin is a Cirsium isolate with anti-inflammatory activity and belongs to the flavones.
