= C13H18O7 =

The molecular formula C_{13}H_{18}O_{7} (molar mass : 286.28 g/mol, react mass : 286.105253 u) may refer to:

- Gastrodin, a natural polyphenol found in the orchid Gastrodia elata
- Salicin, a natural polyphenol found in willow
