= C15H14O7 =

The molecular formula C_{15}H_{14}O_{7} may refer to:

- Epigallocatechin
- Fusarubin, a naphthoquinone antibiotic
- Gallocatechol
- Leucocyanidin, a leucoanthocyanidin
- Melacacidin, a leucoanthocyanidin
