= Liriodendrin =

Names
- IUPAC name (2S,3R,4S,5S,6R)-2-[4-[6-[3,5-Dimethoxy-4-[(2S,3R,4S,5S,6R)-3,4,5-trihydroxy-6-(hydroxymethyl)oxan-2-yl]oxyphenyl]-1,3,3a,4,6,6a-hexahydrofuro[3,4-c]furan-3-yl]-2,6-dimethoxyphenoxy]-6-(hydroxymethyl)oxane-3,4,5-triol

Identifiers
CAS Number	573-44-4
3D model (JSmol)	Interactive image
ChemSpider	10235043
PubChem CID	73636
UNII	J2SJ3W6H9R
- InChI: InChI=1S/C34H46O18/c1-43-17-5-13(6-18(44-2)31(17)51-33-27(41)25(39)23(37)21(9-35)49-33)29-15-11-48-30(16(15)12-47-29)14-7-19(45-3)32(20(8-14)46-4)52-34-28(42)26(40)24(38)22(10-36)50-34/h5-8,15-16,21-30,33-42H,9-12H2,1-4H3/t15-,16-,21+,22+,23+,24+,25-,26-,27+,28+,29+,30+,33-,34-/m0/s1 Key: FFDULTAFAQRACT-XKBSQSBASA-N; InChI=1/C34H46O18/c1-43-17-5-13(6-18(44-2)31(17)51-33-27(41)25(39)23(37)21(9-35)49-33)29-15-11-48-30(16(15)12-47-29)14-7-19(45-3)32(20(8-14)46-4)52-34-28(42)26(40)24(38)22(10-36)50-34/h5-8,15-16,21-30,33-42H,9-12H2,1-4H3/t15-,16-,21+,22+,23+,24+,25-,26-,27+,28+,29+,30+,33-,34-/m0/s1 Key: FFDULTAFAQRACT-XKBSQSBABH
- SMILES: COC1=CC(=CC(=C1O[C@H]2[C@@H]([C@H]([C@@H]([C@H](O2)CO)O)O)O)OC)C3C4COC(C4CO3)C5=CC(=C(C(=C5)OC)O[C@H]6[C@@H]([C@H]([C@@H]([C@H](O6)CO)O)O)O)OC

Properties
Chemical formula	C_{34}H_{46}O_{18}
Molar mass	742.724 g·mol^{−1}
- Except where otherwise noted, data are given for materials in their standard state (at 25 °C [77 °F], 100 kPa). Infobox references

Liriodendrin is an antiarrhythmic lignan isolated from Pittosporum.
