= C20H24O4 =

The molecular formula C_{20}H_{24}O_{4} may refer to:

- Bipinnatin_J
- Crocetin, a natural carotenoid dicarboxylic acid found in the crocus flower
- Dithymoquinone
- 5-Geranyloxy-7-methoxycoumarin
- 16α-LE2
- Macelignan, a lignan found in the nutmeg
- Sobetirome
