= C21H24O9 =

The molecular formula C_{21}H_{24}O_{9} (molar mass: 420.41 g/mol, exact mass: 420.1420 u) may refer to:

- Isorhapontin, a stilbenoid glucoside
- Rhaponticin, a stilbenoid glucoside
