= C30H24O12 =

The molecular formula C_{30}H_{24}O_{12} (molar mass : 576.5 g/mol, exact mass : 576.126776 u) may refer to:

- Proanthocyanidin A1, an A type proanthocyanidin
- Proanthocyanidin A2, an A type proanthocyanidin
