= C15H24O2 =

The molecular formula C_{15}H_{24}O_{2} (molar mass: 236.35 g/mol, exact mass: 236.17763 u) may refer to:

- Curdione
- Capsidiol
- DB-2073, an alkylresorcinol antibiotic
- Hernandulcin
