= C7H6O5 =

The molecular formula C_{7}H_{6}O_{5} (molar mass: 170.12 g/mol, exact mass: 170.021523 u) may refer to:

- Gallic acid, a phenolic compound
- Phloroglucinol carboxylic acid, a phenolic compound
