= C14H8O5 =

The molecular formula C_{14}H_{8}O_{5} (molar mass: 256.21 g/mol, exact mass: 256.037173) may refer to:

- Anthrapurpurin, a purple dye used in histology
- 1,2,4-Trihydroxyanthraquinone, aka Purpurin, an anthraquinone dye
- 1,3,8-Trihydroxyanthraquinone
