= C11H12O5 =

The molecular formula C_{11}H_{12}O_{5} (molar mass: 224.21 g/mol, exact mass: 224.0685 u) may refer to:

- Sepedonin, a chemical compound with a tropolone moiety
- Sinapinic acid, a naturally occurring hydroxycinnamic acid
- 2-Hydroxyethyl methyl terephthalate
