= Viniferal =

- Chemical structure of viniferal

Names
- Preferred IUPAC name (2R,2′S,3R,3′S)-3′-(3,5-Dihydroxyphenyl)-6′-hydroxy-2,2′-bis(4-hydroxyphenyl)[3,4′-bi-1-benzofuran]-5-carbaldehyde
- Other names (−)-Viniferal

Identifiers
CAS Number	180413-42-7
3D model (JSmol)	Interactive image
ChEBI	CHEBI:169301
ChEMBL	ChEMBL469541 (underspecified stereo)
ChemSpider	26233612
PubChem CID	57518718
CompTox Dashboard (EPA)	DTXSID80727006
- InChI: InChI=1S/C35H26O8/c36-17-18-1-10-29-27(11-18)32(35(42-29)20-4-8-23(38)9-5-20)28-15-26(41)16-30-33(28)31(21-12-24(39)14-25(40)13-21)34(43-30)19-2-6-22(37)7-3-19/h1-17,31-32,34-35,37-41H/t31-,32-,34+,35-/m0/s1 Key: DHTHKPNODOWMKF-VPIGGYNKSA-N; InChI=1/C35H26O8/c36-17-18-1-10-29-27(11-18)32(35(42-29)20-4-8-23(38)9-5-20)28-15-26(41)16-30-33(28)31(21-12-24(39)14-25(40)13-21)34(43-30)19-2-6-22(37)7-3-19/h1-17,31-32,34-35,37-41H/t31-,32-,34+,35-/m0/s1 Key: DHTHKPNODOWMKF-VPIGGYNKBX
- SMILES: O=CC1=CC=C(O[C@@H](C2=CC=C(O)C=C2)[C@@H]3C4=CC(O)=CC5=C4[C@H](C6=CC(O)=CC(O)=C6)[C@@H](C7=CC=C(O)C=C7)O5)C3=C1

Properties
Chemical formula	C_{35}H_{26}O_{8}
Molar mass	574.585 g·mol^{−1}
- Except where otherwise noted, data are given for materials in their standard state (at 25 °C [77 °F], 100 kPa). verify (what is ?) Infobox references

Viniferal is a hydroxystilbenoid with an aldehyde group found in Vitis vinifera (grapevine).
