= C27H30O15 =

The molecular formula C_{27}H_{30}O_{15}, molar mass: 594.52 g/mol, exact mass: 594.15847 u, may refer to:

- Kaempferol 3-O-rutinoside, a bitter-tasting flavonol glycoside
- Saponarin, a flavone glycoside
- Veronicastroside, a flavone glycoside
