= C18H12O4 =

The molecular formula C_{18}H_{12}O_{4} (molar mass: 292.28 g/mol, exact mass: 292.0736 u) may refer to:

- Karanjin
- Polyporic acid
