= C18H14O9 =

The molecular formula C_{18}H_{14}O_{9} (molar mass: 374.29 g/mol, exact mass: 374.063782 u) may refer to:

- Connorstictic acid, a depsidone
- Fucophlorethol A, a phlorotannin
- Protocetraric acid, a depsidone
- Trifucol, a phlorotannin
