= C18H22O6 =

The molecular formula C_{18}H_{22}O_{6} (molar mass: 334.36 g/mol, exact mass: 334.1416 u) may refer to:

- Combretastatin
- Combretastatin B-1
