= C25H25O12 =

The molecular formula C_{25}H_{25}O_{12} (molar mass: 517.45 g/mol, exact mass: 517.1341 u) may refer to:

- Vitisin B (pyranoanthocyanin)
