= C15H18O4 =

The molecular formula C_{15}H_{18}O_{4} may refer to:

- Artemisin, a sesquiterpene lactone
- Helenalin, a sesquiterpene lactone
- Parthenin, a sesquiterpene lactone
- Plicatin A, a hydroxycinnamic acid
- Psilostachyin B
