= C56H44O13 =

The molecular formula C_{56}H_{44}O_{13} (molar mass: 924.94 g/mol, exact mass: 924.278191 u) may refer to:

- Carasinol B, a stilbenoid
- Kobophenol A, a stilbenoid
