= C14H14O3 =

The molecular formula C_{14}H_{14}O_{3} (molar mass: 230.25 g/mol, exact mass: 230.094294 u) may refer to:

- Dihydro-resveratrol, a natural phenol found in wine
- Kavain
- Naproxen
- Pindone
