= Koaburaside =

Names
- IUPAC name 4-Hydroxy-3,5-dimethoxyphenyl β-D-glucopyranoside
- Systematic IUPAC name (2S,3R,4S,5S,6R)-2-(4-Hydroxy-3,5-dimethoxyphenoxy)-6-(hydroxymethyl)oxane-3,4,5-triol

Identifiers
| CAS Number | 41653-73-0 |
| 3D model (JSmol) | Interactive image |
| ChemSpider | 23326619 |
| PubChem CID | 5318820 |
| UNII | J8R952KQV3 |
| CompTox Dashboard (EPA) | DTXSID301045650 |
- InChI: InChI=1S/C14H20O9/c1-20-7-3-6(4-8(21-2)10(7)16)22-14-13(19)12(18)11(17)9(5-15)23-14/h3-4,9,11-19H,5H2,1-2H3/t9-,11-,12+,13-,14-/m1/s1 Key: SWHCKWOYUSDWOF-RGCYKPLRSA-N; InChI=1/C14H20O9/c1-20-7-3-6(4-8(21-2)10(7)16)22-14-13(19)12(18)11(17)9(5-15)23-14/h3-4,9,11-19H,5H2,1-2H3/t9-,11-,12+,13-,14-/m1/s1 Key: SWHCKWOYUSDWOF-RGCYKPLRBF
- SMILES: COC1=CC(=CC(=C1O)OC)O[C@H]2[C@@H]([C@H]([C@@H]([C@H](O2)CO)O)O)O

Properties
| Chemical formula | C_{14}H_{20}O_{9} |
| Molar mass | 332.305 g·mol^{−1} |
- Except where otherwise noted, data are given for materials in their standard state (at 25 °C [77 °F], 100 kPa). Infobox references

Koaburaside is an antihistamine compound isolated from Lindera obtusiloba.
