= C12H12O4 =

The molecular formula C_{12}H_{12}O_{4} (molar mass: 220.22 g/mol, exact mass: 220.0736 u) may refer to:

- Eugenitin
- Hispolon
- Siderin
