= C24H18O12 =

The molecular formula C_{24}H_{18}O_{12} (molar mass: 498.39 g/mol, exact mass: 498.07982598 u) may refer to:

- Tetrafucol A, a fucol-type phlorotannin
- Tetraphlorethol C, a phlorethol-type phlorotannin
