= C19H18O6 =

The molecular formula C_{19}H_{18}O_{6} (molar mass: 342.34 g/mol, exact mass: 342.1103 u) may refer to:

- Zapotin, a flavone
- Decarboxylated 8,5'-diferulic acid, a diferulic acid
