= C9H10O5 =

The molecular formula C_{9}H_{10}O_{5} (molar mass: 198.17 g/mol, exact mass 198.052823) may refer to:

- Danshensu
- Ethyl gallate, an antioxidant food additive
- Syringic acid, a polyphenol
- Vanillylmandelic acid, a catecholamine
