= C20H18O11 =

The molecular formula C_{20}H_{18}O_{11} (molar mass: 434.35 g/mol, exact mass: 434.084911 u) may refer to:

- Avicularin, a flavonol
- Guaijaverin, a flavonol
