= C9H6O3 =

The molecular formula C_{9}H_{6}O_{3} (molar mass: 162.14 g/mol, exact mass: 162.031694 u) may refer to:

- Umbelliferone, also known as 7-hydroxycoumarin or hydrangine
- 4-Hydroxycoumarin
