= C16H14O4 =

The molecular formula C_{16}H_{14}O_{4} (molar mss : 270.28 g/mol, exact mass : 270.089209 u) may refer to:

- Alpinetin, a flavanone
- Cardamomin, a chalcone
- Imperatorin, a coumarin
- Medicarpin, a flavonoid
- Nudol, a phenanthrenoid
