= C13H8O4 =

The molecular formula C_{13}H_{8}O_{4} (molar mass: 228.20 g/mol, exact mass: 228.0423 u) may refer to:

- Euxanthone, a naturally occurring xanthonoid
- Urolithin A, a metabolite compound
