= C20H20O9 =

The molecular formula C_{20}H_{20}O_{9} (molar mass: 404.36 g/mol, exact mass: 404.110732 u) may refer to:

- Brickellin, an O-methylated flavonol
- Trans-resveratrol-3-O-glucuronide, a stilbenoid
