= C10H12O5 =

The molecular formula C_{10}H_{12}O_{5} (molar mass : 212.19 g/mol, exact mass : 212.068473) may refer to:

- Danielone (CAS number : 90426-22-5)
- Homosyringic acid (CAS number : 4385-56-2)
- Propyl gallate
- 2,3,4-Trimethoxybenzoic acid (CAS number : 573-11-5)
- 2,4,5-Trimethoxybenzoic acid or Asaronic acid (CAS number : 490-64-2)
- 3,4,5-Trimethoxybenzoic acid or Eudesmic acid (CAS number : 118-41-2)
