= C28H22O6 =

The molecular formula C_{28}H_{22}O_{6} (molar mass: 454.47 g/mol, exact mass: 454.141638 u) may refer to:

- Ampelopsin B, a resveratrol oligomer
- Cyphostemmin A, a resveratrol dimer
- Cyphostemmin B, a resveratrol dimer
- Delta-viniferin, a resveratrol dimer
- Epsilon-viniferin, a resveratrol dimer
- Pallidol, a resveratrol dimer
- Quadrangularin A, a resveratrol dimer
