= Amurensin =

Amurensin may refer to:

- Amurensin (flavonol), a flavonol found in Phellodendron amurense
- Amurensin A, a resveratrol dimer found in Vitis amurensis
- Amurensin B, a stilbenoid trimer found in Vitis amurensis
- Amurensin C, a resveratrol trimer found in Vitis amurensis
- Amurensin D, a resveratrol trimer found in Vitis amurensis
- Amurensin E, a resveratrol pentamer found in Vitis amurensis
- Amurensin F, a resveratrol pentamer found in Vitis amurensis
- Amurensin G, a resveratrol trimer found in Vitis amurensis
- Amurensin H, a resveratrol dimer found in Vitis amurensis
- Amurensin I, a resveratrol tetramer found in Vitis amurensis
- Amurensin J, a resveratrol tetramer found in Vitis amurensis
- Amurensin K, a resveratrol tetramer found in Vitis amurensis
- Amurensin L, a resveratrol tetramer found in Vitis amurensis
- Amurensin M, a resveratrol tetramer found in Vitis amurensis

== See also ==
- Amurensine, an alkaloid found in some Papaver species
