= Cyphostemmin =

Cyphostemmin may refer to:

- Cyphostemmin A
- Cyphostemmin B
- Cyphostemmin C
