= Ampelopsin (compound) =

Ampelopsin may refer to:

- Ampelopsin, a flavanonol
- Ampelopsin A, a stilbene oligomer
- Ampelopsin B, a stilbene oligomer
- Ampelopsin C, a stilbene oligomer
- Ampelopsin D, a stilbene oligomer
- Ampelopsin E, a stilbene oligomer
- Ampelopsin F, a stilbene oligomer
