= Amurensin K =

Chemical compound

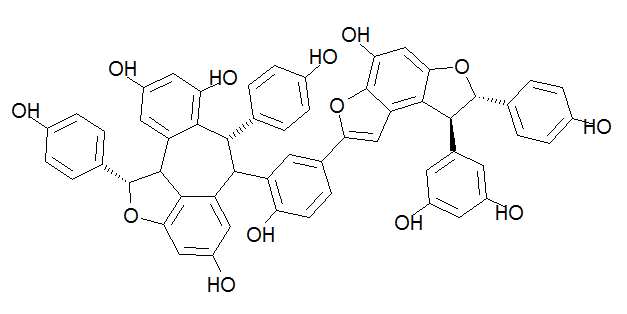

Names
- Preferred IUPAC name (1S,6R,7S,11bS)-6-{5-[(7S,8S)-8-(3,5-Dihydroxyphenyl)-4-hydroxy-7-(4-hydroxyphenyl)-7,8-dihydrobenzo[1,2-b:4,3-b′]difuran-2-yl]-2-hydroxyphenyl}-1,7-bis(4-hydroxyphenyl)-1,6,7,11b-tetrahydrobenzo[6,7]cyclohepta[1,2,3-cd][1]benzofuran-4,8,10-triol

Identifiers
CAS Number	388121-56-0
3D model (JSmol)	Interactive image
ChemSpider	17288573
PubChem CID	16131909
UNII	37E366SR4Q
CompTox Dashboard (EPA)	DTXSID801045300
- InChI: InChI=1S/C56H40O13/c57-30-8-1-25(2-9-30)47-49(38-20-36(63)22-45-51(38)53(39-19-35(62)21-42(65)50(39)47)55(68-45)27-5-12-32(59)13-6-27)37-17-28(7-14-41(37)64)44-23-40-52-46(24-43(66)56(40)67-44)69-54(26-3-10-31(58)11-4-26)48(52)29-15-33(60)18-34(61)16-29/h1-24,47-49,53-55,57-66H/t47-,48+,49+,53+,54-,55-/m1/s1 Key: KYCWATKXJOSHQR-KPXHRNBCSA-N
- SMILES: C1=CC(=CC=C1[C@@H]2[C@H](C3=CC(=CC4=C3[C@@H]([C@H](O4)C5=CC=C(C=C5)O)C6=CC(=CC(=C26)O)O)O)C7=C(C=CC(=C7)C8=CC9=C1[C@@H]([C@H](OC1=CC(=C9O8)O)C1=CC=C(C=C1)O)C1=CC(=CC(=C1)O)O)O)O

Properties
Chemical formula	C_{56}H_{40}O_{13}
Molar mass	920.91 g/mol
- Except where otherwise noted, data are given for materials in their standard state (at 25 °C [77 °F], 100 kPa). Infobox references

Amurensin K is an oligostilbene. It is a resveratrol tetramer found in Vitis amurensis. Preliminary tests have shown it to be an effective neuraminidase inhibitor against the influenza A virus subtype H1N1.
