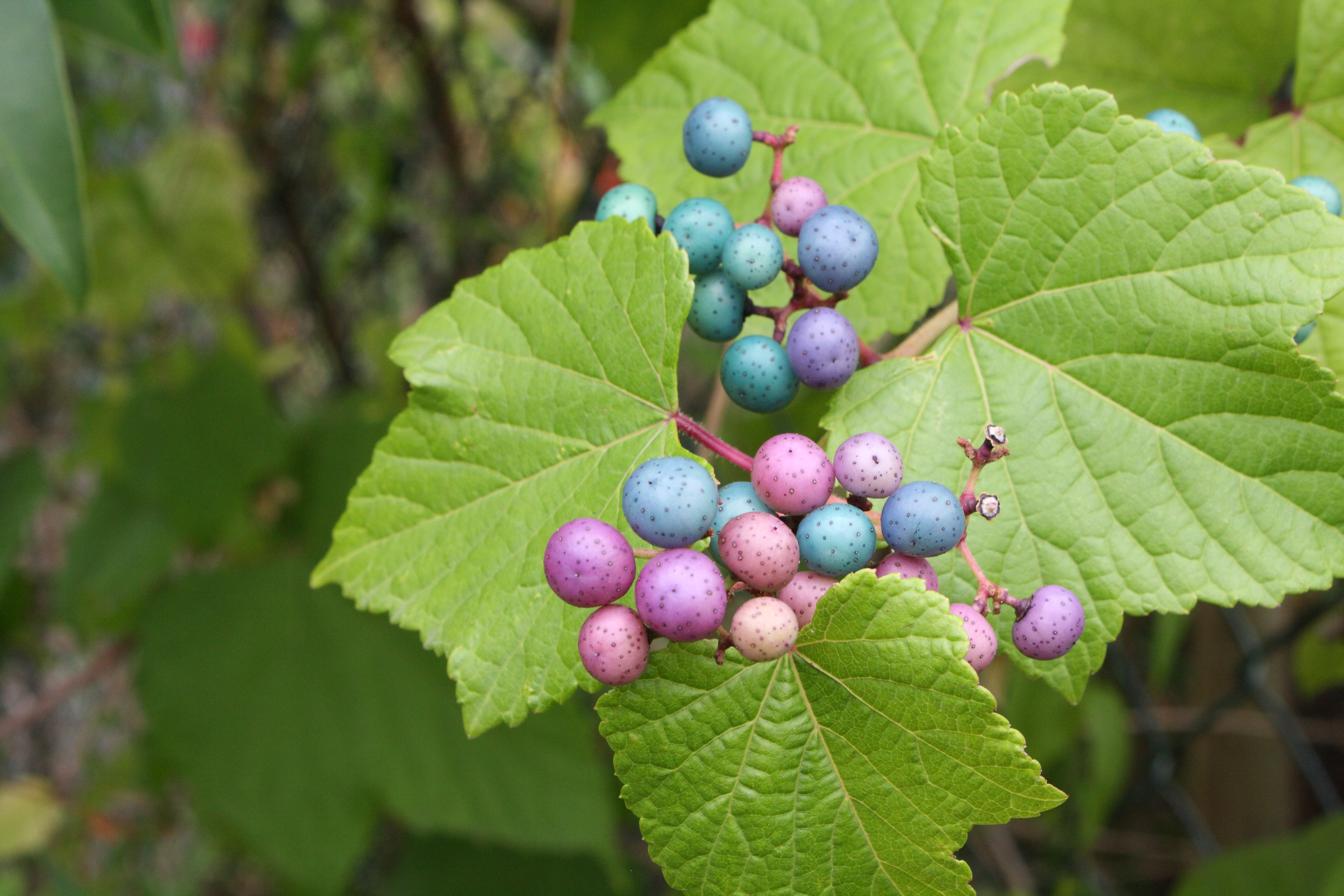

Conservation status
- Secure (NatureServe)

Scientific classification
- Kingdom: Plantae
- Clade: Tracheophytes
- Clade: Angiosperms
- Clade: Eudicots
- Clade: Rosids
- Order: Vitales
- Family: Vitaceae
- Genus: Ampelopsis
- Species: A. glandulosa

Binomial name
- Ampelopsis glandulosa (Wall.) Momiy.

Synonyms
- Ampelopsis brevipedunculata (Maxim.) Trautv.; Ampelopsis citrulloides Dippel nom. illeg.; Ampelopsis citrulloides Lebas; Ampelopsis heterophylla (Thunb.) Siebold & Zucc. nom. illeg.; Ampelopsis regeliana Carrière; Ampelopsis regeliana Dippel; Ampelopsis sinica (Miq.) W.T.Wang; Cissus brevipedunculata Maxim.; Vitis brevipedunculata (Maxim.) Dippel; Vitis elegans Kurz; Vitis glandulosa Wall.; Vitis heterophylla Thunb.; Vitis sinica Miq.

= Ampelopsis glandulosa =

Species of vine

Ampelopsis glandulosa, with common names creeper, porcelain berry, Amur peppervine, and wild grape, is a plant in the Vitaceae (grape) family, native to temperate areas of Asia, including China, Japan, India, Nepal, Myanmar, Vietnam, and the Philippines. It is commonly used as an ornamental plant, but is considered invasive outside its native range. Ampelopsis glandulosa is generally similar to, and potentially confused with, grape species (genus Vitis) and other Ampelopsis species.

== Varieties ==
Several varieties are distinguished:

- var. hancei
- var. kulingensis
- var. glandulosa
- var. heterophylla
- var. brevipedunculata

== Description ==
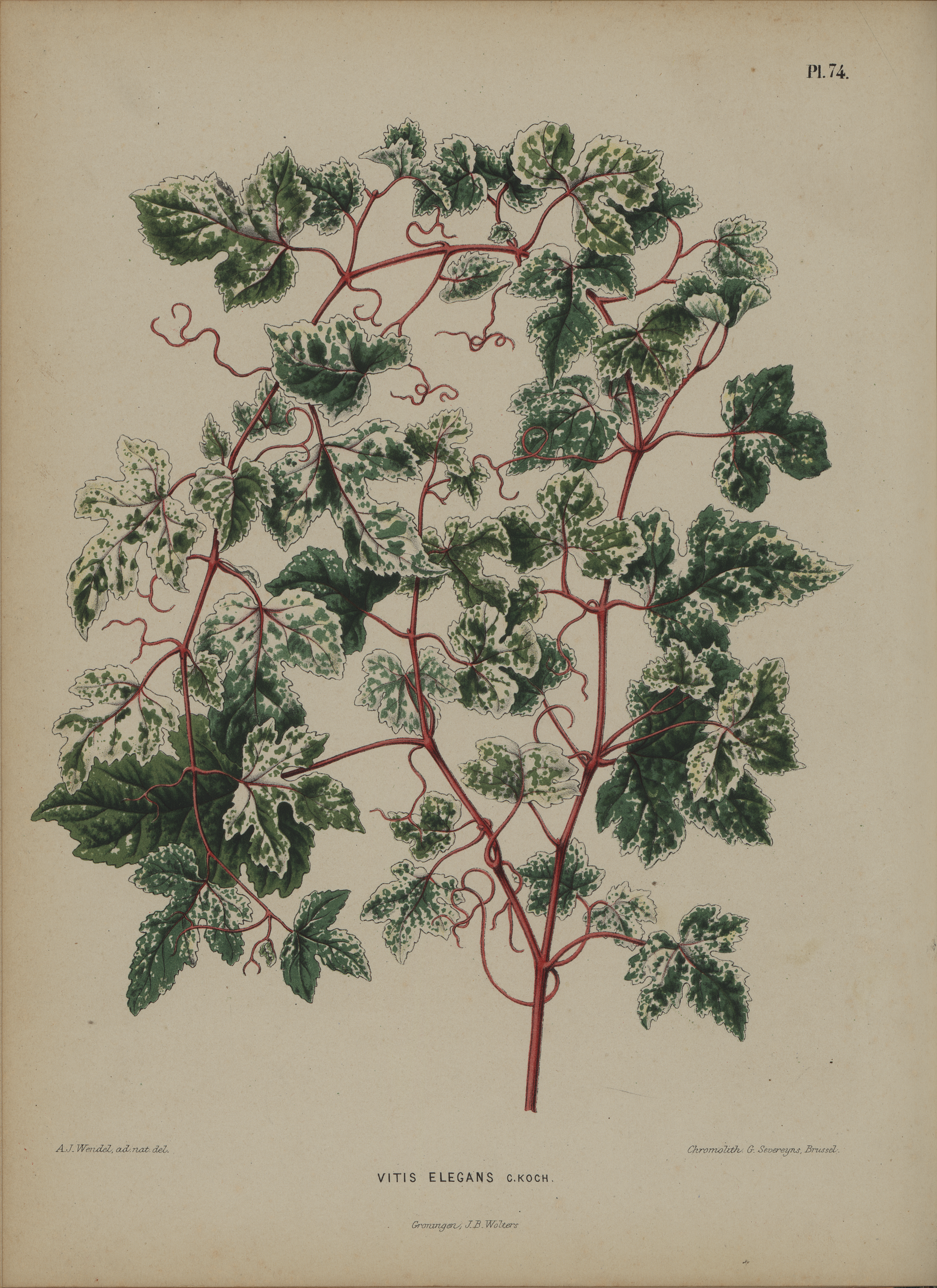
Ampelopsis glandulosa by Abraham Jacobus Wendel, 1868

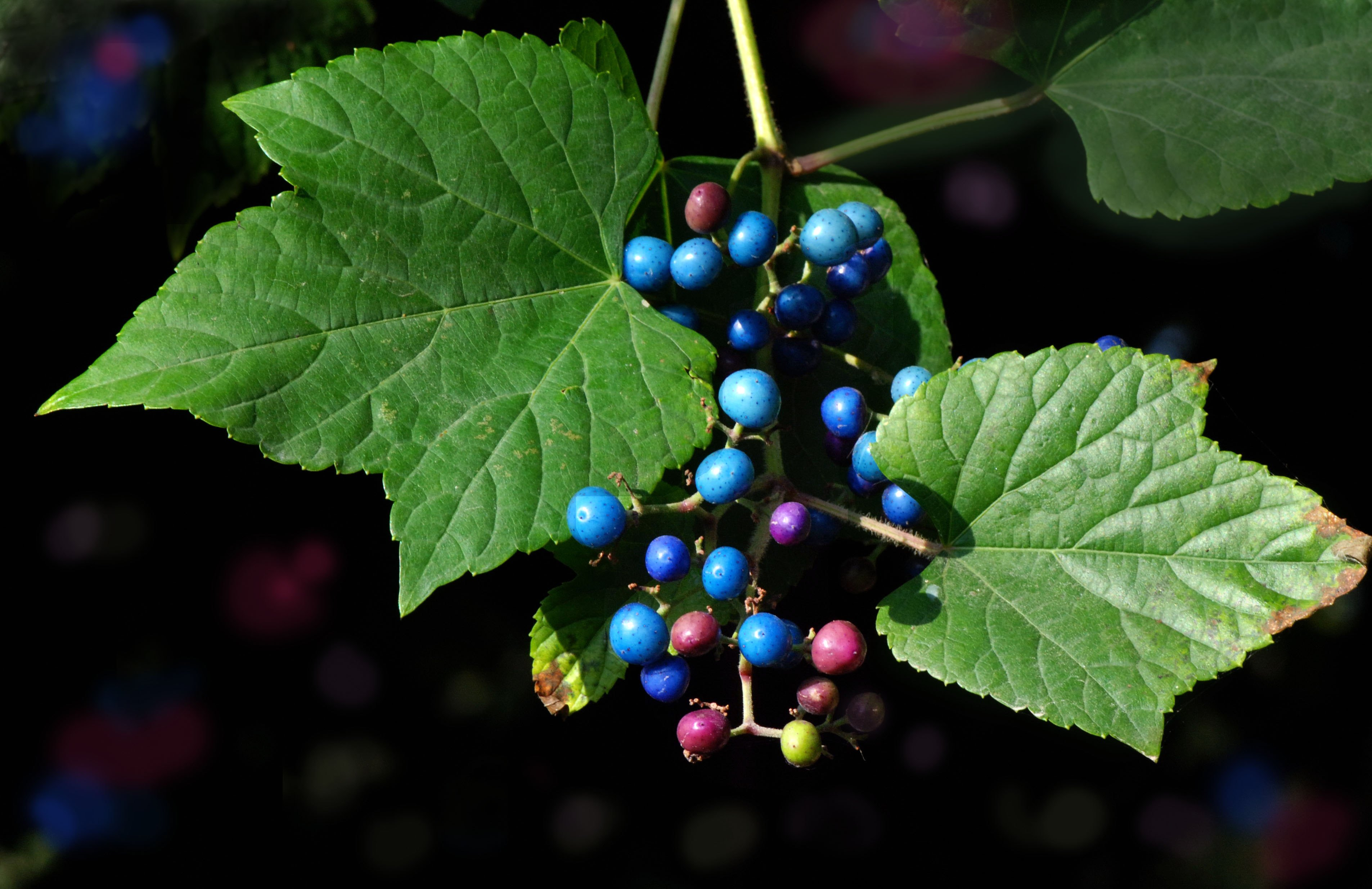
Fruit and leaves

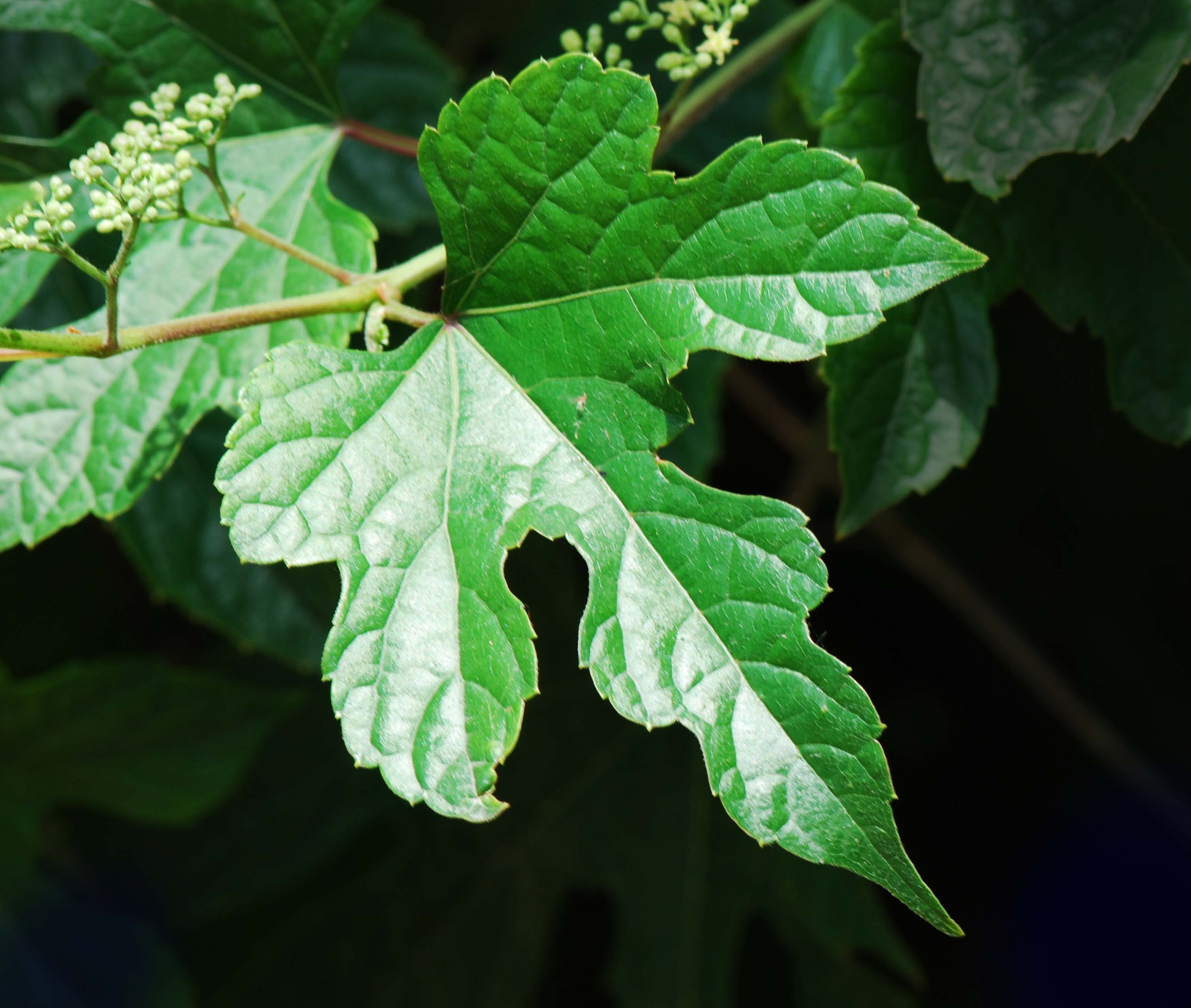
Inflorescence

Ampelopsis glandulosa is a deciduous, woody, perennial climbing vine with flowers and tendrils opposite the palmately lobed leaves, which have three to five more or less deep lobes and coarsely toothed margins (with a small apicle). Porcelain berry climbs via tendrils to a height of 4 to 6 metres (13 to 20 ft). The tendrils cling to the supports by non-adhesive tendrils similar to those of Vitis vines. The tendrils are opposite the leaves and have two or three branches.

The inflorescence is a corymbiform cyme, attached opposite a leaf. Flowers are small, green-white, born in umbels opposite the leaves, and appear in June through August. Fruits are 4 to 8 millimetres (0.16 to 0.31 in) in diameter, circular, containing two to four seeds, and may be many colors including green, blue, purple, pink or yellow with black or brown speckles; many different colors are present on the same plant. The berries are produced in late summer and fall. The seeds are dispersed by birds.

Porcelain berry can be confused with native grapes based on their similar leaf shape but can be differentiated by cutting the stem and observing the pith. Grapes have brown or tan pith but porcelain berry has white pith. Unlike grape bark, porcelainberry bark is covered in lenticels and does not peel.

== Distribution and habitat ==
Porcelainberry grows primarily in marginal habitats such as forest edges, pond margins, stream banks, thickets, and other areas of full sunlight to partial shade. It does not grow in permanently wet soils or heavily shaded areas, and is not typically found in the interiors of mature forests.

Porcelain berry is found natively in China, Korea, Japan and the Russian Far East. It was introduced in 1870s to the United States as a landscape plant. Its invasive range extends from Wisconsin and Iowa at its westernmost extent to the Atlantic coastline at the east, where it is found from New Hampshire to Georgia.

== Cultivation ==
Ampelopsis glandulosa var. brevipedunculata has distinctive medium blue fruit, and is an ornamental plant used in gardens to garnish the walls and arbours. Porcelain berry is still widely cultivated despite knowledge of its invasiveness. If not properly managed it will become dominant on, and kill smaller trees. It will climb larger trees to the top.

The variety A. brevipedunculata "Elegans" is less vigorous than the type species. It has smaller leaves, mottled in white and pink, and it is more sensitive to frost. Porcelain berry often co-exists with Virginia creeper, poison ivy and sassafras.

Ampelopsis glandulosa are not commonly cultivated for culinary purposes, as its taste is unlikable, being described as slimy and bland.

Ampelopsis glandulosa is sometimes cultivated for medical purposes, such as in China where it used to treat clots, boils, abscesses, ulcers, traumatic bruises, and aches.

Ampelopsis glandulosa was banned in Delaware as of July 1, 2022.

== Invasiveness ==
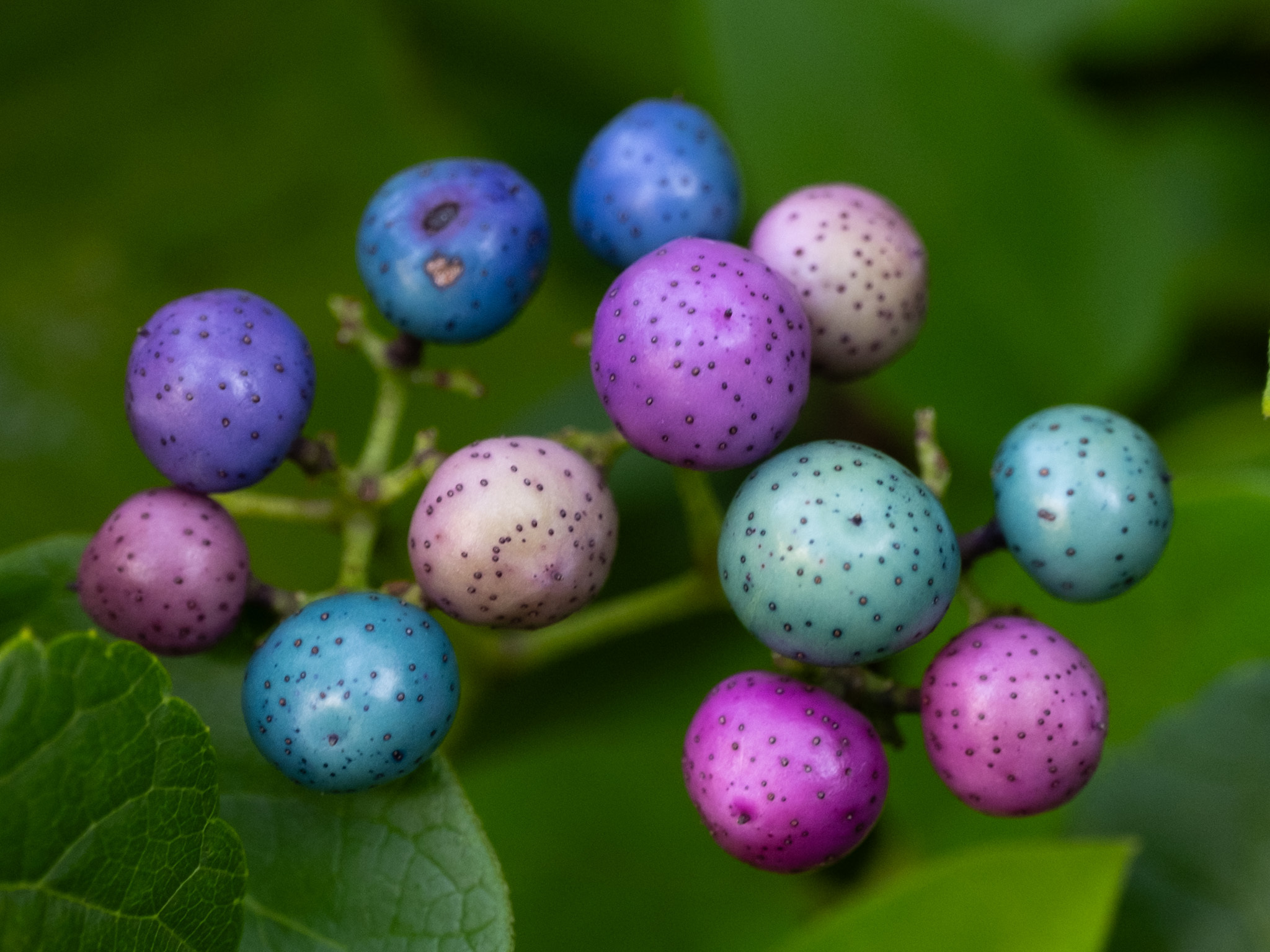
Fruits from an established population in Virginia, USA in 2026.

It is a major invasive plant species in parts of the Eastern United States. It is invasive in urban settings as well as in more pastoral settings. Porcelain berry is often found in disturbed areas such as roadsides, old fields, and floodplains where sunlight is abundant. The traits that make it a popular garden plant, such as its ground coverage, climbing habit, pest resistance, and tolerance of adverse conditions, also make it a robust invasive species. Invasive porcelain berry tends to shade out and kill shrubs and younger trees, and larger growths will climb over larger plants, cover them, and potentially kill by blocking sunlight. Birds consume the seeds of porcelain berry and act as a vector to transport it.

== Chemistry ==
The unusual blue color of the berries is due to an anthocyanidins-flavonols copigmentation phenomenon.

Ampelopsin A, B and C are stilbene oligomers found in A. glandulosa var hancei (formerly A. brevipedunculata var. hancei).
