= Malonyl-CoA:4-coumaroyl-CoA malonyltransferase (cyclizing) =

Malonyl-CoA:4-coumaroyl-CoA malonyltransferase (cyclizing) may refer to:

- Trihydroxystilbene synthase
- Naringenin-chalcone synthase
