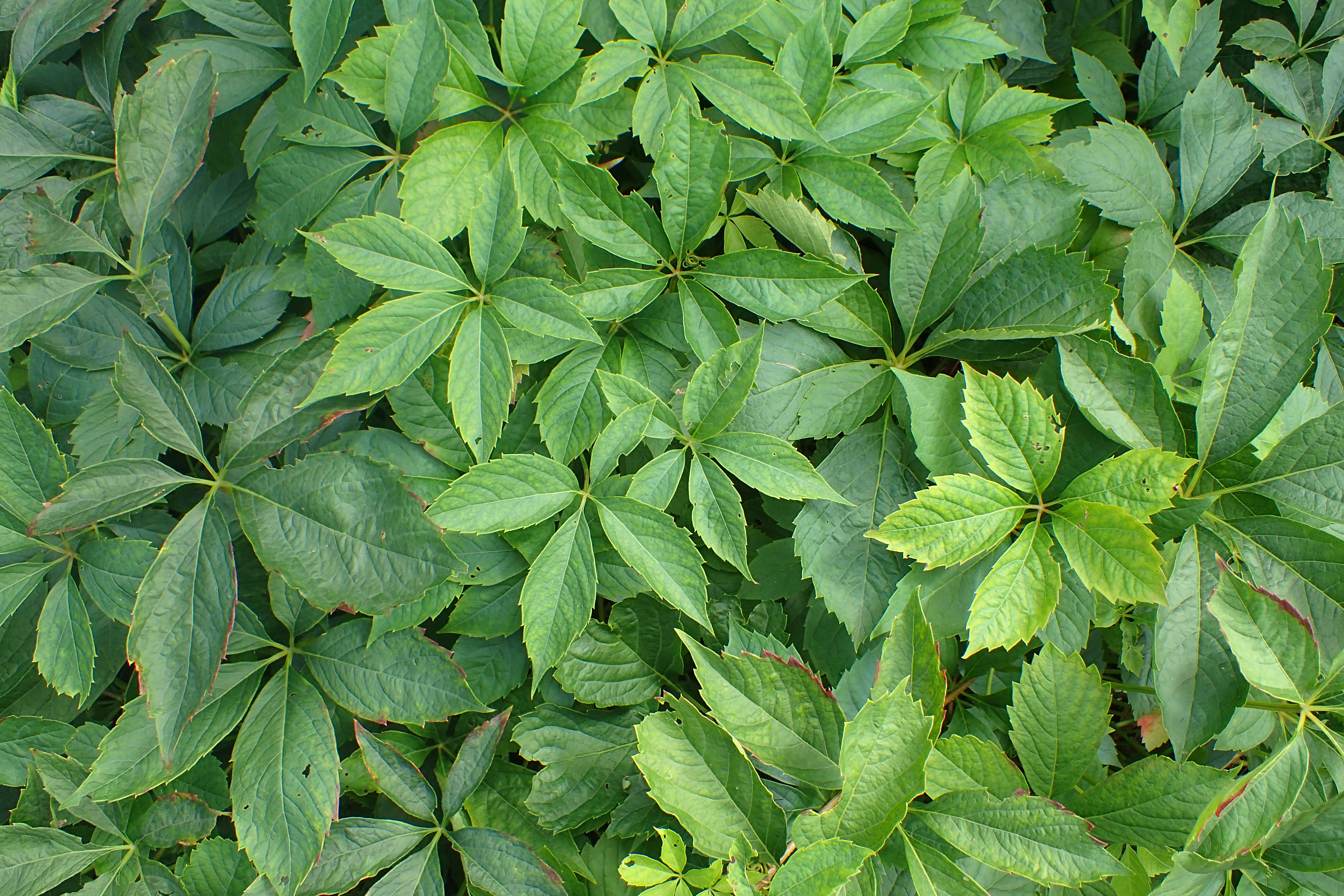

Scientific classification
- Kingdom: Plantae
- Clade: Tracheophytes
- Clade: Angiosperms
- Clade: Eudicots
- Clade: Rosids
- Order: Vitales
- Family: Vitaceae
- Genus: Parthenocissus
- Species: P. laetevirens

Binomial name
- Parthenocissus laetevirens Rehder, 1912

= Parthenocissus laetevirens =

Species of vine

Parthenocissus laetevirens is a climbing plant species in the genus Parthenocissus found in China.

Parthenocissus laetevirens contains the stilbene oligomers laetevirenol A, B, C, D and E, the stilbene tetramers laetevirenol F and G as well as the dimers of resveratrol parthenocissin A, quadrangularin A, pallidol and amurensin A.
