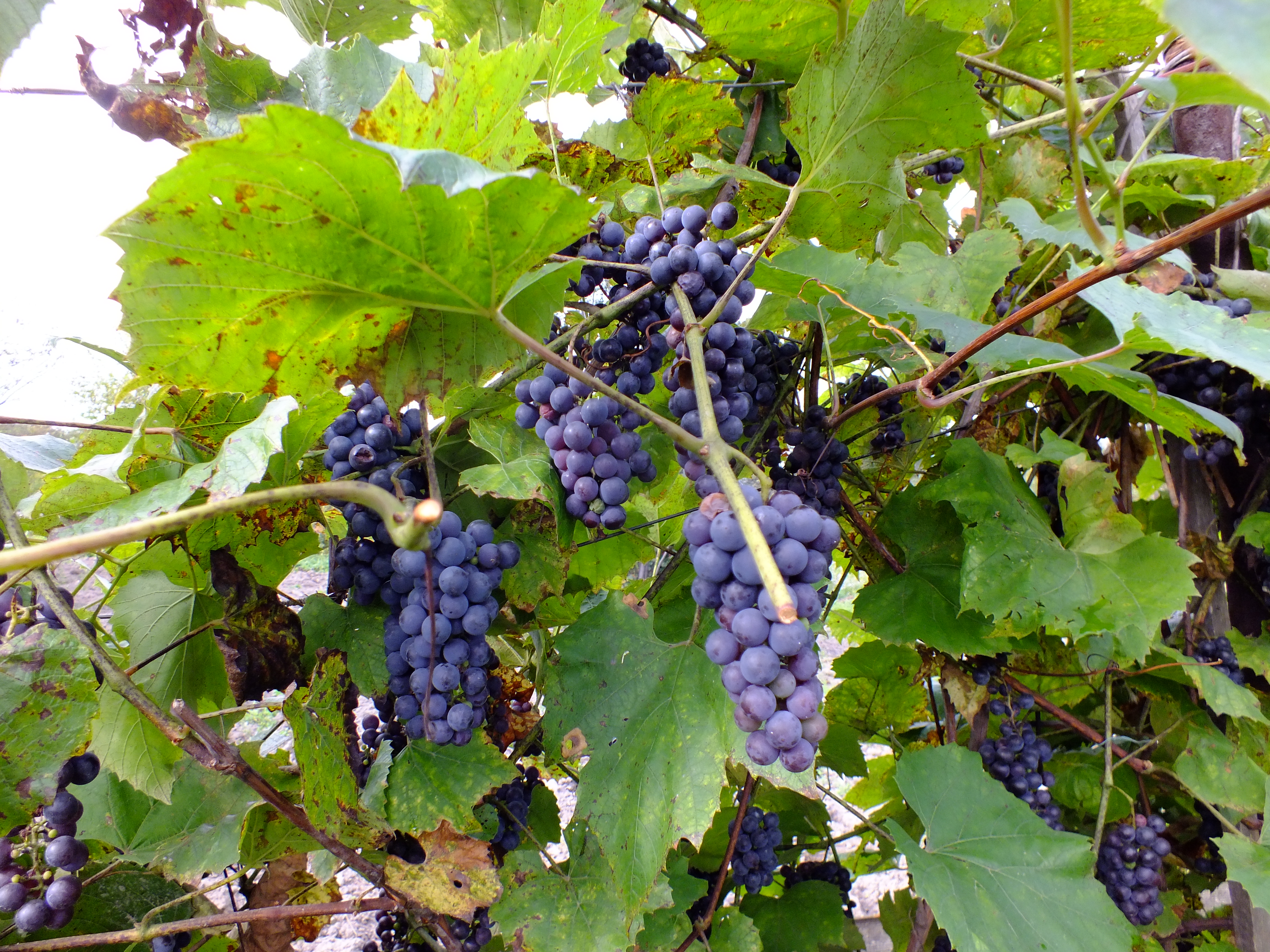

Scientific classification
- Kingdom: Plantae
- Clade: Embryophytes
- Clade: Tracheophytes
- Clade: Spermatophytes
- Clade: Angiosperms
- Clade: Eudicots
- Clade: Rosids
- Order: Vitales
- Family: Vitaceae
- Genus: Vitis
- Species: V. amurensis

Binomial name
- Vitis amurensis Rupr.

= Vitis amurensis =

Species of grapevine

Vitis amurensis, the Amur grape, is a species of grape native to the Asian continent. Its name comes from the Amur Valley in Russia and China.

It is very resistant to frost, but is not tolerant to drought. Selections vary, but as a species it has strong resistance to anthracnose and ripe rot, and moderately strong resistance to downy mildew and powdery mildew.

== Botanical description ==
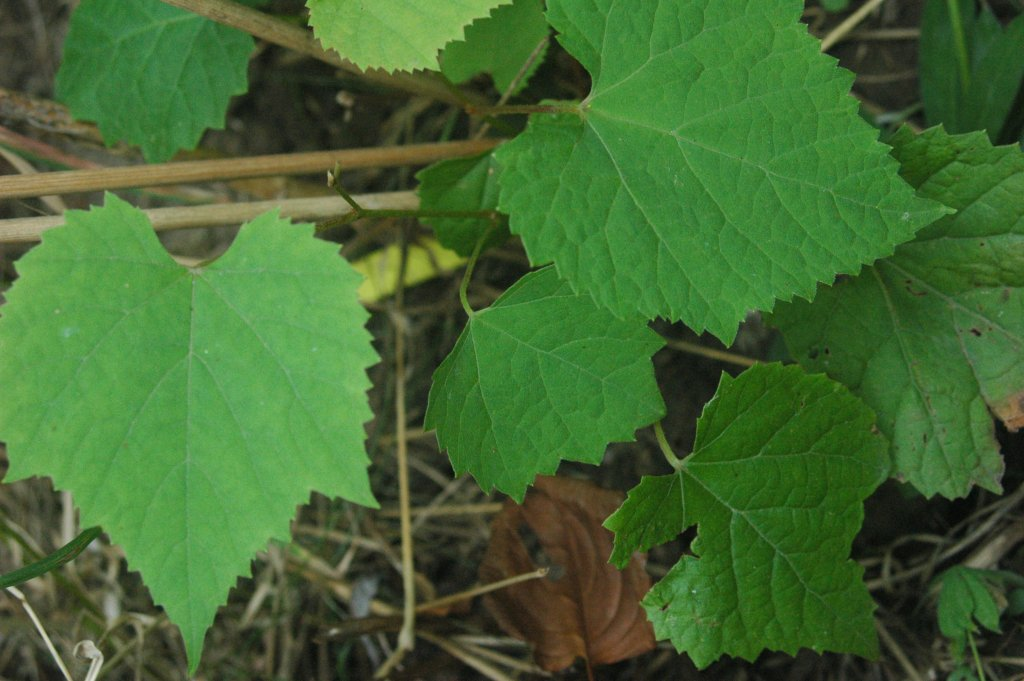
Leaves of Vitis amurensis

A vine with stem 5–10 cm in diameter and typically spreading to 15–18 m, rarely up to 20–25 meters. Tendrils capable of wrapping around things will entwine the branches of neighbouring plants or anything else they can use for support.

The bark is dark, scaly and with vertical stripes on old shoots. Young shoots are green, often with a reddish hue, reddish-brown in autumn.

The leaves vary greatly in shape. They can be solid, three- or five-lobed, ovate or rounded, arched at the base. The size ranges from 9 to 25 cm with sharp edges and rounded-triangular serrate teeth. The surface of the leaves are glabrous above, densely covered with short bristles. In autumn the leaves turn bright colours - red, yellow, orange, brown.

The flowers are small, and a nectar source for bees. They appear in the second week of May in its natural habitat.

The Amur grape is usually dioecious, although hermaphrodite vines do occur rarely.

Fruits of the Amur grape are spherical black or purple, sometimes dark blue berries ranging from very acidic to sweet, with a diameter in the main to 12 mm, with a thick skin. The sugar content in the fruit reaches 22-23%. In their natural habitat they ripen in late September. The flesh is juicy, the berries are usually sour. The clusters can be large, comparable to the number of berries. In exceptional cases, the length of bunches up to 25 cm, and with a weight of 250 grams (usually 20-70 g).

== Distribution and ecology ==
Vitis amurensis is a relic of pre-glacial subtropical vegetation of the Far East, it reaches the continental latitude Lake Kizi (about fifty-first parallel). Along the coast of the Sea of Japan to the north it reaches the mouth of the Muli river, and the Amur region to the west - to the river Zeya.

It grows in the forests of Manchuria, Amur Oblast, Primorsky Krai, North East China (Anhui, Hebei, Heilongjiang, Jilin, Liaoning, Shandong, Shanxi, Zhejiang), and Korea.

Amur grapes are classified into three varieties:

- V. amurensis var. amurensis
- V. amurensis var. dissecta
- V. amurensis var. yanshanensis

It is most common in the valleys of rivers and streams, in clearings, forest edges, forests, the lower and middle slopes of mountains, where they climb to trees and spread along the ground. It is the northernmost and most stable type of grape growing in the Far Eastern taiga.

Most grapes species are found in much warmer climates. Only the Amur grape can tolerate winter temperatures down to −45 °C, and the root zone of the soil to −16 °C.

Anthropogenic factors have adversely affected the number and status of the Amur grapes in their natural habitats, leading to a marked reduction in their range.

== Significance and use ==
Amur grapes are widely used as an ornamental plant for vertical gardening. They are normally cultivated as far north as St. Petersburg in European Russia where they are planted. They are also widely crossed with other grape species (usually V. vinifera) to produce cold hardy, early ripening wine and dessert grapes for cold climates.

They tolerate urban conditions (smoke, dust, gases).

Amur grapes require about 700 mm of rain a year, so do not perform well in dry climates typical of many wine regions unless irrigated. They are well suited to wetter areas usually considered too cool and wet for grapes such as North West Europe, Northern Russia and the Pacific Northwest. They are relatively resistant to disease, ripen early and are evolved to a short growing season and have some partial resistance to phylloxera. They can be eaten raw when ripe and are sweet (acidic and bitter when not fully ripe) but are often made into wine, juice, jellies and jams and the leaves can be used in a salad.

Amur grapes have a mild resistance to a few forms of mildew. Ripening capacity and growth rate of vines is very high, the annual growth is about 2.5 meters. Amur grape seedlings bloom at about the fifth year. The plant prefers loose acidic soil and cannot tolerate excessive lime. Amur grapes respond positively to the introduction of highly acidic peat. They fruit best in full sun. Some grape varieties resulting from crossing other species with Amur grapes are: 'Arctic', 'Buytur', 'Zarya severa', 'Currants Michurin', 'Metal', 'Russian Concorde', 'North', 'Black North' and 'Kurinka Russkaja' etc. - cultivated at present in northern vineyards.

Some notable hybrids with V. amurensis ancestry grown in Western Europe are "Zarya severa" and it's descendants Severny, Solaris and Rondo.

== History of cultivation ==
Samples of V. amurensis were made in the former USSR for studies into resistance to cold. Hybrid varieties from the cross V. amurensis x V.vinifera or V. labrusca x V. amurensis were obtained.

The first crop of V. amurensis was during the Japanese occupation of Manchuria (1931-1945). In Jilin in northeast China, the Japanese created the first wineries producing wine from wild grapes V. amurensis.

About 800 km to the south, the culture of the European vine (V. vinifera) is possible in the region of Beijing only if the vines are buried under a thick layer of earth in winter to protect them from extreme cold. Faced with this difficulty, the Japanese tried to take advantage of high resistance to cold of the wild vine in the region to produce wine. In 1936 the Changbaishan Winery Ltd was created and Tonghua Winery Ltd 1938. in the region of Jilin, west of Changbai Mountains near the North Korean border. The climate of this region can be characterized by long, cold winters and short, warm summers, with average January temperatures ranging from -14C to -40C. At the time, the basement of Changbaishan produced 40 tons of wine. In 1954, the Beijing Botanical Garden tried hybridizations of V. amurensis grape with the European vine. But the decisive step was taken when, in 1965, a wild vine hermaphrodite was discovered in the mountains a hundred miles from Changbeishan winery.

From there, the agricultural research institutes in the region of Jilin embarked on programs to improve the Amur grape, seeking to harness its cold resistance genes. There was an improvement of cultivars (intraspecific crosses) and hybridization with the best varieties of the European vine.

The hybrids were found to be lower in sugar than the European vine and higher in acidity, but further crosses have improved on this. Many crosses were also made in the Russian research stations to obtain new varieties resistant to cold and mildew.

== Chemistry ==
The oligostilbenes amurensin A, B, C, D, E, F, G, H, I, J, K, L and M can be found in V. amurensis.

== Gallery ==
Vitis amurensis

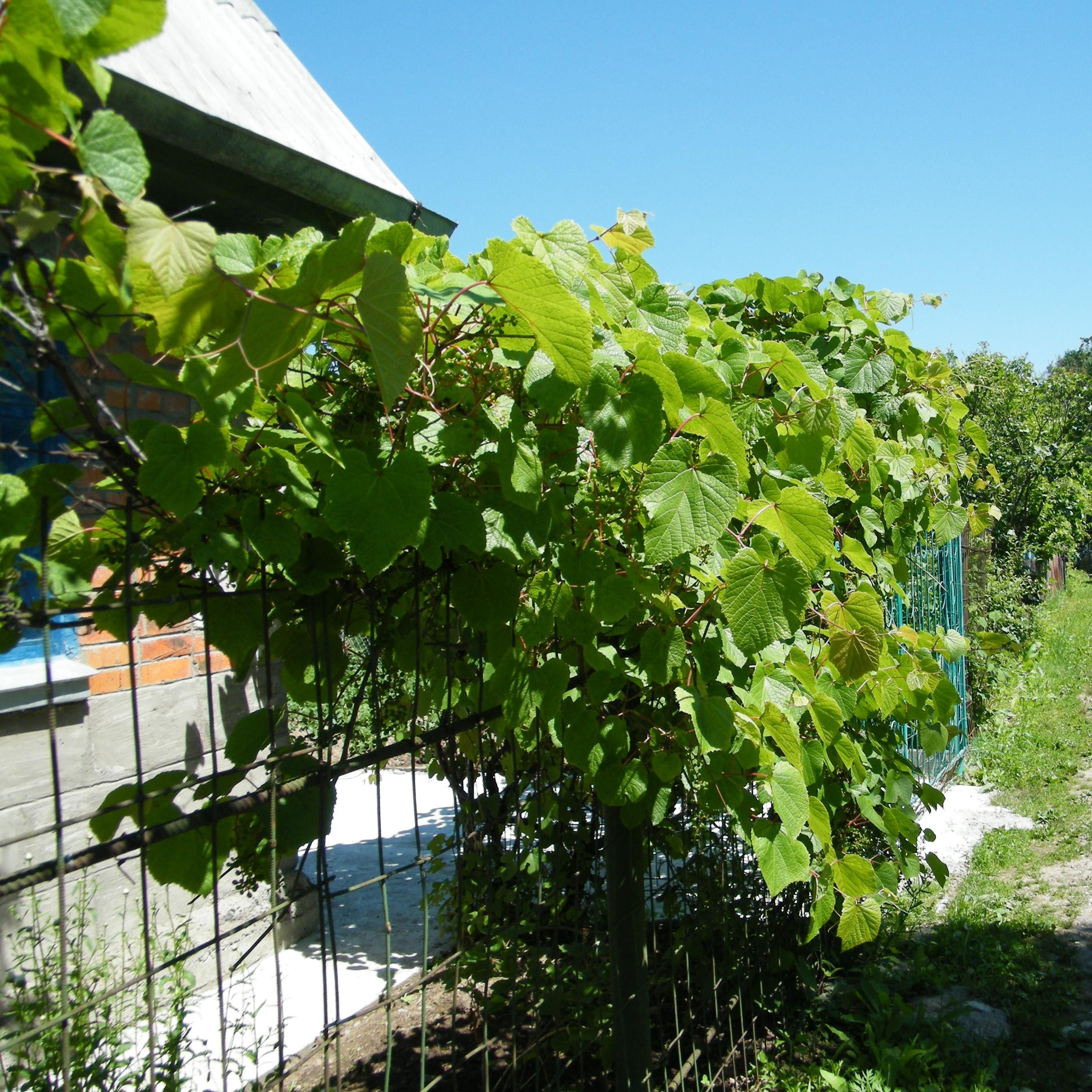

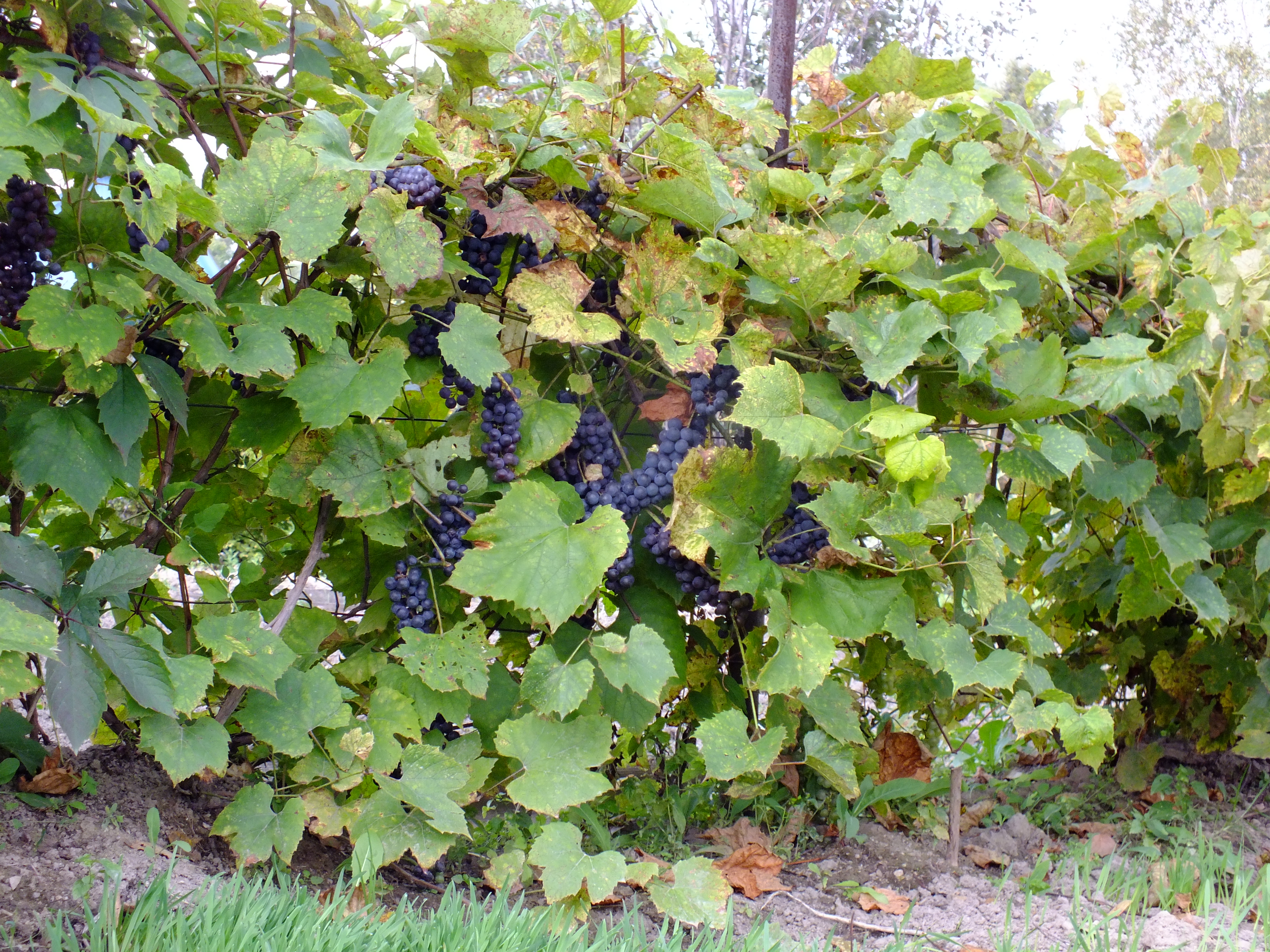

== See also ==
- Hybrid grapes
