= Amurensin E =

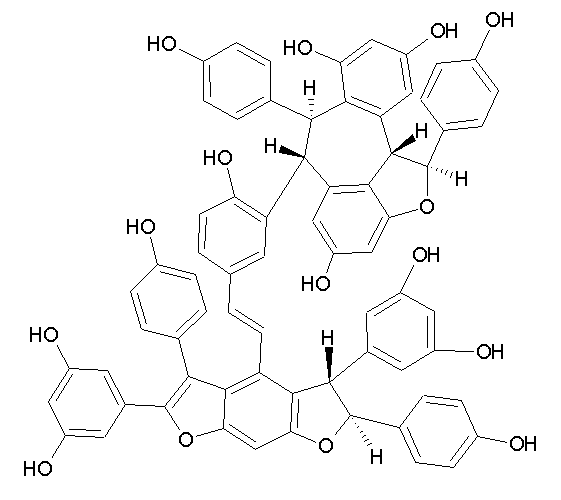
- Chemical structure of amurensin E

Names
- Preferred IUPAC name (2^{1}S,2^{6}R,2^{7}S,2^{11b}S,4E,6^{5}S,6^{6}S)-6^{5}-(3,5-Dihydroxyphenyl)-2^{7},6^{3},6^{6}-tris(4-hydroxyphenyl)-2^{1},2^{6},2^{7},2^{11b},6^{5},6^{6}-hexahydro-2(1,6)-benzo[6,7]cyclohepta[1,2,3-cd][1]benzofurana-6(4,2)-benzo[1,2-b:5,4-b′]difurana-1,7(1),3(1,3)-tribenzenaheptaphan-4-ene-1^{4},2^{4},2^{8},2^{10},3^{6},7^{3},7^{5}-heptol

Identifiers
| CAS Number | 265652-72-0 |
| 3D model (JSmol) | Interactive image |
| ChemSpider | 10230558 |
| PubChem CID | 16146730 |
| UNII | 2EL649XG52 |
| CompTox Dashboard (EPA) | DTXSID101031718 |
- InChI: InChI=1S/C70H50O15/c71-40-11-3-34(4-12-40)59-62(52-29-49(80)31-56-66(52)67(53-28-48(79)30-55(82)63(53)59)69(83-56)37-9-17-43(74)18-10-37)51-21-33(2-20-54(51)81)1-19-50-64-57(85-70(39-24-46(77)27-47(78)25-39)60(64)35-5-13-41(72)14-6-35)32-58-65(50)61(38-22-44(75)26-45(76)23-38)68(84-58)36-7-15-42(73)16-8-36/h1-32,59,61-62,67-69,71-82H/b19-1+/t59-,61+,62+,67+,68-,69-/m1/s1 Key: ZRYWKQSYNPQLCT-CTMVSHEZSA-N
- SMILES: C1=CC(=CC=C1[C@@H]2[C@H](C3=C4[C@@H]([C@H](OC4=CC(=C3)O)C5=CC=C(C=C5)O)C6=C2C(=CC(=C6)O)O)C7=C(C=CC(=C7)/C=C/C8=C9C(=CC1=C8[C@@H]([C@H](O1)C1=CC=C(C=C1)O)C1=CC(=CC(=C1)O)O)OC(=C9C1=CC=C(C=C1)O)C1=CC(=CC(=C1)O)O)O)O

Properties
| Chemical formula | C_{70}H_{50}O_{15} |
| Molar mass | 1131.14 g/mol |
- Except where otherwise noted, data are given for materials in their standard state (at 25 °C [77 °F], 100 kPa). Infobox references

Amurensin E is an oligostilbene found in Vitis amurensis. It is a pentamer of resveratrol.
