= Hopeanol =

Names
- IUPAC name Methyl (1'S,9'R)-3',5',11',13'-tetrahydroxy-9'-(4-hydroxyphenyl)-6,8'-dioxospiro[cyclohexa-1,4-diene-3,16'-tetracyclo[7.6.1.02,7.010,15]hexadeca-2(7),3,5,10(15),11,13-hexaene]-1'-carboxylate

Identifiers
CAS Number	8131-39-5
3D model (JSmol)	Interactive image
ChemSpider	10277817
PubChem CID	16049805
- InChI: InChI=1S/C29H20O9/c1-38-26(37)29-20-11-18(33)13-22(35)24(20)28(14-2-4-15(30)5-3-14,27(29)8-6-16(31)7-9-27)25(36)19-10-17(32)12-21(34)23(19)29/h2-13,30,32-35H,1H3/t28-,29+/m1/s1 Key: PBGSPYHKIMHMQD-WDYNHAJCSA-N
- SMILES: COC(=O)[C@@]12C3=C(C(=CC(=C3)O)O)[C@@](C14C=CC(=O)C=C4)(C(=O)C5=C2C(=CC(=C5)O)O)C6=CC=C(C=C6)O

Properties
Chemical formula	C_{29}H_{20}O_{9}
Molar mass	512.470 g·mol^{−1}
- Except where otherwise noted, data are given for materials in their standard state (at 25 °C [77 °F], 100 kPa). Infobox references

Hopeanol is a highly cytotoxic resveratrol-derivative with the molecular formula C_{29}H_{20}O_{9} which has been isolated from the bark of the tree Hopea exalata (now Hopea reticulata).
