= Trans-Resveratrol-3-O-glucuronide =

trans-Resveratrol-3-O-glucuronide

Names
- IUPAC name 3-Hydroxy-5-[(E)-2-(4-hydroxyphenyl)ethen-1-yl]phenyl β-D-glucopyranosiduronic acid
- Systematic IUPAC name (2S,3S,4S,5R,6S)-3,4,5-Trihydroxy-6-{3-hydroxy-5-[(E)-2-(4-hydroxyphenyl)ethen-1-yl]phenoxy}oxane-2-carboxylic acid

Identifiers
CAS Number	387372-17-0
3D model (JSmol)	Interactive image
ChemSpider	4437760
PubChem CID	5273285
UNII	LNK7Z424CK
CompTox Dashboard (EPA)	DTXSID20693973
- InChI: InChI=1S/C20H20O9/c21-12-5-3-10(4-6-12)1-2-11-7-13(22)9-14(8-11)28-20-17(25)15(23)16(24)18(29-20)19(26)27/h1-9,15-18,20-25H,(H,26,27)/b2-1+/t15-,16-,17+,18-,20+/m0/s1 Key: QWSAYEBSTMCFKY-OTPOQTMVSA-N; InChI=1/C20H20O9/c21-12-5-3-10(4-6-12)1-2-11-7-13(22)9-14(8-11)28-20-17(25)15(23)16(24)18(29-20)19(26)27/h1-9,15-18,20-25H,(H,26,27)/b2-1+/t15-,16-,17+,18-,20+/m0/s1 Key: QWSAYEBSTMCFKY-OTPOQTMVBZ
- SMILES: O=C(O)[C@H]3O[C@@H](Oc2cc(O)cc(\C=C\c1ccc(O)cc1)c2)[C@H](O)[C@@H](O)[C@@H]3O

Properties
Chemical formula	C_{20}H_{20}O_{9}
Molar mass	404.371 g·mol^{−1}
- Except where otherwise noted, data are given for materials in their standard state (at 25 °C [77 °F], 100 kPa). Infobox references

trans-Resveratrol-3-O-glucuronide is a metabolite of resveratrol with a sugar acid attached to a hydroxy group at the 3-position. The related compound, piceid, contains a sugar alcohol instead.

== Formation ==
A glucuronosyltransferase anzyme converts resveratrol to its glucuronide by adding a sugar acid at a specific phenolic hydroxy group, with uridine diphosphate (UDP) as byproduct:

resveratrol
+ UDP-glucuronate
UDP
resveratrol-3-O-glucuronide
