= Cyphostemma crotalarioides =

Scientific classification
- Kingdom: Plantae
- Clade: Tracheophytes
- Clade: Angiosperms
- Clade: Eudicots
- Clade: Rosids
- Order: Vitales
- Family: Vitaceae
- Genus: Cyphostemma
- Species: C. crotalarioides

Binomial name
- Cyphostemma crotalarioides (Planch.) Desc. ex Wild & R.B.Drumm.

Species of vine

Cyphostemma crotalarioides is a flowering plant species in the genus Cyphostemma found in Burkina Faso.

Cyphostemmin A and B can be found in the root of C. crotalarioides.
