= Amurensin A =

- Chemical structure of amurensin A

Names
- IUPAC name 5,5'-((3S,4S,Z)-4-hydroxy-1,4-bis(4-hydroxyphenyl)but-1-ene-2,3-diyl)bis(benzene-1,3-diol)

Identifiers
CAS Number	259536-16-8
3D model (JSmol)	Interactive image
ChemSpider	29432818
PubChem CID	92446988
UNII	ZT56Y3NP6M
- InChI: InChI=1S/C28H24O7/c29-20-5-1-16(2-6-20)9-26(18-10-22(31)14-23(32)11-18)27(19-12-24(33)15-25(34)13-19)28(35)17-3-7-21(30)8-4-17/h1-15,27-35H/b26-9+/t27-,28+/m0/s1 Key: GCORPFHXPBERCR-WFRBMYQMSA-N
- SMILES: OC1=CC(/C([C@@H]([C@H](O)C2=CC=C(O)C=C2)C3=CC(O)=CC(O)=C3)=C\C4=CC=C(O)C=C4)=CC(O)=C1

Properties
Chemical formula	C_{28}H_{24}O_{7}
Molar mass	472.48 g/mol
- Except where otherwise noted, data are given for materials in their standard state (at 25 °C [77 °F], 100 kPa). Infobox references

Amurensin A is an oligostilbene isolated from the roots of Vitis amurensis. It is a partially oxidized resveratrol dimer with a C8-C8' connection.
