= Cissus adnata =

Scientific classification
- Kingdom: Plantae
- Clade: Tracheophytes
- Clade: Angiosperms
- Clade: Eudicots
- Clade: Rosids
- Order: Vitales
- Family: Vitaceae
- Genus: Cissus
- Species: C. adnata

Binomial name
- Cissus adnata Roxb.

Synonyms
- Cissus pallida (Wight & Arn.) Steud.

Species of vine

Cissus adnata is a woody vine species in the genus Cissus found in Asia and Australia.

Pallidol is a resveratrol dimer found in C. pallida.
