= Stilbene synthase =

Stilbene synthase may refer to the following enzymes:

- Pinosylvin synthase (Pine stilbene synthase)
- Trihydroxystilbene synthase (Resveratrol synthase)
