= Piceid =

- Trans-piceid

Names
- IUPAC name 3-Hydroxy-5-[(E)-2-(4-hydroxyphenyl)ethen-1-yl]phenyl β-D-glucopyranoside
- Systematic IUPAC name (2S,3R,4S,5S,6R)-2-{3-Hydroxy-5-[(E)-2-(4-hydroxyphenyl)ethen-1-yl]phenoxy}-6-(hydroxymethyl)oxane-3,4,5-triol
- Other names Polydatin; Resveratrol 3-β-mono-D-glucoside cis-Piceid trans-Piceid; 3,5,4'-Trihydroxystilbene-3-O-β-D-glucopyranoside

Identifiers
CAS Number	27208-80-6
3D model (JSmol)	Interactive image
ChEBI	CHEBI:8198
ChEMBL	ChEMBL142652
ChemSpider	4445034
ECHA InfoCard	100.208.708
KEGG	C10275
PubChem CID	5281718
UNII	XM261C37CQ
CompTox Dashboard (EPA)	DTXSID001030555 DTXSID20897454, DTXSID001030555
- InChI: InChI=1S/C20H22O8/c21-10-16-17(24)18(25)19(26)20(28-16)27-15-8-12(7-14(23)9-15)2-1-11-3-5-13(22)6-4-11/h1-9,16-26H,10H2/b2-1+/t16-,17-,18+,19-,20-/m1/s1 Key: HSTZMXCBWJGKHG-CUYWLFDKSA-N; InChI=1/C20H22O8/c21-10-16-17(24)18(25)19(26)20(28-16)27-15-8-12(7-14(23)9-15)2-1-11-3-5-13(22)6-4-11/h1-9,16-26H,10H2/b2-1+/t16-,17-,18+,19-,20-/m1/s1 Key: HSTZMXCBWJGKHG-CUYWLFDKBI
- SMILES: OC1=CC(/C=C/C3=CC=C(O)C=C3)=CC(O[C@H]2[C@H](O)[C@@H](O)[C@H](O)[C@@H](CO)O2)=C1

Properties
Chemical formula	C_{20}H_{22}O_{8}
Molar mass	390.388 g·mol^{−1}
Appearance	White powder
- Except where otherwise noted, data are given for materials in their standard state (at 25 °C [77 °F], 100 kPa). verify (what is ?) Infobox references

Piceid is a stilbenoid glucoside and is a major resveratrol derivative in grape juices. It can be found in the bark of the Sitka spruce (Picea sitchensis), hence its name. It can also be isolated from Japanese knotweed (Reynoutria japonica).

Resveratrol can be produced from piceid by the mold Aspergillus oryzae, the mold used to make sake and soy sauce, as the fungus produces a potent beta-glucosidase.

trans-Piceid is the glucoside formed with trans-resveratrol, while cis-piceid is formed with cis-resveratrol.

trans-Resveratrol-3-O-glucuronide is one of the two metabolites of trans-piceid in rat.

Resveratrol glucoside from transgenic alfalfa prevents aberrant crypt foci in mice.

== See also ==
- Resveratroloside (3,5,4'-trihydroxystilbene-4'-O-β-D-glucopyranoside)
