= Aberrant crypt foci =

Clusters of abnormal tube-like glands in the colon and rectum

Aberrant crypt foci (ACF) are clusters of abnormal tube-like glands in the lining of the colon and rectum. Aberrant crypt foci form before colorectal polyps and are one of the earliest changes seen in the colon that may lead to cancer. ACF are, as opposed to normal epithelial cells, apoptosis resistant. When looking for aberrant crypt foci with microscopy, methylene blue is used as a staining agent. The resulting figure is fairly easy to detect under the microscope at low magnification (x40).

Chemically induced ACF in rodents have been used extensively to test chemicals and diets that might prevent colorectal cancer, and reported in more than 400 scientific articles. The "chemoprevention database" shows the results of all published scientific studies of chemopreventive agents, in people and in animals.

The relevance of ACF as a surrogate endpoint biomarker for cancer is controversial. Recently, several alternative precancerous lesions have been described (namely MDF, BCAC, and flat ACF), which might be better biomarkers than ACF.

Resveratrol glucoside from transgenic alfalfa has been used for the prevention of aberrant crypt foci in mice.
