= Abraham Jacobus Wendel =

Dutch lithographer, draughtsman and illustrator (1926–1915)

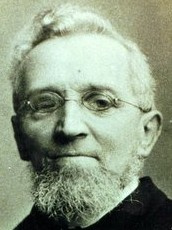
- Born: Abraham Jacobus Wendel; 31 October 1826; Leiden
- Died: 23 September 1915 (aged 88); Leiden
- Known for: lithography, botanical art

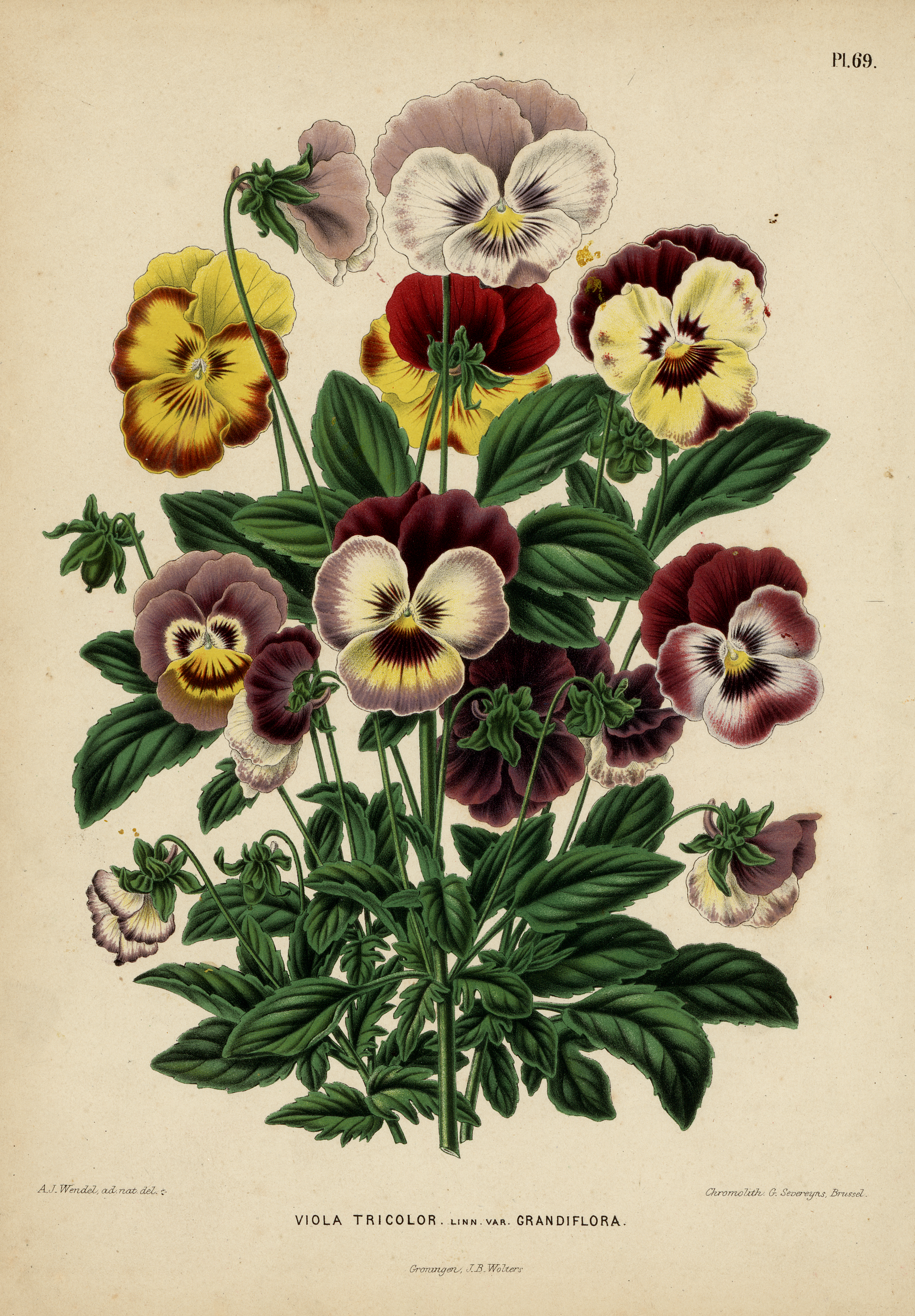
Viola tricolor by A.J. Wendel

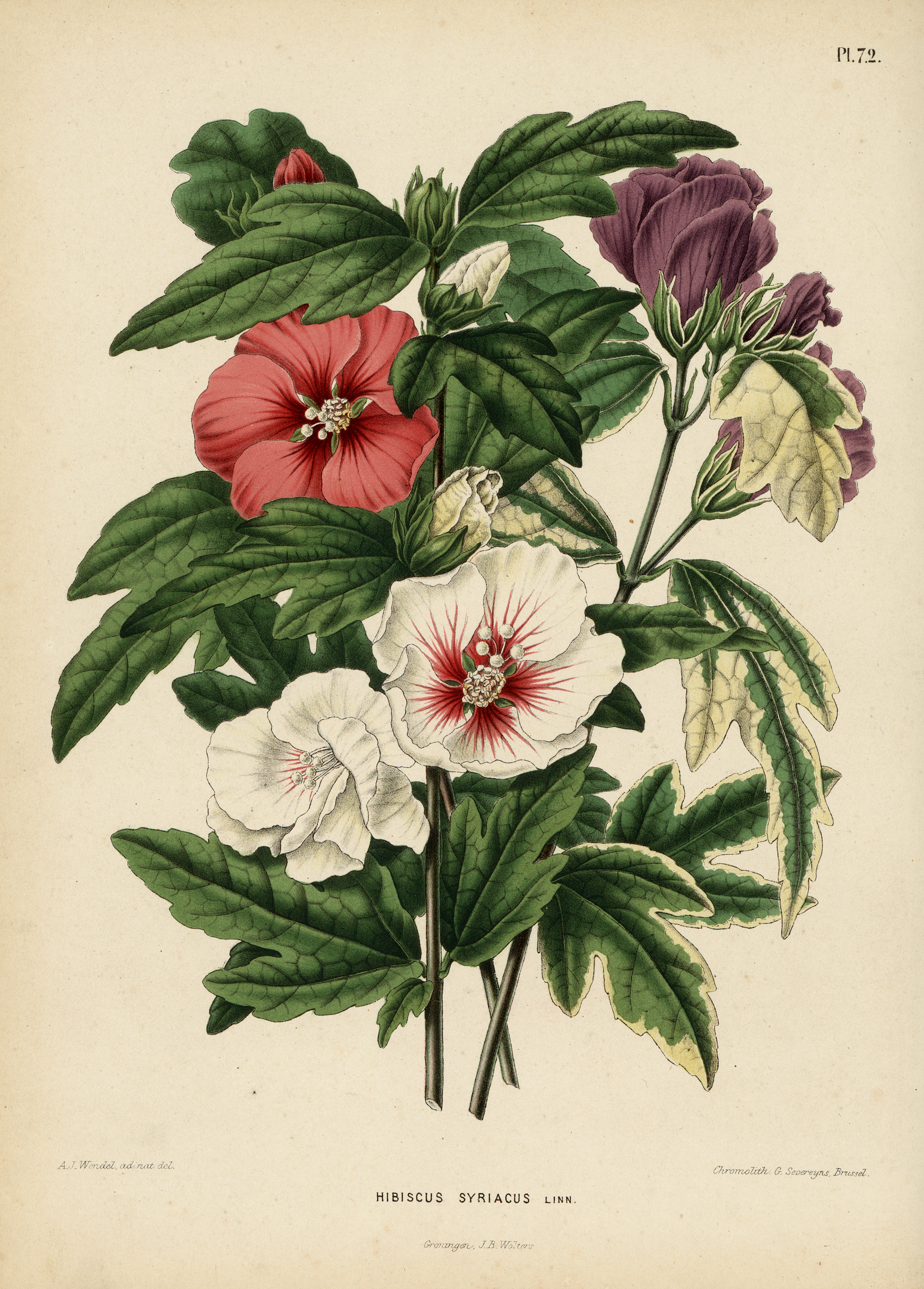
Hibiscus syriacus L. by A.J. Wendel

Abraham Jacobus Wendel (Leiden, 31 October 1826 – Leiden, 23 September 1915) was a Dutch lithographer, draughtsman and scientific botanical and paleontological illustrator using the signature AW and A. J. Wendel

== Life and work ==
Abraham Jacobus Wendel was born in 1826 in Leiden, the son of Jacobus Cornelis Wendel (1796-1860) and Johanna Vegt (1801-1869). In 1849 he married Jannetje Koolen (1826-1904) and had six children, including Abraham Jacobus Johannes Wendel (Leiden, 9 July 1854 - 3 April 1930), who became a lithographer and botanical artist in his own right, using signature AJJW. His father Abraham Jacobus Wendel created the botanical illustrations for many books and scientific journal articles. He was a lithographer with the printing house Arntz & Co. in Leiden, and made the illustrations for W. H. De Vriese et al. Descriptions et figures des plantes nouvelles et rares (1847). In 1887 he worked with Boek- en steendrukkerij P.W.M. Trap in Leiden: both Wendel and Trap are acknowledged in volumes 6 and 7 of the Annales du Jardin botanique de Buitenzorg (Ann.Jard.Bot.Btzg.).

== Publications ==
=== Books ===
Botanical and paleontological art, including:

- 1847: Vriese, Willem Hendrik de, Trap, Pieter Willem Marinus; Arnz, A. - Descriptions et figures des plantes nouvelles et rares : du Jardin Botanique de l'Université de Leide et des principaux jardins du royaume des Pays-Bas
- 1858: Blume, Carl Ludwig - Flora Javae et insularum adjacentium
- [1868]: Witte, H. and A.J. Wendel - Flora : afbeeldingen en beschrijvingen van boomen, heesters, éénjarige planten, enz., voorkomende in de Nederlandsche tuinen. Groningen: Wolters.
- 1879: Koster, Arie, Ottolander, K. J. W. et al. - Nederlandsche Flora en Pomona, beschreven en uitgegeven door het bestuur der Pomologische Vereeniging te Boskoop. (Redactie: K.J.W. Ottolander, A. Koster, C. de Vos.) Met platen naar de natuur geteekend door A.J. Wendel. Groningen: Wolters.
- [187-]: Prentenboek / Adelborst., Leiden: D. Noothoven Van Goor
- 1894: Dubois, Eugène - Pithecanthropus erectus: eine menschenähnliche Übergangsform aus Java. Batavia: Landesdruckerei., collaboration with his son Abraham Jacobus Johannes?

=== Portraits ===
- 1855: portrait van Antonius Niermeyer, university professor at Leiden University

=== Maps ===
- [1900]: Kaart van Zuid-Afrika (Map of Boer War South Africa) in F. Lion Cachet: De worstelstrijd der Transvalers [1900]

== Gallery ==
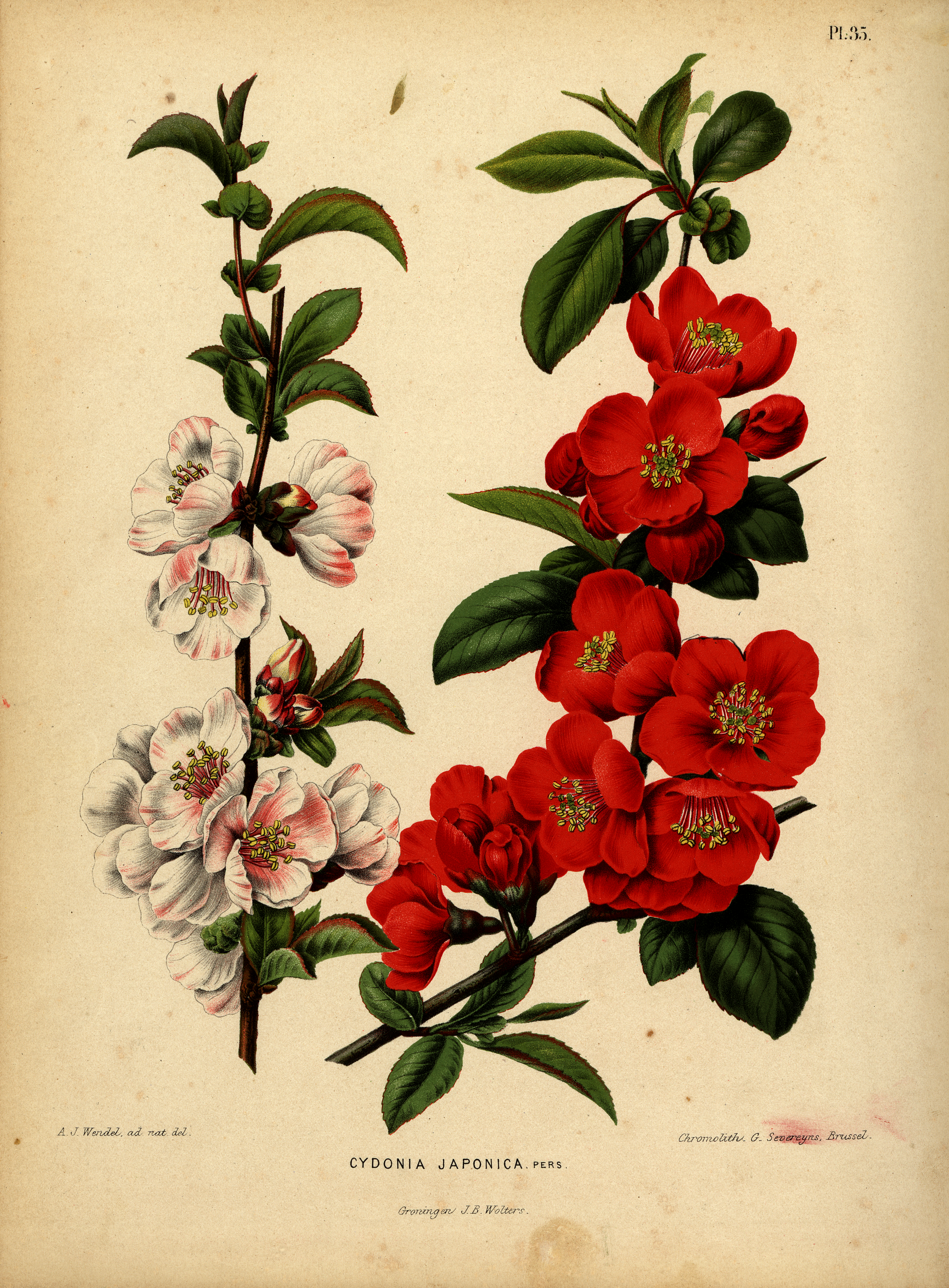
Chaenomeles speciosa by A. J. Wendel from his book with H. Witte: Flora: ... voorkomende in de Nederlandsche tuinen, [1868]

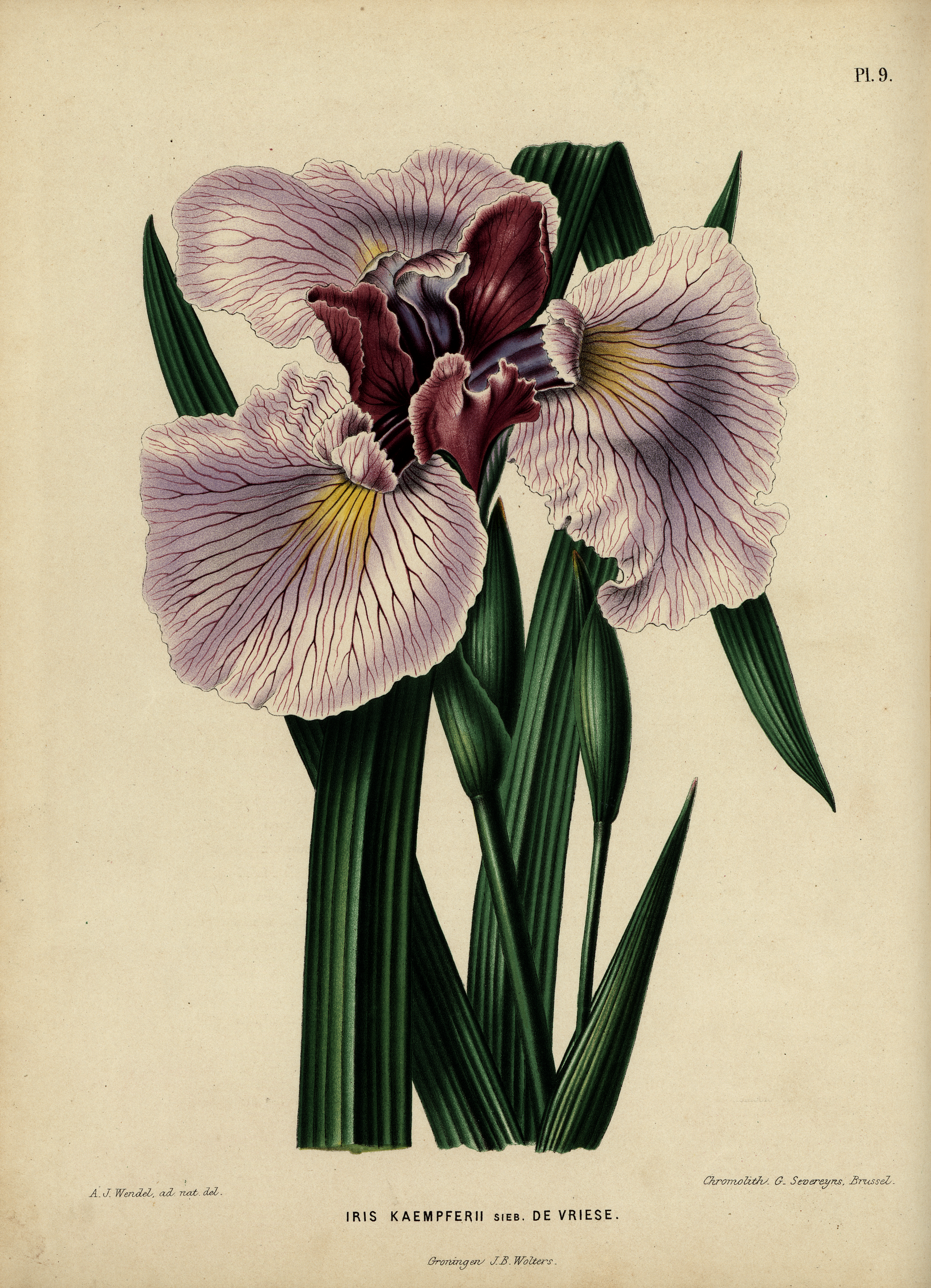
Iris ensata, idem, [1868]

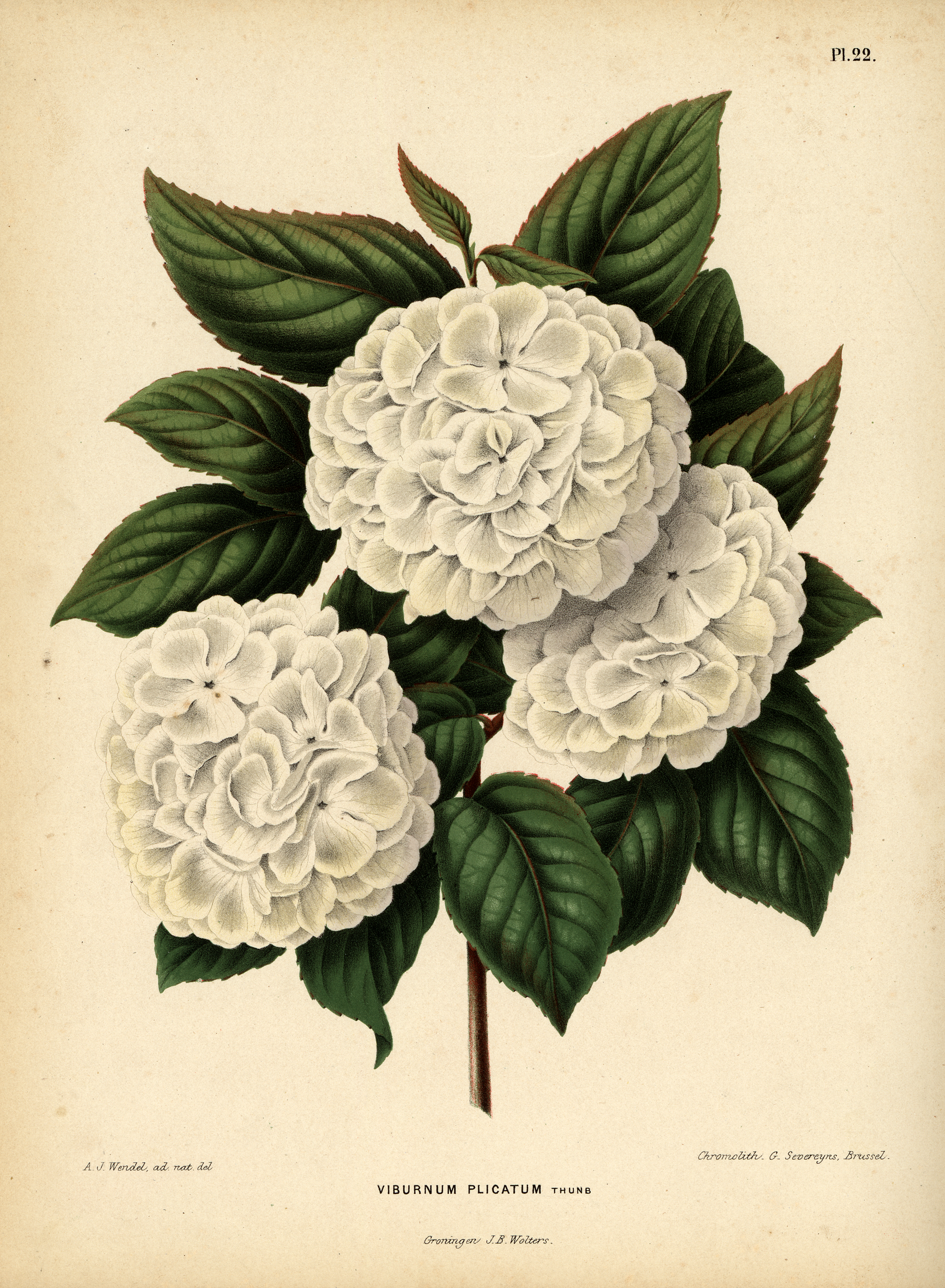
Viburnum plicatum, idem, [1868]

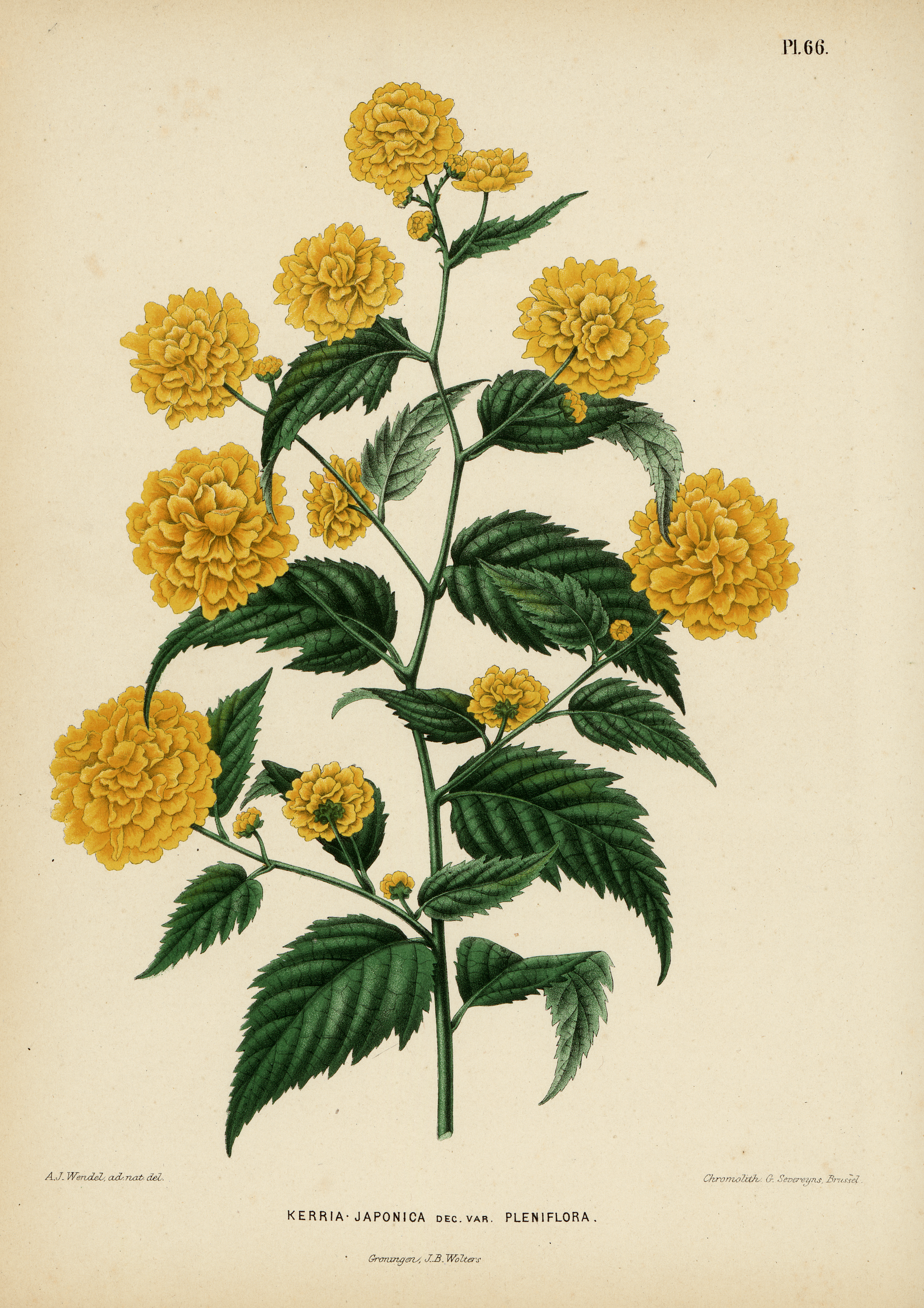
Kerria japonica, idem, [1868]

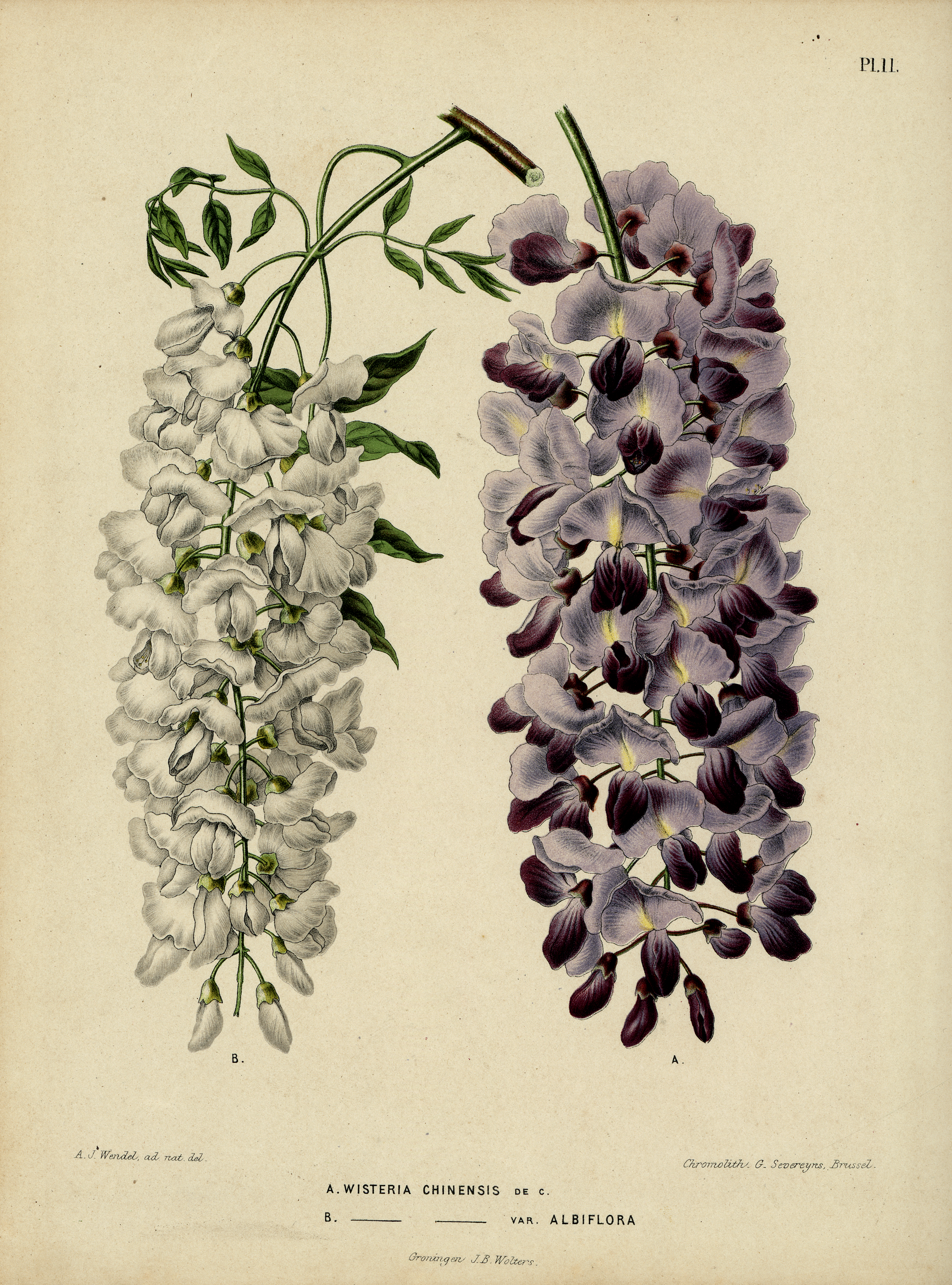
Wisteria sinensis, idem, [1868]

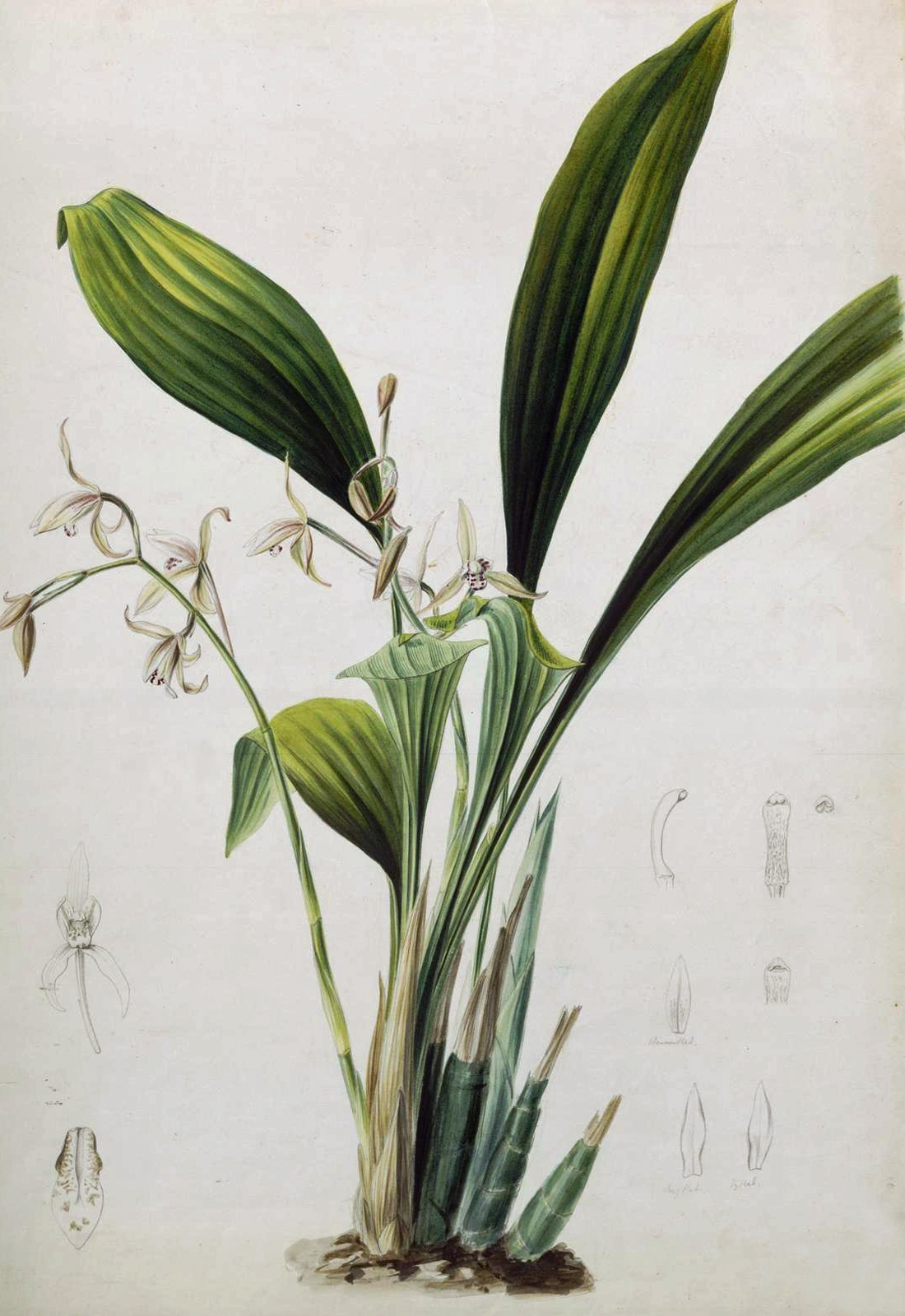
Cymbidium lancifolium by A. J. Wendel

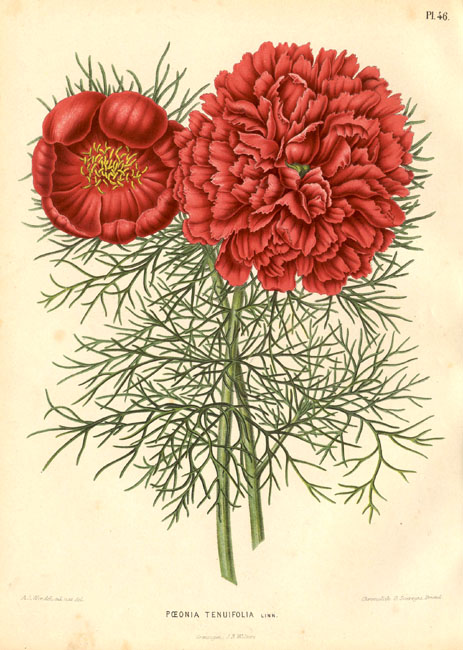
Paeonia tenuifolia by A.J. Wendel

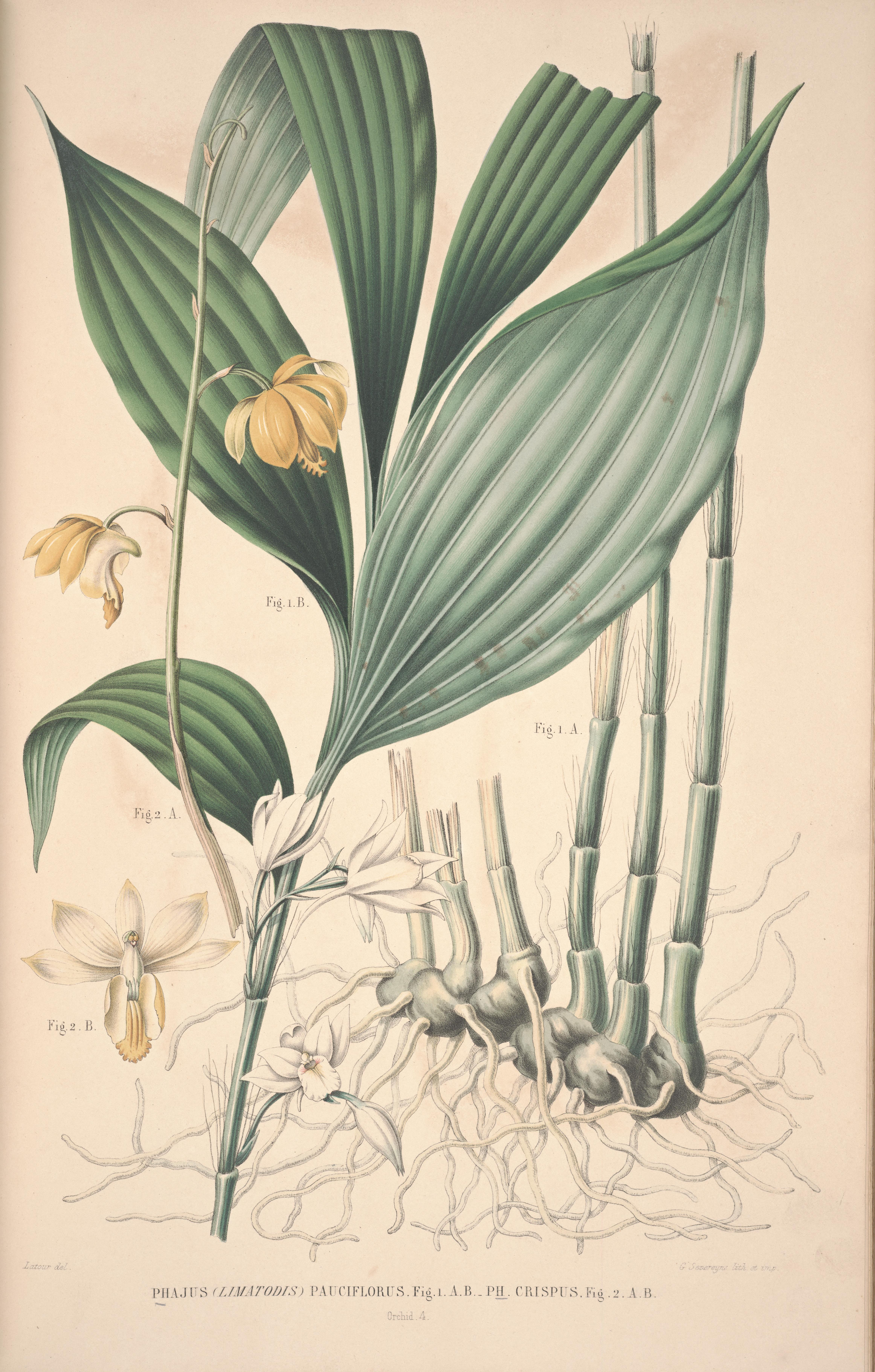
Orchid 2 from Carl Ludwig Blume Flora Javae et insularum adjacentium, 1858, by A.J. Wendel

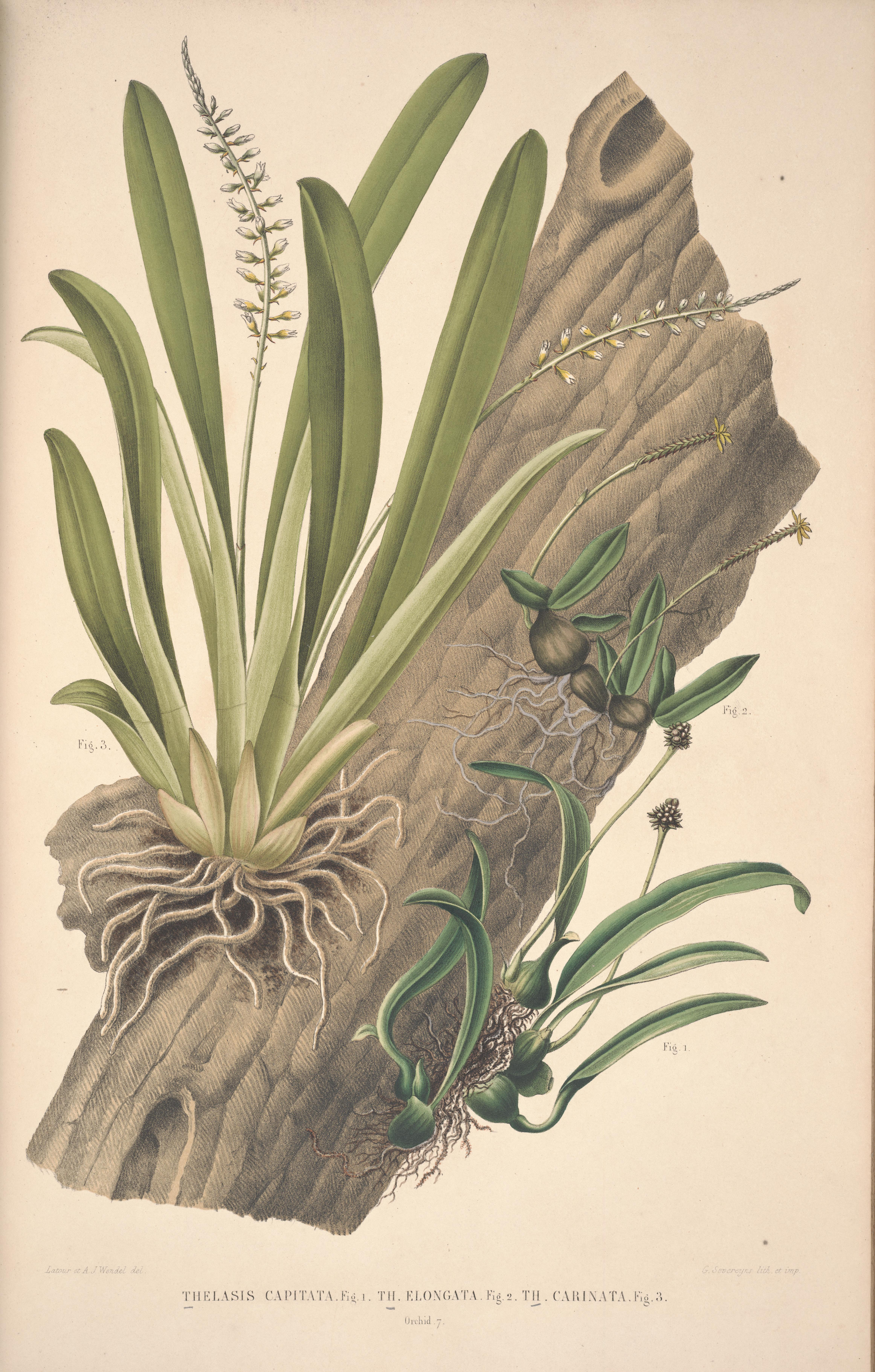
Orchid 5 idem

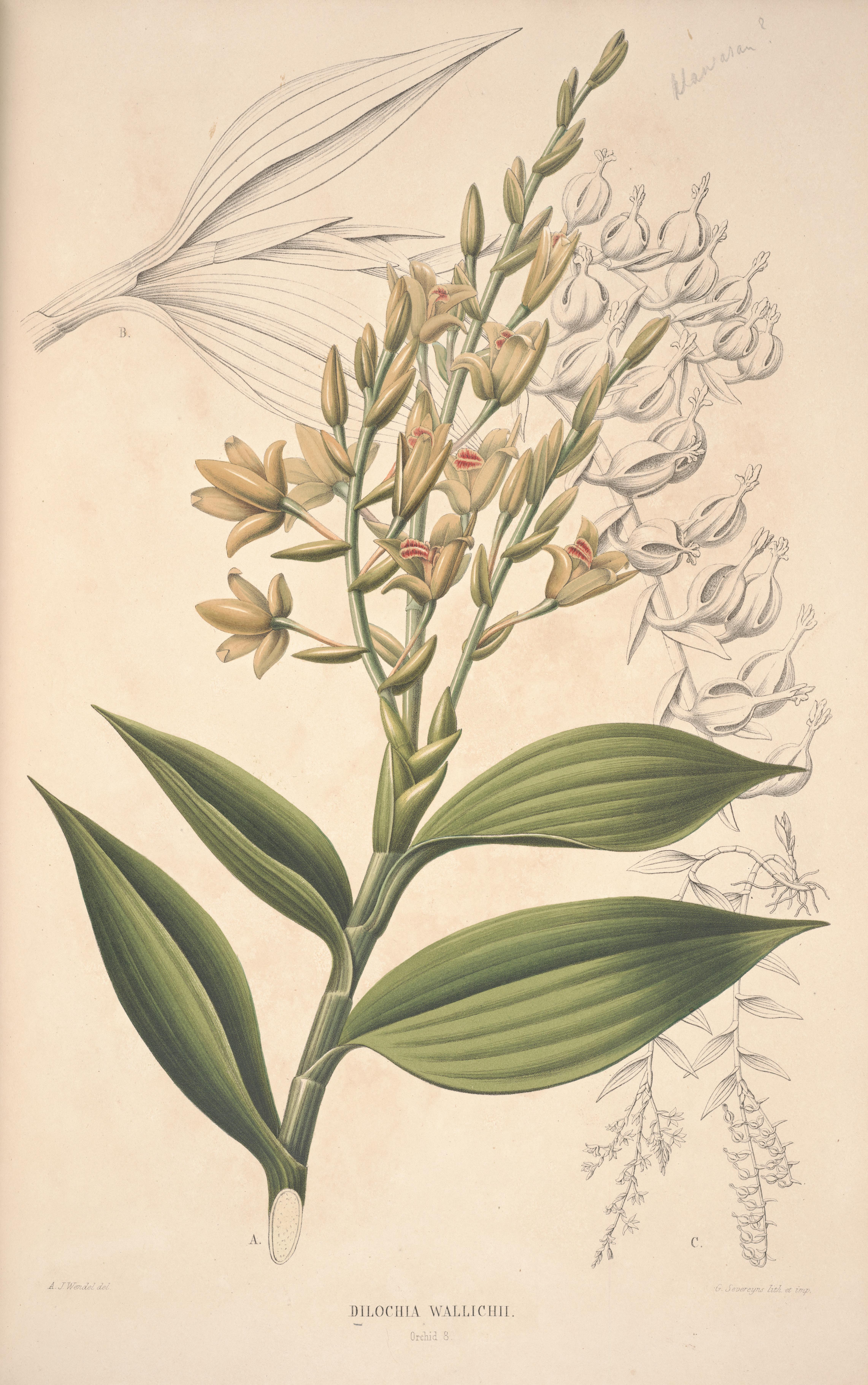
Orchid 6 idem

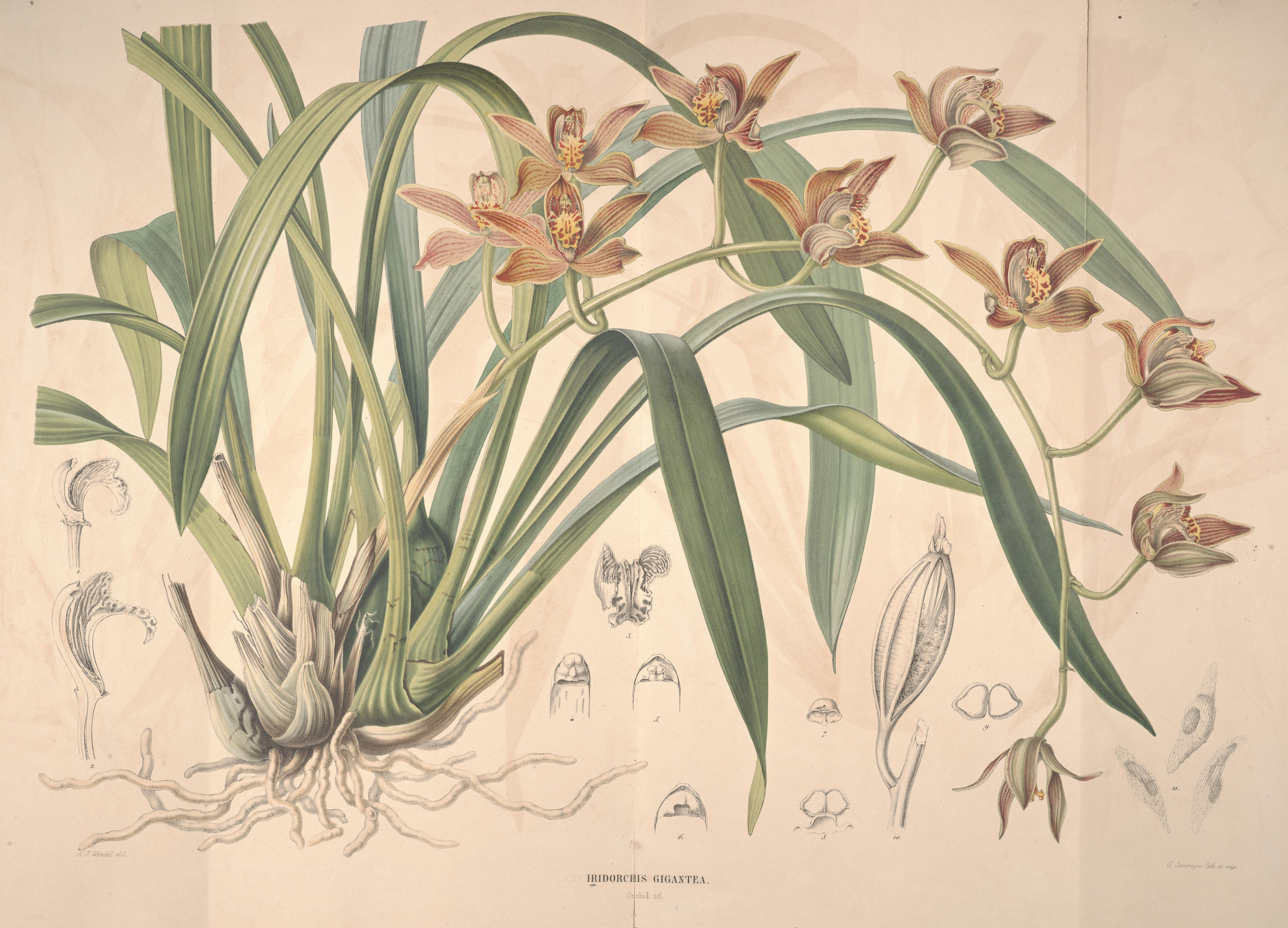
Orchid 28 idem

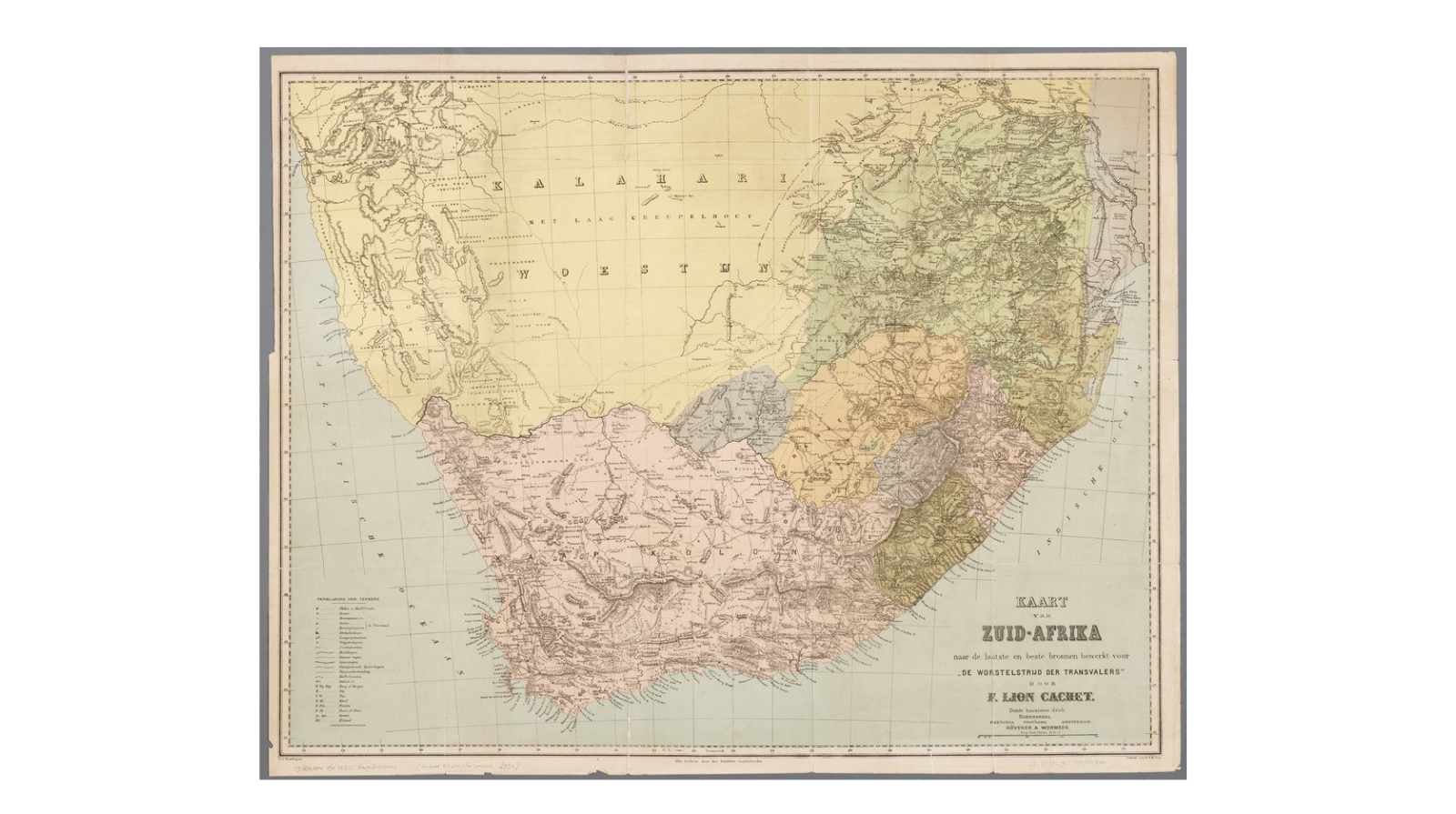
Kaart van Zuid-Afrika (Map of Boer War South Africa), by A.J. Wendel in F. Lion Cachet: De worstelstrijd der Transvalers [1900]
