= Trans-Diptoindonesin B =

trans-Diptoindonesin B

Names
- Preferred IUPAC name 5-{(2S,2′S,3S,3′S)-6-[(1E)-2-(3,5-Dihydroxyphenyl)ethen-1-yl]-6′-hydroxy-2,2′-bis(4-hydroxyphenyl)-2,2′,3,3′-tetrahydro[3,4′-bi-1-benzofuran]-3′-yl}benzene-1,3-diol

Identifiers
CAS Number	610757-17-0
3D model (JSmol)	Interactive image
ChEBI	CHEBI:76196
ChemSpider	26233611
PubChem CID	641676
UNII	YP28HR5FRG
CompTox Dashboard (EPA)	DTXSID90348943
- InChI: InChI=1S/C42H32O9/c43-27-8-4-24(5-9-27)41-38(26-16-31(47)19-32(48)17-26)40-35(20-33(49)21-37(40)51-41)39-34-15-22(1-2-23-13-29(45)18-30(46)14-23)3-12-36(34)50-42(39)25-6-10-28(44)11-7-25/h1-21,38-39,41-49H/b2-1+/t38-,39+,41+,42+/m0/s1 Key: BDJSWDYSJPVUJA-DVYDPXLZSA-N
- SMILES: OC1=CC(/C=C/C2=CC=C(O[C@H](C3=CC=C(O)C=C3)[C@H]4C5=CC(O)=CC6=C5[C@H](C7=CC(O)=CC(O)=C7)[C@@H](C8=CC=C(O)C=C8)O6)C4=C2)=CC(O)=C1

Properties
Chemical formula	C_{42}H_{32}O_{9}
Molar mass	680.709 g·mol^{−1}
- Except where otherwise noted, data are given for materials in their standard state (at 25 °C [77 °F], 100 kPa). verify (what is ?) Infobox references

trans-Diptoindonesin B is an oligomeric stilbenoid.

It is a resveratrol trimer. It can be isolated from Dryobalanops oblongifolia.
