= Cyphostemmin A =

Names
- IUPAC name 8-(3,5-dihydroxyphenyl)-6,7-bis(4-hydroxyphenyl)-5,8-dihydronaphthalene-1,3-diol

Identifiers
CAS Number	220328-15-4
3D model (JSmol)	Interactive image
ChemSpider	58226951
PubChem CID	100920620
CompTox Dashboard (EPA)	DTXSID501030536
- InChI: InChI=1S/C28H22O6/c29-19-5-1-15(2-6-19)24-12-18-11-23(33)14-25(34)27(18)28(17-9-21(31)13-22(32)10-17)26(24)16-3-7-20(30)8-4-16/h1-11,13-14,28-34H,12H2/t28-/m0/s1 Key: ZUOFIYSMCLKBAS-NDEPHWFRSA-N
- SMILES: c1cc(ccc1C2=C([C@@H](c3c(cc(cc3O)O)C2)c4cc(cc(c4)O)O)c5ccc(cc5)O)O

Properties
Chemical formula	C_{28}H_{22}O_{6}
Molar mass	454.478 g·mol^{−1}
- Except where otherwise noted, data are given for materials in their standard state (at 25 °C [77 °F], 100 kPa). Infobox references

Cyphostemmin A is an oligostilbene found in Cyphostemma crotalarioides (Vitaceae).

== See also ==
- Cyphostemmin B
