= Mulberroside A =

Names
- IUPAC name 3-{(E)-2-[4-(β-D-Glucopyranosyloxy)-2-hydroxyphenyl]ethen-1-yl}-5-hydroxyphenyl β-D-glucopyranoside
- Systematic IUPAC name (1^{2}S,1^{3}R,1^{4}S,1^{5}S,1^{6}R,4E,8^{2}S,8^{3}R,8^{4}S,8^{5}S,8^{6}R)-1^{6},8^{6}-Bis(hydroxymethyl)-2,7-dioxa-1,8(2)-bis(oxana)-3(1,3),6(1,4)-dibenzenaoctaphan-4-ene-1^{3},1^{4},1^{5},3^{5},6^{2},8^{3},8^{4},8^{5}-octol

Identifiers
CAS Number	102841-42-9
3D model (JSmol)	Interactive image
ChemSpider	4947470
PubChem CID	6443484
UNII	OJU5SVA08B
CompTox Dashboard (EPA)	DTXSID901030445
- InChI: InChI=1S/C26H32O14/c27-9-17-19(31)21(33)23(35)25(39-17)37-14-4-3-12(16(30)8-14)2-1-11-5-13(29)7-15(6-11)38-26-24(36)22(34)20(32)18(10-28)40-26/h1-8,17-36H,9-10H2/b2-1+/t17-,18-,19-,20-,21+,22+,23-,24-,25-,26-/m1/s1 Key: HPSWAEGGWLOOKT-VUNDNAJOSA-N
- SMILES: C1=CC(=C(C=C1OC2C(C(C(C(O2)CO)O)O)O)O)C=CC3=CC(=CC(=C3)OC4C(C(C(C(O4)CO)O)O)O)O

Properties
Chemical formula	C_{26}H_{32}O_{14}
Molar mass	568.52 g/mol
- Except where otherwise noted, data are given for materials in their standard state (at 25 °C [77 °F], 100 kPa). Infobox references

Mulberroside A is a stilbenoid found in Morus alba, the white mulberry. It is the diglucoside of oxyresveratrol.
