= Quadrangularin A =

Names
- Preferred IUPAC name (1E,2R,3R)-2-(3,5-Dihydroxyphenyl)-3-(4-hydroxyphenyl)-1-[(4-hydroxyphenyl)methylidene]indene-4,6-diol
- Other names (±)-Quadrangularin A

Identifiers
CAS Number	252557-25-8
3D model (JSmol)	Interactive image
ChEBI	CHEBI:76192
ChemSpider	4476724
PubChem CID	5318096
- InChI: InChI=1S/C28H22O6/c29-18-5-1-15(2-6-18)9-23-24-13-22(33)14-25(34)28(24)27(16-3-7-19(30)8-4-16)26(23)17-10-20(31)12-21(32)11-17/h1-14,26-27,29-34H/b23-9-/t26-,27+/m1/s1 Key: BIQMSWPBPAKGSE-PBSLAQMISA-N
- SMILES: C1=CC(=CC=C1C=C2C(C(C3=C(C=C(C=C23)O)O)C4=CC=C(C=C4)O)C5=CC(=CC(=C5)O)O)O

Properties
Chemical formula	C_{28}H_{22}O_{6}
Molar mass	454.478 g·mol^{−1}
- Except where otherwise noted, data are given for materials in their standard state (at 25 °C [77 °F], 100 kPa). Infobox references

Quadrangularin A is an oligostilbene found in Cissus quadrangularis and in Parthenocissus laetevirens. It is a resveratrol dimer.
