= Oxyresveratrol =

Names
- Preferred IUPAC name 4-[(E)-2-(3,5-Dihydroxyphenyl)ethen-1-yl]benzene-1,3-diol
- Other names 2,3',4,5'-Tetrahydroxy-trans-stilbene

Identifiers
CAS Number	29700-22-9
3D model (JSmol)	Interactive image
ChemSpider	4445033
ECHA InfoCard	100.108.380
KEGG	C10273
MeSH	C034912
PubChem CID	5281717
UNII	6V071CP5CR
CompTox Dashboard (EPA)	DTXSID801030442
- InChI: InChI=1S/C14H12O4/c15-11-4-3-10(14(18)8-11)2-1-9-5-12(16)7-13(17)6-9/h1-8,15-18H/b2-1+ Key: PDHAOJSHSJQANO-OWOJBTEDSA-N
- SMILES: C1=CC(=C(C=C1O)O)C=CC2=CC(=CC(=C2)O)O

Properties
Chemical formula	C_{14}H_{12}O_{4}
Molar mass	244.24 g/mol
- Except where otherwise noted, data are given for materials in their standard state (at 25 °C [77 °F], 100 kPa). Infobox references

Oxyresveratrol is a stilbenoid found in several plant species. It is found in only one gymnosperm (Gnetum hainensis), but in several angiosperm (particularly in the genera Artocarpus and Morus). Oxyresveratrol is found in the traditional Thai drug 'Puag-Haad', which is made from the heartwood of Artocarpus lakoocha. It is also the aglycone of mulberroside A, a compound found in Morus alba, the white mulberry.

Oxyresveratrol is a potent tyrosinase inhibitor, which also exhibits neuroprotective and antioxidant properties. It is being studied for potential applications in treating neurological diseases like stroke, Alzheimer's disease, and Parkinson's disease, as well as for its potential anticancer and antimicrobial effects. It is light sensitive, and will degrade on exposure to UV radiation.
