= Ampelopsin A =

- Chemical structure of (+)-ampelopsin A (+)-Ampelopsin A

Identifiers
CAS Number	(-): 280561-81-1; (+): 130608-11-6
3D model (JSmol)	Interactive image
ChEMBL	(-): ChEMBL1224886; (+): ChEMBL601296
ChemSpider	(-): 25051387; (+): 24651694
PubChem CID	(+): 182999
UNII	(-): S86WX55WAF
CompTox Dashboard (EPA)	DTXSID60156638
- InChI: InChI=1S/C28H22O7/c29-15-5-1-13(2-6-15)23-24-19(9-17(31)11-21(24)33)26-25-20(27(23)34)10-18(32)12-22(25)35-28(26)14-3-7-16(30)8-4-14/h1-12,23,26-34H/t23-,26-,27-,28+/m0/s1 Key: LHUHHURKGTUZHU-QWMXJGQVSA-N
- SMILES: Oc1ccc(cc1)C6c2c(cc(O)cc2O)C3c5c(cc(O)cc5OC3c4ccc(O)cc4)C6O

Properties
Chemical formula	C_{28}H_{22}O_{7}
Molar mass	470.477 g·mol^{−1}
- Except where otherwise noted, data are given for materials in their standard state (at 25 °C [77 °F], 100 kPa). Infobox references

Ampelopsin A is a resveratrol dimer found in Ampelopsis glandulosa var. hancei (formerly A. brevipedunculata var. hancei).
