= Pallidol =

- Chemical structure of pallidol

Names
- Preferred IUPAC name (4bR,5R,9bR,10R)-5,10-Bis(4-hydroxyphenyl)-4b,5,9b,10-tetrahydroindeno[2,1-a]indene-1,3,6,8-tetrol

Identifiers
CAS Number	105037-88-5
3D model (JSmol)	Interactive image
ChEBI	CHEBI:76173
ChemSpider	425065
PubChem CID	484757
UNII	QE5TL72TJ8
CompTox Dashboard (EPA)	DTXSID20727005
- InChI: InChI=1S/C28H22O6/c29-15-5-1-13(2-6-15)23-25-19(9-17(31)11-21(25)33)28-24(14-3-7-16(30)8-4-14)26-20(27(23)28)10-18(32)12-22(26)34/h1-12,23-24,27-34H/t23-,24-,27+,28+/m1/s1 Key: YNVJOQCPHWKWSO-ZBVBGGFBSA-N
- SMILES: C1=CC(=CC=C1C2C3C(C(C4=C(C=C(C=C34)O)O)C5=CC=C(C=C5)O)C6=CC(=CC(=C26)O)O)O

Properties
Chemical formula	C_{28}H_{22}O_{6}
Molar mass	454.47 g/mol
- Except where otherwise noted, data are given for materials in their standard state (at 25 °C [77 °F], 100 kPa). verify (what is ?) Infobox references

Pallidol is a resveratrol dimer. It can be found in red wine, in Cissus pallida or in Parthenocissus laetevirens.
