= Ampelopsin B =

Names
- IUPAC name (1S,7S,11bS)-1,7-Bis(4-hydroxyphenyl)-1,6,7,11b-tetrahydro-2-oxadibenzo[cd,h]azulene-4,8,10-triol
- Other names (+)-Ampelopsin B (−)-Ampelopsin B

Identifiers
| CAS Number | 130518-19-3 |
| 3D model (JSmol) | Interactive image |
| ChEBI | CHEBI:76191 |
| ChemSpider | 4476716 |
| PubChem CID | 5318088 |
| UNII | BX77KJ8J5L |
| CompTox Dashboard (EPA) | DTXSID80415734 |
- InChI: InChI=1S/C28H22O6/c29-17-5-1-14(2-6-17)21-10-16-9-19(31)13-24-25(16)27(22-11-20(32)12-23(33)26(21)22)28(34-24)15-3-7-18(30)8-4-15/h1-9,11-13,21,27-33H,10H2/t21-,27-,28+/m0/s1 Key: JJCVXDDMIRXVJA-YNOBPPCASA-N; InChI=1/C28H22O6/c29-17-5-1-14(2-6-17)21-10-16-9-19(31)13-24-25(16)27(22-11-20(32)12-23(33)26(21)22)28(34-24)15-3-7-18(30)8-4-15/h1-9,11-13,21,27-33H,10H2/t21-,27-,28+/m0/s1 Key: JJCVXDDMIRXVJA-YNOBPPCABK
- SMILES: Oc1ccc(cc1)[C@H]6c2c(cc(O)cc2O)[C@H]4c5c(cc(O)cc5O[C@@H]4c3ccc(O)cc3)C6

Properties
| Chemical formula | C_{28}H_{22}O_{6} |
| Molar mass | 454.478 g·mol^{−1} |
- Except where otherwise noted, data are given for materials in their standard state (at 25 °C [77 °F], 100 kPa). Infobox references

Ampelopsin B is a stilbenoid dimer found in Ampelopsis glandulosa var. hancei (formerly Ampelopsis brevipedunculata var. hancei).
