= Trihydroxystilbene synthase =

Class of enzymes

Identifiers
- EC no.: 2.3.1.95
- CAS no.: 128449-70-7

Databases
- IntEnz: IntEnz view
- BRENDA: BRENDA entry
- ExPASy: NiceZyme view
- KEGG: KEGG entry
- MetaCyc: metabolic pathway
- PRIAM: profile
- PDB structures: RCSB PDB PDBe PDBsum
- Gene Ontology: AmiGO / QuickGO
Search
- PMC: articles
- PubMed: articles
- NCBI: proteins

Trihydroxystilbene synthase (EC 2.3.1.95) is an enzyme that catalyzes the chemical reaction

coumaroyl-CoA
+ 3
malonyl-CoA
4 CO_{2}
resveratrol
+ 4 coenzyme A

The substrates of this enzyme characterised from peanut are one unit of coumaroyl-CoA and three units of malonyl-CoA. These combine to form one unit of resveratrol, with 4 units each of coenzyme A and carbon dioxide as byproducts.

This enzyme belongs to the family of transferases, To be specific those acyltransferases transferring groups other than aminoacyl groups. The systematic name of this enzyme class is malonyl-CoA:4-coumaroyl-CoA malonyltransferase (cyclizing). Other names in common use include resveratrol synthase, and stilbene synthase. This enzyme participates in phenylpropanoid biosynthesis.

== Structural studies ==
As of late 2007, two structures have been solved for this class of enzymes, with PDB accession codes 1Z1E and 1Z1F.
