= Cyphostemmin B =

Names
- Other names Quadrangularin A

Identifiers
CAS Number	220328-16-5
3D model (JSmol)	Interactive image
ChEBI	CHEBI:76192
ChEMBL	ChEMBL2335820
ChemSpider	4476724
PubChem CID	5318096
- InChI: InChI=1S/C28H22O6/c29-18-5-1-15(2-6-18)9-23-24-13-22(33)14-25(34)28(24)27(16-3-7-19(30)8-4-16)26(23)17-10-20(31)12-21(32)11-17/h1-14,26-27,29-34H/b23-9-/t26-,27+/m1/s1 Key: BIQMSWPBPAKGSE-PBSLAQMISA-N
- SMILES: c1cc(ccc1/C=C\2/c3cc(cc(c3[C@H]([C@@H]2c4cc(cc(c4)O)O)c5ccc(cc5)O)O)O)O

Properties
Chemical formula	C_{28}H_{22}O_{6}
Molar mass	454.478 g·mol^{−1}
- Except where otherwise noted, data are given for materials in their standard state (at 25 °C [77 °F], 100 kPa). Infobox references

Cyphostemmin B is an oligostilbene found in Cyphostemma crotalarioides (Vitaceae). It is a resveratrol dimer.

== See also ==
- Cyphostemmin A
