= Oligostilbenoid =

Chemical structure of hopeaphenol.

Oligostilbenoids (oligo- or polystilbenes) are oligomeric forms of stilbenoids. Some molecules are large enough to be considered polyphenols and constitute a class of tannins.

== Examples ==
=== Dimers ===
- Ampelopsin A
- Epsilon-viniferin
- Pallidol
- Quadrangularin A

=== Trimers ===
- α-Viniferin
- Ampelopsin E
- trans-Diptoindonesin B
- Gnetin H

=== Tetramers ===
- cajyphenol A
- cajyphenol B
- Flexuosol A
- Hemsleyanol D
- Hopeaphenol
- Vaticanol B
- R2-Viniferin (syn. Vitisin A)

=== Modified ===
- Diptoindonesin C can be isolated from the bark of Shorea pinanga

=== Other ===
- Diptoindonesin F can be isolated from the bark of Shorea gibbosa

== Glycosides ==
- Diptoindonesin A
