= List of compounds with carbon numbers 25–29 =

This is a partial list of molecules that contain 25 to 29 carbon atoms.

== C_{25} ==
| Chemical formula | Synonyms | CAS number |
|---|---|---|
| C_{25}H_{20} | tetraphenylmethane | 630-76-2 |
| C_{25}H_{22}ClNO_{3} | fenvalerate | 51630-58-1 |
| C_{25}H_{26}O_{3} | estrone benzoate | 2393-53-5 |
| C_{25}H_{27}ClN_{2} | meclozine | 569-65-3 |
| C_{25}H_{28}O_{3} | estradiol benzoate | 50-50-0 |
| C_{25}H_{28}O_{3} | etofenprox | 80844-07-1 |
| C_{25}H_{29}N_{3}O_{2} | metergoline | 17692-51-2 |
| C_{25}H_{31}FO_{8} | triamcinolone | 124-94-7 |
| C_{25}H_{32}ClN_{5}O_{2} | nefazodone | 83366-66-9 |
| C_{25}H_{32}N_{2}O_{2} | dextromoramide | 357-56-2 |
| C_{25}H_{32}N_{2}O_{2} | levomoramide | 5666-11-5 |
| C_{25}H_{33}NO_{4} | etorphine | 14521-96-1 |
| C_{25}H_{34}O_{2} | norethisterone dimethylpropionate | 65445-09-2 |
| C_{25}H_{34}N_{6}O_{3} | acetildenafil | 831217-01-7 |
| C_{25}H_{36}N_{6}O_{4}S | udenafil | 268203-93-6 |
| C_{25}H_{40}O_{2}Si_{2} | norethisterone pentamethyldisiloxyl ether | 71203-43-5 |
| C_{25}H_{49}N | pentacosanenitrile | 95960-95-5 |
| C_{25}H_{50}O_{2} | ethyl tricosanoate | 18281-07-7 |
| C_{25}H_{54}BrN | heptyltrihexylammonium bromide | 4328-15-8 |
| C_{25}H_{54}ClNO_{4} | heptyltrihexylammonium perchlorate | 5536-16-3 |
| C_{25}H_{54}IN | heptyltrihexylammonium iodide | 4328-14-7 |
| C_{25}H_{54}N_{2}O_{3} | triheptylammonium nitrate | 5187-77-9 |

== C_{26} ==
| C_{26}H_{12} | diindenochrysene radical | 169331-80-0 |
| C_{26}H_{14} | rubicene | 197-61-5 |
| C_{26}H_{15}N_{3}O_{7} | perylene picric acid | 42462-61-3 |
| C_{26}H_{16} | hexacene | 258-31-1 |
| C_{26}H_{16} | hexaphene | 222-78-6 |
| C_{26}H_{20}Sn | triphenyl phenylethynyl tin | 1247-08-1 |
| C_{26}H_{22}N_{4} | benzil phenylosazone | 572-18-9 |
| C_{26}H_{22}O_{2} | benzopinacol | 464-72-2 |
| C_{26}H_{26}F_{2}N_{2} | flunarizine | 52468-60-7 |
| C_{26}H_{26}O_{3}Si_{3} | dimethyltetraphenylcyclotrisiloxane | 1438-86-4 |
| C_{26}H_{28}O_{14} | apiin | 26544-34-3 |
| C_{26}H_{28}ClNO | clomiphene | 911-45-5 |
| C_{26}H_{28}N_{2} | cinnarizine | 298-57-7 |
| C_{26}H_{30}O_{11} | Phellamurin | 52589-11-4 |
| C_{26}H_{30}O_{12} | Amurensin | 641-94-1 |
| C_{26}H_{36}O_{3} | estradiol cypionate | 313-06-4 |
| C_{26}H_{36}O_{6} | bufotalin | 471-95-4 |
| C_{26}H_{37}NO_{2} | A-40174 | 26685-57-4 |
| C_{26}H_{40}O_{3} | testosterone enanthate | 315-37-7 |
| C_{26}H_{42}O_{4} | decyl octyl phthalate | 119-07-3 |
| C_{26}H_{43}NO_{6} | glycocholic acid | 475-31-0 |
| C_{26}H_{50}O_{4} | didecyl adipate | 105-97-5 |
| C_{26}H_{50}O_{4} | diisodecyl adipate | 27178-16-1 |
| C_{26}H_{52} | cyclohexacosane | 297-16-5 |
| C_{26}H_{52}O_{2} | ethyl tetracosanate | 24634-95-5 |
| C_{26}H_{52}O_{2} | cerotic acid | 506-46-7 |
| C_{26}H_{56}ClN | didodecyl dimethyl ammonium chloride | 3401-74-9 |
| C_{26}H_{56}ClNO_{4} | diheptyldihexylammonium perchlorate | 4312-63-4 |
| C_{26}H_{56}IN | diheptyldihexylammonium iodide | 4312-62-3 |

== C_{27} ==
| C_{27}H_{28}Br_{2}O_{5}S | bromothymol blue | 76-59-5 |
| C_{27}H_{30}O_{2} | norethisterone benzoate | 71203-39-9 |
| C_{27}H_{30}O_{5}S | thymolsulfonephthalein | 76-61-9 |
| C_{27}H_{30}O_{14} | violanthin | 40581-17-7 |
| C_{27}H_{30}O_{14} | kaempferitrin | 482-38-2 |
| C_{27}H_{30}O_{14} | spherobioside | 64-17-5 |
| C_{27}H_{30}O_{16} | Rutin | 153-18-4 |
| C_{27}H_{31}O_{15} | Antirrhinin | 18719-76-1 |
| C_{27}H_{31}O_{16}^{+} | Tulipanin | 15674-58-5 |
| C_{27}H_{32}O_{14} | Naringin | 10236-47-2 |
| C_{27}H_{33}B | trimesitylborane | 7297-95-2 |
| C_{27}H_{38}N_{2}O_{4} | verapamil | 52-53-9 |
| C_{27}H_{38}O_{2} | norethisterone heptanoate | 3836-23-5 |
| C_{27}H_{39}NO_{3} | jervine | 469-59-0 |
| C_{27}H_{40}N_{2}O_{2} | isooctylhydrocupreine | 130-87-0 |
| C_{27}H_{40}O_{3} | testosterone cypionate | 58-20-8 |
| C_{27}H_{41}NO | solasodiene | 3669-17-8 |
| C_{27}H_{41}NO_{6} | hydrocortamate | 76-47-1 |
| C_{27}H_{42}O_{3} | diosgenin | 512-04-9 |
| C_{27}H_{42}ClNO_{2} | benzethonium chloride | 121-54-0 |
| C_{27}H_{43}NO | solanidine | 80-78-4 |
| C_{27}H_{43}NO_{2} | solasodine | 126-17-0 |
| C_{27}H_{44}O | cholecalciferol | 67-97-0 |
| C_{27}H_{44}O | desmosterol | 313-04-2 |
| C_{27}H_{44}O | previtamin D3 | 1173-13-3 |
| C_{27}H_{44}O_{2} | 7-ketocholesterol | 566-28-9 |
| C_{27}H_{44}O_{3} | tigogenin | 77-60-1 |
| C_{27}H_{44}O_{4} | gitogenin | 6811-13-8 |
| C_{27}H_{45}NO | demissidine | 474-08-8 |
| C_{27}H_{45}NO_{2} | tomatidine | 77-59-8 |
| C_{27}H_{46} | cholestene | |
| C_{27}H_{46}O | cholesterol | 57-88-5 |
| C_{27}H_{46}O_{2} | 7-alpha-hydroxycholesterol | 566-26-7 |
| C_{27}H_{48} | cholestane | 481-21-0 |
| C_{27}H_{48} | cholestane | 14982-53-7 |
| C_{27}H_{48}O | coprostanol | 360-68-9 |
| C_{27}H_{50}O_{6} | glycerol tricaprylate | 538-23-8 |
| C_{27}H_{52}O_{4} | monodocosyl glutarate | 94278-12-3 |
| C_{27}H_{54} | cycloheptacosane | 297-23-4 |
| C_{27}H_{54}O_{2} | cerotic acid methyl ester | 5802-82-4 |
| C_{27}H_{57}N | trinonylamine | 2044-22-6 |
| C_{27}H_{58}BrN | trioctylpropylammonium bromide | 24298-17-7 |

== C_{28} ==
| C_{28}H_{12}Cl_{2}N_{2}O_{4} | c.i. vat blue 6 | 130-20-1 |
| C_{28}H_{20} | anthracene photodimer | 1627-06-1 |
| C_{28}H_{20}O_{2} | glyceryl monostearate | 31566-31-1 |
| C_{28}H_{27}ClF_{5}NO | penfluridol | 26864-56-2 |
| C_{28}H_{28}N_{2}O_{2} | difenoxin | 28782-42-5 |
| C_{28}H_{29}F_{2}N_{3}O | pimozide | 2062-78-4 |
| C_{28}H_{31}ClN_{2}O_{3} | Rhodamine B | 81-88-9 |
| C_{28}H_{32}FNO_{2} | A-41988 | 52763-30-1 |
| C_{28}H_{32}O_{4}Si_{4} | tetramethyltetraphenylcyclotetrasiloxane | 77-63-4 |
| C_{28}H_{32}O_{15} | Diosmin | 520-27-4 |
| C_{28}H_{33}ClN_{2} | buclizine | 82-95-1 |
| C_{28}H_{34}O_{14} | Poncirin | 14941-08-3 |
| C_{28}H_{34}O_{15} | Hesperidin | 520-26-3 |
| C_{28}H_{38}N_{8}O_{5}S_{2} | nitrosoprodenafil | |
| C_{28}H_{44}O | ergocalciferol | 50-14-6 |
| C_{28}H_{44}O | ergosterol | 57-87-4 |
| C_{28}H_{45}ClO_{2} | cholestryl chloroformate | 7144-08-3 |
| C_{28}H_{46}O | brassicasterol | 474-67-9 |
| C_{28}H_{46}O_{2} | cholesteryl formate | 4351-55-7 |
| C_{28}H_{46}O_{4} | diisodecyl phthalate | 26761-40-0 |
| C_{28}H_{48}O | campesterol | 474-62-4 |
| C_{28}H_{52}O_{12} | sucrose monopalmitate | 13039-41-3 |
| C_{28}H_{53}SO_{7}Na | didodecyl sodium sulphonatosuccinate | 4229-35-0 |
| C_{28}H_{53}NO_{5} | flexo plasticizer 8n8 | 134-67-8 |
| C_{28}H_{54}HgO_{4} | mercuric tetradecanoate | 36215-49-3 |
| C_{28}H_{56} | cyclooctacosane | 297-24-5 |
| C_{28}H_{56}O_{2} | ethyl hexacosanate | 29030-81-7 |
| C_{28}H_{58} | octacosane | 630-02-4 |
| C_{28}H_{60}BrN | tetraheptylammonium bromide | 4368-51-8 |
| C_{28}H_{60}ClN | methyl trinonylammonium chloride | |
| C_{28}H_{60}ClNO_{4} | tetraheptylammonium perchlorate | 4312-65-6 |
| C_{28}H_{60}IN | tetraheptylammonium iodide | 3535-83-9 |

== C_{29} ==
| C_{29}H_{20}O | tetraphenylcyclopentadienone | 479-33-4 |
| C_{29}H_{35}FO_{10} | triamcinolone diacetate | 67-78-7 |
| C_{29}H_{35}O_{17} | Malvin | 16727-30-3 |
| C_{29}H_{41}O_{2} | galvinoxyl radical | 2370-18-5 |
| C_{29}H_{44}O_{12} | ouabain | 630-60-4 |
| C_{29}H_{46}O_{2} | desmosterol acetate | 2665-04-5 |
| C_{29}H_{46}O_{2} | zymosterol acetate | 2579-07-9 |
| C_{29}H_{48}O | chondrillasterol | 481-17-4 |
| C_{29}H_{48}O | fucosterol | 17605-67-3 |
| C_{29}H_{48}O | isofucosterol | 481-14-1 |
| C_{29}H_{48}O | α-Spinasterol | 481-18-5 |
| C_{29}H_{48}O | stigmasterol | 83-48-7 |
| C_{29}H_{48}O_{2} | cholesteryl acetate | 604-35-3 |
| C_{29}H_{50}O_{2} | cholestanol acetate | 4947-63-1 |
| C_{29}H_{50}O_{2} | epicoprostanol acetate | 104757-70-2 |
| C_{29}H_{52}O | stigmastanol | 19466-47-8 |
| C_{29}H_{58}O_{2} | methyl octacosanoate | 55682-92-3 |
| C_{29}H_{58}O_{2} | nonacosanoic acid | 4250-38-8 |

== See also ==
- Carbon number
