= C29H48O =

The molecular formula C_{29}H_{48}O (molar mass: 412.69 g/mol) may refer to:

- Avenasterol, a sterol
- Chondrillasterol, a sterol
- Clerosterol, a sterol
- 7-Dehydrositosterol, a sterol
- Fucosterol, an algal sterol
- Isofucosterol, an algal sterol
- 24-Methylenelophenol, a sterol
- 4α-Methylfecosterol, a sterol
- Norcycloartenol, a phytosterol
- 29-Norlanosterol, a sterol
- Spinasterol, a phytosterol
- Stigmasterol, an unsaturated plant sterol
- Vitamin D_{5}, a form of vitamin D
