= Stigmastanol =

Names
- IUPAC name 5α-Stigmastan-3β-ol
- Systematic IUPAC name (1R,3aS,3bR,5aS,7S,9aS,9bS,11aR)-1-[(2R,5R)-5-Ethyl-6-methylheptan-2-yl]-9a,11a-dimethylhexadecahydro-1H-cyclopenta[a]phenanthren-7-ol
- Other names (3β)-Stigmastan-3-ol; (3β,5α)-Stigmastan-3-ol; β-Sitostanol; Dihydrositosterin; Dihydrositosterol; Dihydro-β-sitosterol; Fucostanol; Spinastanol; 24α-Ethylcholestanol

Identifiers
CAS Number	19466-47-8; 83-45-4
3D model (JSmol)	Interactive image
ChEBI	CHEBI:89400
ChEMBL	ChEMBL252364
ChemSpider	13078158
ECHA InfoCard	100.001.345
PubChem CID	15559396
UNII	C2NJ9WO6O7
CompTox Dashboard (EPA)	DTXSID201016169
- InChI: InChI=1S/C29H52O/c1-7-21(19(2)3)9-8-20(4)25-12-13-26-24-11-10-22-18-23(30)14-16-28(22,5)27(24)15-17-29(25,26)6/h19-27,30H,7-18H2,1-6H3/t20-,21-,22?,23+,24+,25-,26+,27+,28+,29-/m1/s1 Key: LGJMUZUPVCAVPU-KZXGMYDKSA-N
- SMILES: O[C@H]1CC[C@@]2(C)[C@](CC[C@]3([H])[C@]2([H])CC[C@@]4(C)[C@@]3([H])CC[C@]4([H])[C@@H](CC[C@@H](CC)C(C)C)C)([H])C1

Properties
Chemical formula	C_{29}H_{52}O
Molar mass	416.734 g·mol^{−1}
Boiling point	139.4 to 139.8 °C (282.9 to 283.6 °F; 412.5 to 412.9 K)
- Except where otherwise noted, data are given for materials in their standard state (at 25 °C [77 °F], 100 kPa). Infobox references

Stigmastanol (sitostanol) is a phytosterol found in a variety of plant sources. Similar to sterol esters and stanol esters, stigmastanol inhibits the absorption of cholesterol from the diet. Animal studies suggest that it also inhibits biosynthesis of cholesterol in the liver.

Stigmastanol is the product of the reduction of β-sitosterol and the hydrogenation of stigmasterol.

== See also ==
- Stigmasterol, a closely related sterol
