= 24-methylenesterol C-methyltransferase =

Class of enzymes

Identifiers
- EC no.: 2.1.1.143

Databases
- IntEnz: IntEnz view
- BRENDA: BRENDA entry
- ExPASy: NiceZyme view
- KEGG: KEGG entry
- MetaCyc: metabolic pathway
- PRIAM: profile
- PDB structures: RCSB PDB PDBe PDBsum
- Gene Ontology: AmiGO / QuickGO
Search
- PMC: articles
- PubMed: articles
- NCBI: proteins

24-methylenesterol C-methyltransferase (EC 2.1.1.143) is an enzyme that catalyzes the chemical reaction

24-Methylenelophenol
+ SAM
Citrostadienol
+ SAH

This is a methylation reaction in which the phytosterol, 24-methylenelophenol, is converted to citrostadienol. The methyl group comes from the cofactor, S-adenosyl methionine (SAM), which becomes S-adenosyl-L-homocysteine (SAH). The enzyme was characterised from Nicotiana tabacum.

This enzyme belongs to the family of transferases, specifically those transferring one-carbon group methyltransferases. The systematic name of this enzyme class is S-adenosyl-L-methionine:24-methylenelophenol C-methyltransferase. Other names in common use include SMT2, and 24-methylenelophenol C-241-methyltransferase.
