= Diacylglycerol—sterol O-acyltransferase =

diacylglycerol-sterol O-acyltransferase

Identifiers
- EC no.: 2.3.1.73
- CAS no.: 79586-23-5

Databases
- IntEnz: IntEnz view
- BRENDA: BRENDA entry
- ExPASy: NiceZyme view
- KEGG: KEGG entry
- MetaCyc: metabolic pathway
- PRIAM: profile
- PDB structures: RCSB PDB PDBe PDBsum
- Gene Ontology: AmiGO / QuickGO
Search
- PMC: articles
- PubMed: articles
- NCBI: proteins

In enzymology, a diacylglycerol-sterol O-acyltransferase (EC 2.3.1.73) is an enzyme that catalyzes the chemical reaction

1,2-diacyl-sn-glycerol + sterol $\rightleftharpoons$ monoacylglycerol + sterol ester

Thus, the two substrates of this enzyme are 1,2-diacyl-sn-glycerol and sterol, whereas its two products are monoacylglycerol and sterol ester.

This enzyme belongs to the family of transferases, specifically those acyltransferases transferring groups other than aminoacyl groups. The systematic name of this enzyme class is 1,2-diacyl-sn-glycerol:sterol O-acyltransferase. This enzyme is also called 1,2-diacyl-sn-glycerol:sterol acyl transferase. This enzyme participates in bile acid biosynthesis.
