= Vernix caseosa =

Waxy white substance found coating the skin of newborn human babies

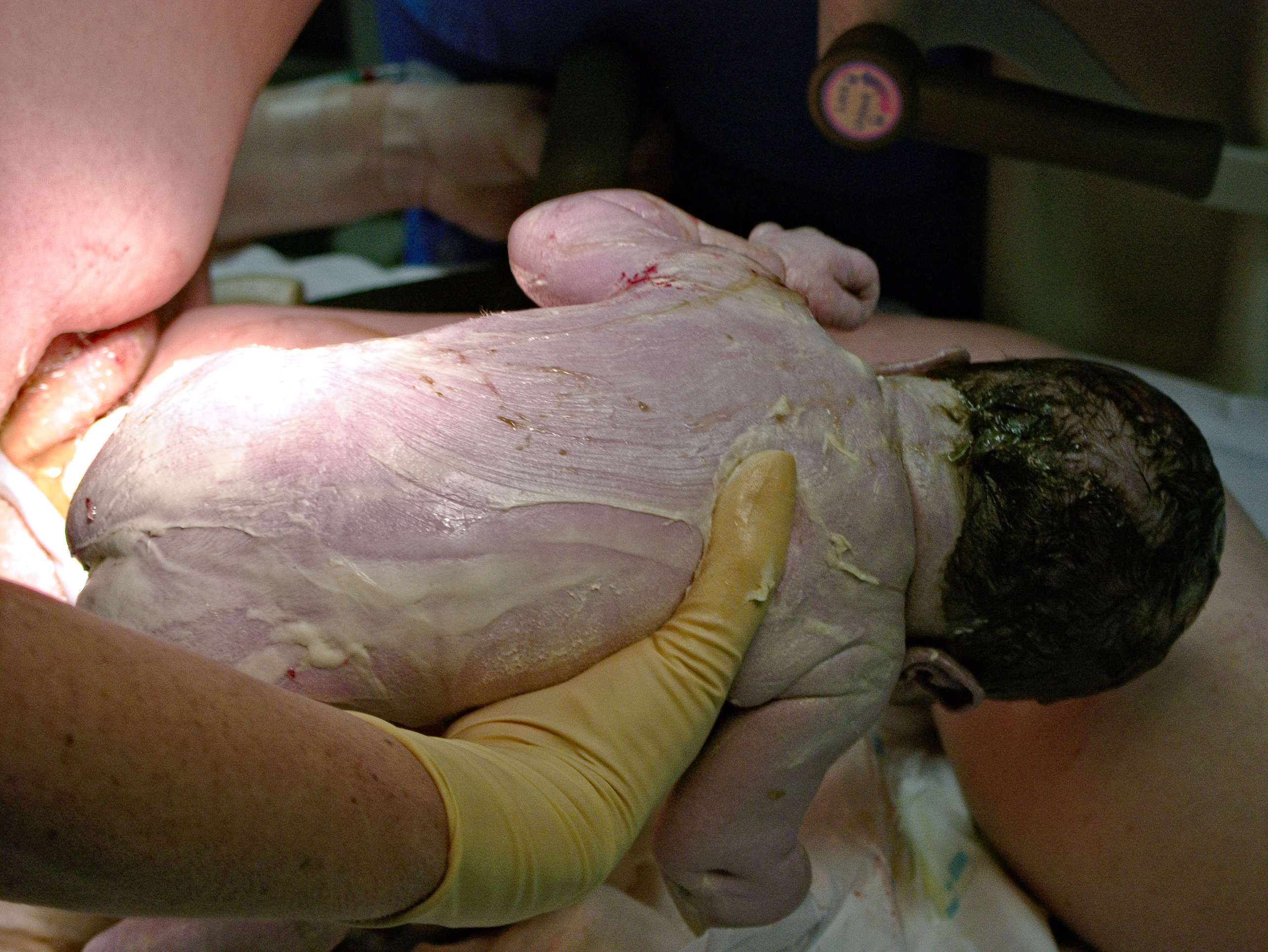
Newborn baby immediately after birth, covered in vernix

Vernix caseosa, or simply vernix, is the waxy white substance found coating the skin of newborn human babies. It is produced by dedicated cells and is thought to have some protective roles during fetal development and for a few hours after birth.

== Etymology ==
In Latin, vernix means varnish and caseosa means cheesy. The term was first published in 1846 in the Dunglison Dictionary of Medical Sciences.

== In-utero development ==
Vernix is produced during a distinct phase of the epidermal development. Around the 21st week of gestation, periderm cells are being shed and replaced with stratum corneum; these shedding mix with secretions of sebum by the sebaceous glands to form vernix, which gradually covers the body in an anteroposterior and dorsoventral pattern. Vernix, in itself, is also believed to aid in the formation of stratum corneum. By early third trimester, the process is complete.

Soon enough, part of the vernix is emulsified by increasing concentrations of pulmonary surfactants and desiccates, only to be consumed by the fetus; a corresponding increase in amniotic fluid turbidity is noticed.

== Characteristics ==
=== Composition ===
Vernix has a highly variable makeup but is primarily composed of sebum, cells that have sloughed off the fetus's skin and shed lanugo hair. Chemically, it is water (80%), lipids (10%) and proteins (10%). The lipids include ceramides, cholesterol, fatty acids, triglycerides, waxes and sterol esters, squalene, and phospholipids; multiple detailed analyses of the polar components have been done. The total fatty acid profile in vernix (either as part of lipids or as fatty acids) contains a variety of less common fatty acids, such as omega-7 polyunsaturated fatty acids or non-methylene-interrupted omega-3 fatty acids.

The protein composition is relatively understudied. Vernix of term infants has more squalene and a higher wax ester to sterol ester ratio than preterm infants.

=== Morphology ===
Vernix is composed of mobile corneocytes embedded in an amorphous lipid matrix. Precise biological mechanisms leading to its formation are poorly understood.

The cells are polygonal or ovoid in shape, malleable, and lack nuclei; typical thickness is 1-2 μm. Nuclear ghosts are frequently observed and Acid Phosphatase Activity is nonuniform. Keratin filaments build a scaffold like structure which form a water-storage area. As opposed to stratum corneum, the vernix corneocytes lack desmosomal attachment and the lipid layer is more disordered.

=== Physical properties ===
Vernix is a white viscous cream-like substance in appearance.

The water is not uniformly distributed throughout, but rather exclusively present in the sponge-like corneocytes; despite its high water content, vernix is non-polar (due to lipids) and more vapor-permeable than stratum corneum.

== Functions ==
Vernix appears in all full-term infants, with widely varying body coverage. Premature and post-mature births generally do not display any.

It is theorized (and observed) to serve several purposes:

- Waterproofing the skin while in gestation
- Lubricating the infant's skin and facilitating easy passage through the birth canal
- Preventing infections — primarily as a mechanical barrier and secondarily via the presence of lysozyme, lactoferrin, and antimicrobial components in the peptide layer
- Moisturizing the stratum corneum while in gestation (and controlling drying in the postpartum period)
- Thermoregulation in the postpartum phase (Evidence is mixed.)
- Quick healing of epidermal wounds
- Development of the gut after intra-uterine consumption

Vernix caseosa is thought to cause electrical isolation of the fetus, which could affect accurate fECG measurement of the fetal heartbeat.

== Medical uses ==
Vernix is used as a reliable site-of-record for measuring cocaine exposure in pregnant women. Using vernix for diagnosing uterine rupture and amniotic fluid embolism has been proposed.

=== Disorders ===
Granuloma and peritonitis of vernix have been observed in Caesarean sections. High volumes of vernix cause Neonatal Aspiration Syndrome.

== Other species ==
Vernix was thought to be unique to human fetal development. In 2018, vernix-like material was reportedly obtained from pups of the California sea lion. Mass spectrometry of the material showed it to be fundamentally the same as human vernix, in both BCFA (branch-chain fatty acids) and squalene content. The presence of vernix throughout the infant gastro-intestinal tract, as well as in the meconium (first excretion), in both human and sea lion neonates, argues that the function of vernix may not be as an external skin protection, as often described in the literature, but as a preparation of the newborn GI tract against water-borne bacteria. As such, vernix caseosa, not present in any terrestrial mammal, including other primates, is one of several arguments for a possible semi-aquatic past of our ancestors.

== Additional images ==
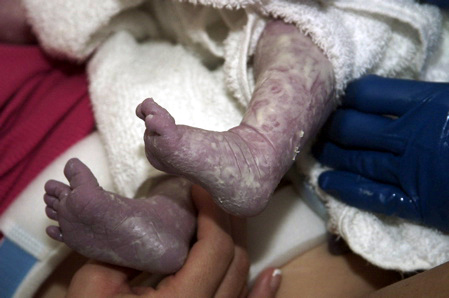
Vernix on a newborn's legs and feet.

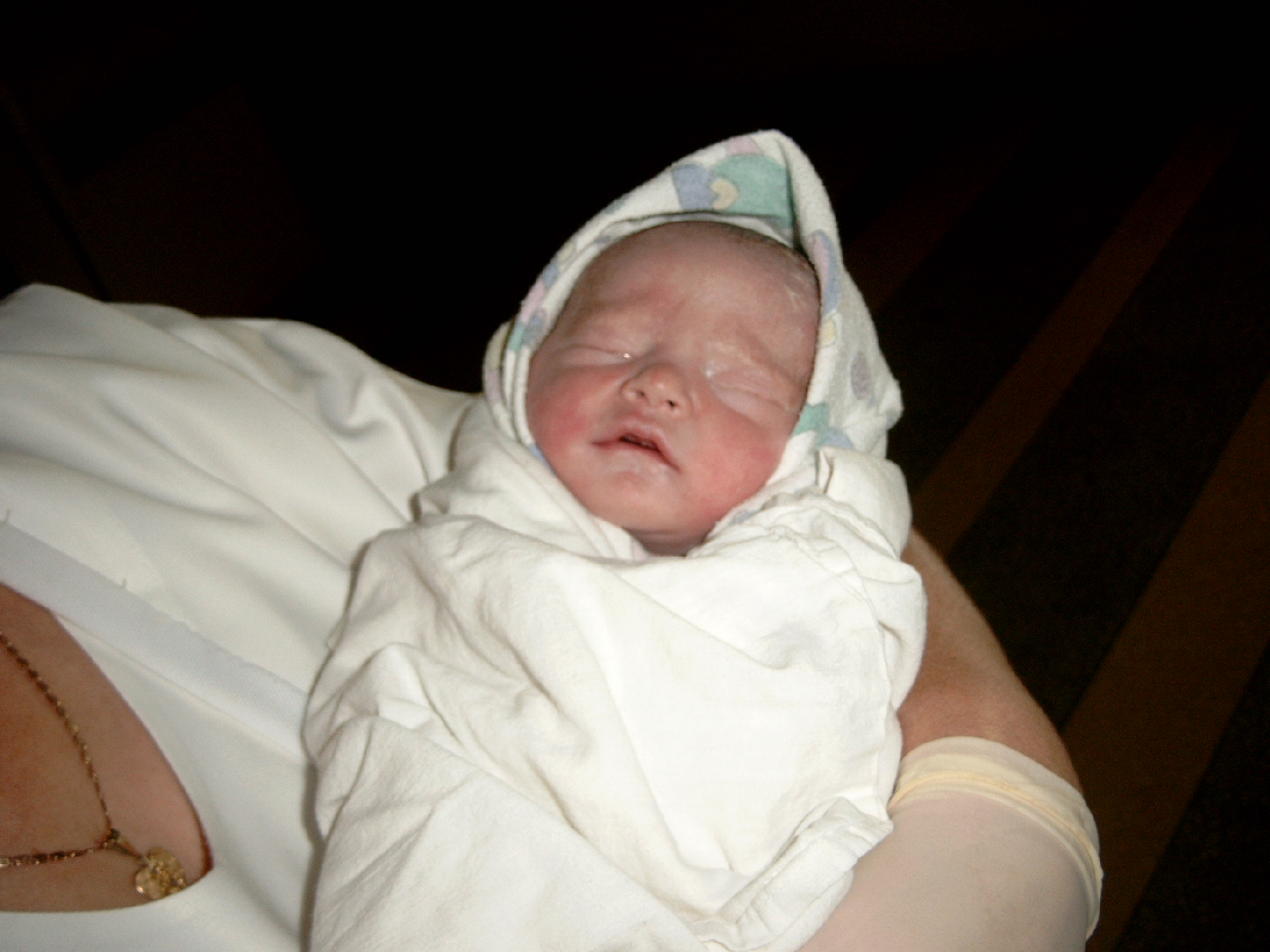
Traces of vernix on a full term newborn.

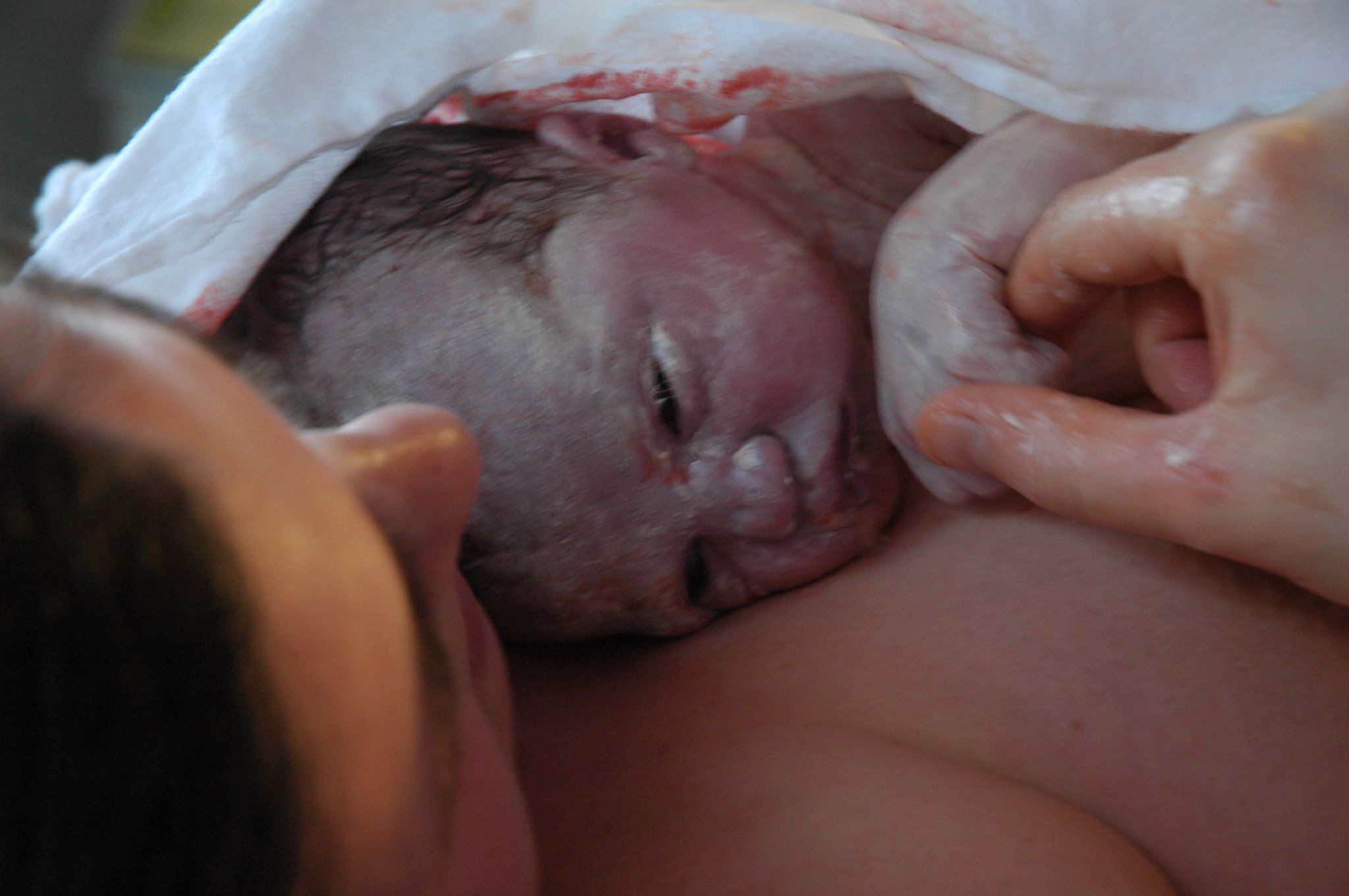
Closeup of baby's face right after birth, skin covered in vernix and some blood.
