= Cyanin =

Cyanin may refer to:

- Cyanine, a non-systematic name of a synthetic dye family belonging to the polymethine group.
- Cyanin (anthocyanin) (Cyanidin-3,5-O-diglucoside), a diglucoside of the anthocyanidin cyanidin.
