= Stigmasterol-rich plant sterols =

Soybean-derived food additive

Stigmasterol-rich plant sterols is a food additive. It is a mixture derived from soybeans that consists of the plant sterols stigmasterol, β-sitosterol, campesterol, and brassicasterol, with stigmasterol representing >85% of the mixture. Its E number is E499 and it is used as a stabiliser in ready-to-freeze alcoholic cocktails.
