= Citrostadienol =

Names
- IUPAC name (3S,4S,5S,9R,10S,13R,14R,17R)-4,10,13-trimethyl-17-[(Z,2R)-5-propan-2-ylhept-5-en-2-yl]-2,3,4,5,6,9,11,12,14,15,16,17-dodecahydro-1H-cyclopenta[a]phenanthren-3-ol
- Other names: alpha1-Sitosterol; 24-Ethylidenelophenol

Identifiers
CAS Number	474-40-8
3D model (JSmol)	Interactive image
Beilstein Reference	3222151
ChEBI	CHEBI:33203
ChEMBL	ChEMBL3184315
ChemSpider	10468895
KEGG	C11523
PubChem CID	9548595
UNII	U71X1M7968
CompTox Dashboard (EPA)	DTXSID5023584
- InChI: InChI=1S/C30H50O/c1-8-22(19(2)3)10-9-20(4)24-13-14-26-23-11-12-25-21(5)28(31)16-18-30(25,7)27(23)15-17-29(24,26)6/h8,11,19-21,24-28,31H,9-10,12-18H2,1-7H3/b22-8-/t20-,21+,24-,25+,26+,27+,28+,29-,30+/m1/s1 Key: LPZCCMIISIBREI-JXMPMKKESA-N
- SMILES: CC=C(CCC(C)C1CCC2C1(CCC3C2=CCC4C3(CCC(C4C)O)C)C)C(C)C

Properties
Chemical formula	C_{30}H_{50}O
Molar mass	426.729 g·mol^{−1}
Appearance	powder
Density	0.96 g/cm^{3}
Melting point	161.6
Solubility in water	poorly soluble
- Except where otherwise noted, data are given for materials in their standard state (at 25 °C [77 °F], 100 kPa). Infobox references

Citrostadienol is a naturally occurring phytosterol with the chemical formula C_{30}H_{50}O, obtained from citrus species. As a 4-desmethylsterol, it is a biosynthetic precursor in the plant sterol pathway and has attracted scientific interest for its potential biological activities, particularly its antimicrobial properties. The compound also belongs to the sterol class of steroids.

== Structure ==
The сitrostadienol structure is characterized by a double bond between the C-7 and C-8 positions (a Δ^{7} bond) in the sterol nucleus, classifying it as a Δ^{7}-sterol. This fact distinguishes it from more common plant sterols like β-sitosterol or stigmasterol, which are typically Δ^{5}-sterols.

== Natural occurrence ==
The compound is found primarily in the Rutaceae family, especially citrus species, and in grains like oats (genus Avena). The compound is also present in the fruits of Schizandra chinensis.

== Synthesis ==
In plants, citrostadienol is synthesized via the acetate-mevalonate pathway. It is an intermediate in the biosynthesis of other sterols, formed from epoxysqualene and further metabolized. Its accumulation varies among plant species and tissues.

== Physical properties ==
The compound forms powder. Poorly soluble in water, but soluble in chloroform, dichloromethane, ethyl acetate, DMSO, acetone, etc.

== Uses ==
Ongoing scientific investigations are exploring its potential as a natural antimicrobial for diverse uses. These include food preservation, where it could combat spoilage organisms to prolong product shelf life, and pharmaceuticals, especially in topical formulations for bacterial or fungal infections. Studies are also evaluating its effectiveness and safety to determine its suitability for inclusion in antimicrobial consumer products.
