= C28H48O =

The molecular formula C_{28}H_{48}O (molar mass: 400.68 g/mol, exact mass: 400.3705 u) may refer to:

- Campesterol
- Ergostenol
  - α-Ergostenol
  - β-Ergostenol
  - Fungisterol (γ-Ergostenol)
- Lophenol
