= Benecol =

Brand of cholesterol-lowering food products

- Product type: Cholesterol-lowering spreads Dietary supplements
- Current owner: The Raisio Group
- Country: Finland
- Introduced: 1995; 31 years ago
- Markets: 30 countries
- Ambassadors: Sonia O'Sullivan; Carol Vorderman; Lucy Kennedy; Jo Whiley; Dáithí Ó Sé
- Tagline: "Proven to lower cholesterol"
- Website: benecol.com

Benecol spread as marketed in Finland

Benecol is a brand of cholesterol-lowering food products owned by the Finnish company Raisio Group, which owns the trademark.

Raisio Group licenses the Benecol brand and sells the ingredient stanol ester to food companies around the world. The brand is licensed in more than 30 countries by local food companies such as Kaiku in Spain, Colanta in Colombia, Lotte in South Korea, Kalbe Nutritionals in Indonesia and Johnson & Johnson in the US.

== Effects on health ==
The European Commission approved the following statement regarding Benecol products: "Plant stanol esters have been shown to lower/reduce blood cholesterol. Blood cholesterol lowering may reduce the risk of coronary heart disease" but noted that "there are no studies demonstrating that plant stanol esters have an impact on population-based CHD morbidity and mortality rates".

The National Institute for Health and Clinical Excellence of England and Wales similarly found that while "[t]here is evidence that foods containing plant sterols and stanols reduce cholesterol levels", the government body concludes that "there is not enough evidence at the moment that these products prevent cardiovascular disease."

== Effects on cholesterol ==
Benecol contains plant-based cholesterols, such as plant stanols or sterols. This displaces cholesterol from micelles so less is absorbed in the small intestine. However, plant-based cholesterols get pumped out of enterocyte cells so are not absorbed effectively.

There is substantial evidence to support the cholesterol-lowering effect of phytosterol- and phytostanol-containing products. After rigorous scientific assessment by the European Food Safety Authority (EFSA), four health claims have been approved for use in the European Union and the United Kingdom, allowing products to emphasise the proven health benefit. The European Commission has authorised that an LDL-cholesterol lowering effect of 7–10% can be achieved in 2–3 weeks by a daily intake of plant stanol esters equivalent to 1.5–2.4 g of plant stanols in an appropriate food.

The United States Food and Drug Administration (FDA) recognises the role of plant stanols in lowering blood total and LDL cholesterol, and has authorised a “Health Claim Meeting Significant Scientific Agreement (SSA)” for use on certain foods to which plant stanols have been added. The following is the FDA model health claim, to which certain designated optional modifications may be made: “Foods containing at least 0.5g per serving of plant stanols eaten with meals or snacks for a daily total intake of 2g as part of a diet low in saturated fat and cholesterol, may reduce the risk of heart disease. A serving of Benecol buttery spread supplies 1 g of plant stanols."

Consuming more than 3g of plant stanol per day is not recommended and Benecol foods may not be appropriate for pregnant or breast feeding women, and children under five years old.

Two reviews confirm that plant stanol and sterol esters lower cholesterol levels.

Benecol foods have been found as a way to reduce cholesterol and they may help lower cholesterol in people taking statins. However, it is important that those already taking cholesterol lowering medication consult with their GP (Primary Care Physician) before starting on dietary cholesterol programmes.

== About the products ==
The first Benecol product was a spread that was brought to market in Finland in 1995. Since then, the product line has expanded to fat spreads, yogurts, yogurt drinks, cream cheese style spreads, milk and soy drinks, bread and oatmeal. The availability of different products varies in different countries.

== See also ==
- Becel
