= Brassicasterol =

- Brassicasterol

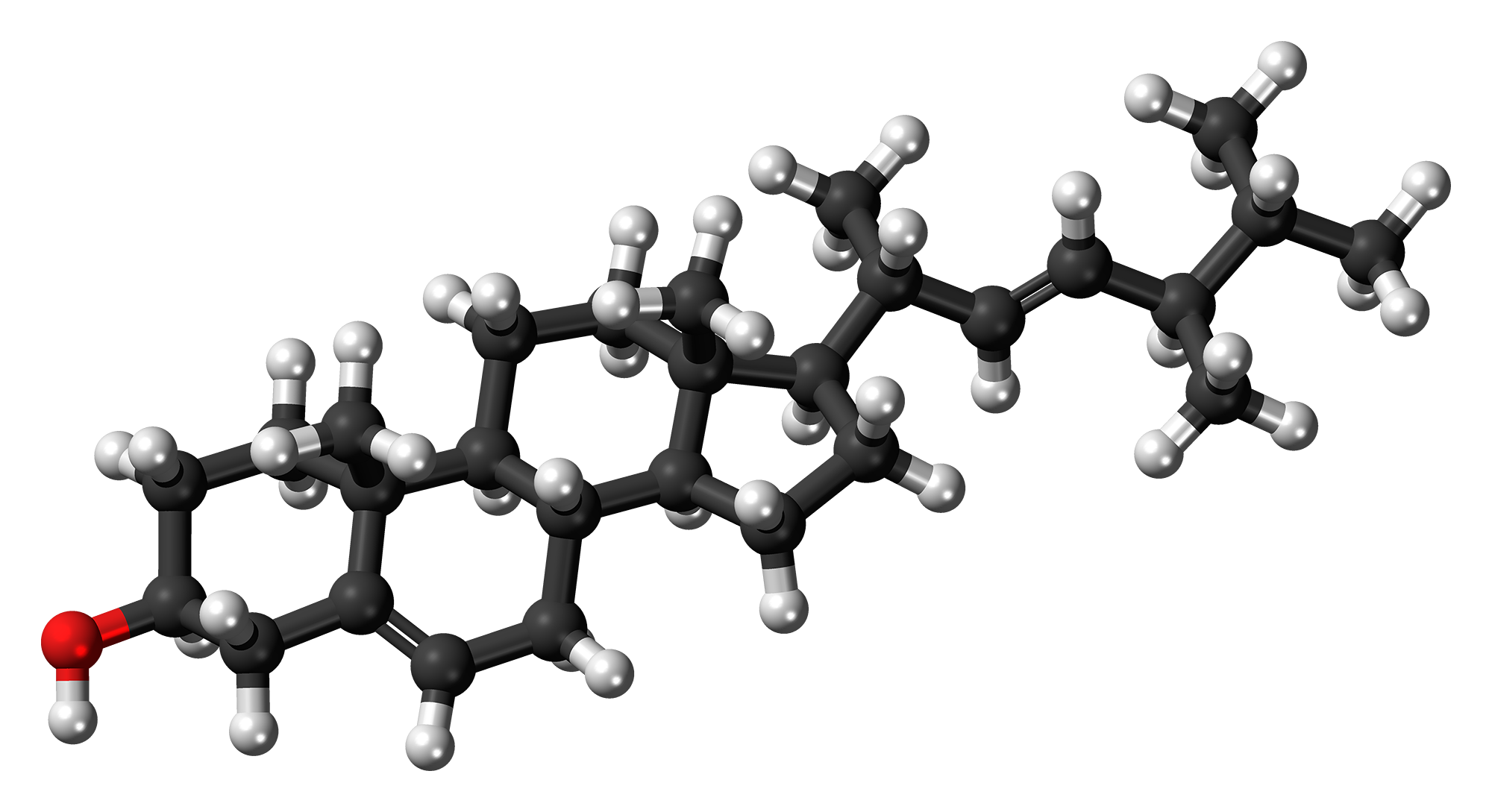

Names
- IUPAC name Ergosta-5,22-dien-3β-ol
- Systematic IUPAC name (1R,3aS,3bS,7S,9aR,9bS,11aR)-1-[(2R,3E,4R)-5,6-Dimethylhept-3-en-2-yl]-9a,11a-dimethyl-2,3,3a,3b,4,6,7,8,9,9a,9b,10,11,11a-tetradecahydro-1H-cyclopenta[a]phenanthren-7-ol
- Other names brassicasterol (3β,22E)-ergosta-5,22-dien-3-ol; 24β-methylcholesta-5,22-dien-3 beta-ol 24-methyl cholest-5,22-dien-3β-ol

Identifiers
CAS Number	474-67-9
3D model (JSmol)	Interactive image
ChEBI	CHEBI:3168
ChemSpider	4444704
ECHA InfoCard	100.006.807
PubChem CID	6432458
UNII	2B0KG2XFOF
CompTox Dashboard (EPA)	DTXSID80197124
- InChI: InChI=1S/C28H46O/c1-18(2)19(3)7-8-20(4)24-11-12-25-23-10-9-21-17-22(29)13-15-27(21,5)26(23)14-16-28(24,25)6/h7-9,18-20,22-26,29H,10-17H2,1-6H3/b8-7+/t19-,20+,22-,23-,24+,25-,26-,27-,28+/m0/s1 Key: OILXMJHPFNGGTO-ZAUYPBDWSA-N; InChI=1/C28H46O/c1-18(2)19(3)7-8-20(4)24-11-12-25-23-10-9-21-17-22(29)13-15-27(21,5)26(23)14-16-28(24,25)6/h7-9,18-20,22-26,29H,10-17H2,1-6H3/b8-7+/t19-,20+,22-,23-,24+,25-,26-,27-,28+/m0/s1 Key: OILXMJHPFNGGTO-ZAUYPBDWBS
- SMILES: O[C@@H]4C/C3=C/C[C@@H]1[C@H](CC[C@@]2([C@H](CC[C@@H]12)[C@@H](/C=C/[C@H](C)C(C)C)C)C)[C@@]3(C)CC4

Properties
Chemical formula	C_{28}H_{46}O
Molar mass	398.675 g·mol^{−1}
Appearance	White solid
Melting point	150 to 151 °C (302 to 304 °F; 423 to 424 K)

Hazards
Flash point	Non-flammable

Related compounds
Related Sterols	cholesterol β-sitosterol campesterol stigmasterol
- Except where otherwise noted, data are given for materials in their standard state (at 25 °C [77 °F], 100 kPa). verify (what is ?) Infobox references

Brassicasterol (24-methyl cholest-5,22-dien-3β-ol) is a 28-carbon sterol synthesised by several unicellular algae (phytoplankton) and some terrestrial plants, like rape. This compound has frequently been used as a biomarker for the presence of (marine) algal matter in the environment, and is one of the ingredients in stigmasterol-rich plant sterols (Number E499 in the European numbering system).

There is some evidence to suggest that it may also be a relevant additional biomarker in Alzheimer's disease. More specifically, AD patients have lower levels of this sterol in their cerebrospinal fluid.

== Chemical properties ==
=== Solubility ===
Brassicasterol has a low water solubility and, as a consequence, a high octanol-water partition coefficient. This means that, in most environmental systems, brassicasterol will be associated with the solid phase.

=== Degradation ===
In anaerobic sediments and soils, brassicasterol is stable for many hundreds of years, enabling it to be used as an indicator of past algal production (see below).

== Formation and occurrences ==
It can be found in Mirabilis jalapa.

=== Algal sources ===
Brassicasterol is formed in plants from the isoprenoid squalene through campesterol as an intermediate. A list of the algae in which brassicasterol has been identified is shown below together with approximate composition.

Sterol content of selected dinoflagellates (as percentage). Data from Volkman, 1986
Species	A	B	C	D	E	F	G	H	others
Gonyaulax spp	100	0	0	0	0	0	0	0	0
Peridinium foliaceum	100	0	0	0	0	0	0	0	0
Peridinium foliaceum	80	20	0	0	0	0	0	0	0
Gonyaulax diegensis	39	0	0	0	0	0	0	29	32
Pyrocystis lunula	76	6	0	2	1	0	0	0	15
Gonyaulax polygramma	36	1	0	9	7	0	0	0	47
Gymnodinium wilczeki	26	39	0	35	1	0	0	0	0
Glenodinium hallii	8	50	0	0	0	42	0	0	0
Noctiluca milaris	0	1	1	5	73	0	6	0	14
Gymnodinium simplex	0	0	0	0	53	0	0	0	47
Prorocentrum cordatum	7	0	0	0	5	0	63	0	25

A = cholesterol
B = campesterol
C = sitosterol
D = 22-dehydrocholesterol ((22E)-cholesta-5,22-dien-3β-ol)
E = brassicasterol
F = stigmasterol
G = 24-methylene cholesterol
H = fucosterol

== Use as a tracer for marine algae ==
The principal source of brassicasterol in the environment is from marine algae. Its relatively high concentration and stability allows it to be used in the assessment of the origin of organic matter in samples, especially sediments.
