= C27H31O16 =

The molecular formula C_{27}H_{31}O_{16}+ (molar mass: 611.52 g/mol, exact mass: 611.1612 u) may refer to:

- Cyanidin-3,5-O-diglucoside (also known as cyanin)
- Tulipanin
