= Raisio Group =

Finnish food company

Raisio plc
- Native name: Raisio Oyj
- Type: Julkinen osakeyhtiö
- Traded as: Nasdaq Helsinki: RAIKV, RAIVV
- Industry: Food
- Founded: 1939
- Headquarters: Raisio, Finland
- Revenue: €224.2 million (2025)
- Number of employees: 350 (2025)
- Website: raisio.com

Raisio Oyj, known internationally as Raisio Group, is a Finnish food production company.

Raisio Group's international brands are Benecol and Elovena.

Benecol foods were launched in Finland in 1995 as part of a public health initiative to lower the nation's cholesterol. Two decades later Benecol product range has grown to include spreads, yogurts and yogurt drinks.

In 2024, the Group's net sales totalled EUR 226.8 million and comparable EBIT was EUR 23.4 million. Raisio's production plants are located in Finland and the company has employees in seven countries. The Group's key offices are in Finland, the UK, Ireland, Poland and Ukraine. The Group's headquarters is in Raisio, Western Finland. Raisio exports to more than 40 markets around the world. Raisio employs about 350 people.

In 2004, the company divested its paper chemical division, Raisio Chemicals, to Ciba Specialty Chemicals. In 2009, Raisio sold its margarine business to Bunge Limited. Raisio Group acquired the British food company Glisten in 2010. The next year, Raisio acquired Big Bear. In November 2014 Raisio acquired the Benecol business from the affiliates of Johnson & Johnson in the UK, Ireland and Belgium and amended the agreement on the Northern American markets of Benecol. In 2016 Raisio divested its snack bar business in the UK.

The main target for 2007 was to improve profitability through streamlining, focusing and enhancing operations. Hereby Raisio divested its food potato and diagnostics businesses and carried through several minor structural changes. Raisio and its partner McNeil signed an agreement that returned Benecol rights to Raisio. The company divested its confectionery business in the end of 2017 and the cattle feed business in 2018. The strategy 2022–2025 has a clear focus on healthy, responsibly produced food. In 2021, Raisio acquired the Finnish company Verso Food Oy and published a new strategy for 2022–2025. The strategy is based on three focus areas: Benecol products and plant stanol ester solutions, oat-based consumer products and oats as an industrial raw material, and plant-based food.

In March 2025, Raisio published its strategy for 2025–2027. The strategy is based on three growth areas: Breakfast and snacking, Heart health, and New Business to Raisio. Raisio focuses on utilising its strong balance sheet more efficiently to accelerate growth, which entails opportunities to implement targeted acquisitions and investments in research activities. In March 2025, Raisio sold its plant protein business. Even though Raisio decided to divest this business, promoting the food transition with plant-based food and innovating new things will continue to be key parts of Raisio’s strategy and operations.
