= 24-Methylenelophenol =

Chemical compound

Names
- IUPAC name 4α-Methyl-5α-campesta-7,24(24^{1})-dien-3β-ol
- Systematic IUPAC name (1R,3aR,5aS,6S,7S,9aS,9bR,11aR)-6,9a,11a-Trimethyl-1-[(2R)-5-methyl-4-methylideneheptan-2-yl]-2,3,3a,5,5a,6,7,8,9,9a,9b,10,11,11a-tetradecahydro-1H-cyclopenta[a]phenanthren-7-ol

Identifiers
CAS Number	1176-52-9
3D model (JSmol)	Interactive image
Beilstein Reference	3655840
ChEBI	CHEBI:29107
ChemSpider	4446733
KEGG	C11522
PubChem CID	5283640
UNII	49V26P6XPX
CompTox Dashboard (EPA)	DTXSID701318205
- InChI: InChI=1S/C29H48O/c1-18(2)19(3)8-9-20(4)23-12-13-25-22-10-11-24-21(5)27(30)15-17-29(24,7)26(22)14-16-28(23,25)6/h10,18,20-21,23-27,30H,3,8-9,11-17H2,1-2,4-7H3/t20-,21+,23-,24+,25+,26+,27+,28-,29+/m1/s1 Key: RSMKYRDCCSNYFM-AAGDOFLISA-N
- SMILES: C[C@@H]1[C@H](CC[C@]2([C@H]1CC=C3[C@@H]2CC[C@]4([C@H]3CC[C@@H]4[C@H](C)CCC(=C)C(C)C)C)C)O

Properties
Chemical formula	C_{29}H_{48}O
Molar mass	412.702 g·mol^{−1}
- Except where otherwise noted, data are given for materials in their standard state (at 25 °C [77 °F], 100 kPa). Infobox references

24-Methylenelophenol, or gramisterol, also called 4α-methyl-5α-ergosta-7,24(28)-dien-3β-ol is a metabolic intermediate of sterol biosynthesis of plants and fungis, can be converted from 4α-methylfecosterol by enzyme HYD1 and converted to (Z)-24-ethylidenelophenol by 24-methylenesterol C-methyltransferase.
