= Norcycloartenol =

Names
- Other names 4α,14α-dimethyl-9β,19-cyclo-5α-cholest-24-en-3β-ol

Identifiers
CAS Number	60485-38-3
3D model (JSmol)	Interactive image
ChemSpider	58837777
PubChem CID	102515312
- InChI: InChI=1S/C29H48O/c1-19(2)8-7-9-20(3)22-12-14-27(6)25-11-10-23-21(4)24(30)13-15-28(23)18-29(25,28)17-16-26(22,27)5/h8,20-25,30H,7,9-18H2,1-6H3/t20-,21+,22-,23+,24+,25+,26-,27+,28?,29?/m1/s1 Key: XZEUYTKSAYNYPK-YETBRXCGSA-N
- SMILES: C[C@H]1[C@@H]2CC[C@H]3[C@@]4(CC[C@@H]([C@]4(CCC35C2(C5)CC[C@@H]1O)C)[C@H](C)CCC=C(C)C)C

Properties
Chemical formula	C_{29}H_{48}O
Molar mass	412.702 g·mol^{−1}
- Except where otherwise noted, data are given for materials in their standard state (at 25 °C [77 °F], 100 kPa). Infobox references

29- or 31-Norcycloartenol (Note: zoology and botany are different in numbering of steroids side chain, 24^{1} to 28, 24^{2} to 29), also called 4α,14α-dimethyl-9β,19-cyclo-5α-cholest-24-en-3β-ol, is a Metabolic intermediate of plant sterol biosynthesis. In the pathway, it is transformed from demethylation of cycloartenol, then 9,19-cyclopropyl-ring opening reaction occurs to 29-Norlanosterol.
