= C28H44O =

The molecular formula C_{28}H_{44}O (molar mass: 396.65 g/mol, exact mass: 396.3392 u) may refer to:

- 5-Dehydroepisterol
- Ergocalciferol
- Ergosterol
- Lichesterol
- Lumisterol
