= Sterol 24-C-methyltransferase =

Identifiers
- EC no.: 2.1.1.41
- CAS no.: 37257-07-1

Databases
- IntEnz: IntEnz view
- BRENDA: BRENDA entry
- ExPASy: NiceZyme view
- KEGG: KEGG entry
- MetaCyc: metabolic pathway
- PRIAM: profile
- PDB structures: RCSB PDB PDBe PDBsum
- Gene Ontology: AmiGO / QuickGO
Search
- PMC: articles
- PubMed: articles
- NCBI: proteins

Sterol 24-C-methyltransferase (EC 2.1.1.41) is an enzyme that catalyzes the chemical reaction

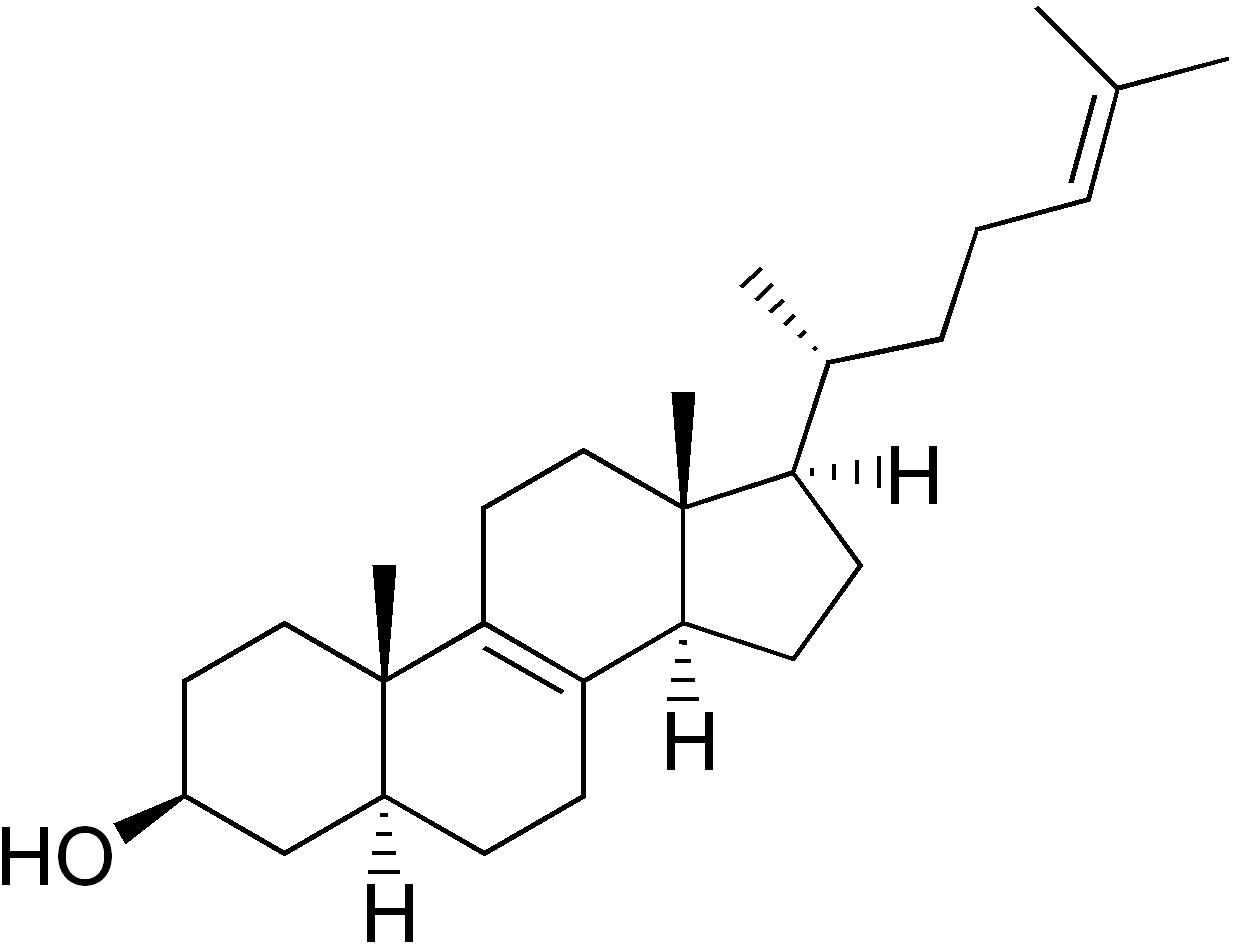
zymosterol
+ SAM
fecosterol
+ SAH

This is a methylation reaction in which zymosterol is converted to fecosterol. The methyl group comes from the cofactor, S-adenosyl methionine (SAM), which loses its methyl group and becomes S-adenosyl-L-homocysteine (SAH).

This enzyme belongs to the family of transferases, specifically those transferring one-carbon group methyltransferases. The systematic name of this enzyme class is S-adenosyl-L-methionine:zymosterol 24-C-methyltransferase. Other names in common use include Delta24-methyltransferase, Delta24-sterol methyltransferase, zymosterol-24-methyltransferase, S-adenosyl-4-methionine:sterol Delta24-methyltransferase, SMT1, 24-sterol C-methyltransferase, S-adenosyl-L-methionine:Delta24(23)-sterol methyltransferase, and phytosterol methyltransferase. Zymosterol is the preferred substrate for the enzyme but it accepts other sterols with a double bond in the same position in the sidechain, such as desmosterol. It uses glutathione as a cofactor.
