= 29-Norlanosterol =

Names
- IUPAC name 29-Norlanosta-8,24-dien-3α-ol
- Systematic IUPAC name (1R,3aR,5aS,6S,7S,9aS,11aR)-3a,6,9a,11a-Tetramethyl-1-[(2R)-6-methylhept-5-en-2-yl]-2,3,3a,4,5,5a,6,7,8,9,9a,10,11,11a-tetradecahydro-1H-cyclopenta[a]phenanthren-7-ol
- Other names 4α,14α-Dimethyl-5α-cholesta-8,24-dien-3β-ol

Identifiers
3D model (JSmol)	Interactive image
ChEMBL	ChEMBL5094136
ChemSpider	58829794
PubChem CID	15101557
- InChI: InChI=1S/C29H48O/c1-19(2)9-8-10-20(3)22-13-17-29(7)25-12-11-23-21(4)26(30)15-16-27(23,5)24(25)14-18-28(22,29)6/h9,20-23,26,30H,8,10-18H2,1-7H3/t20-,21+,22-,23+,26+,27+,28-,29+/m1/s1 Key: KLZWTHGLLDRKHD-PMIIOQGLSA-N
- SMILES: C[C@H]1[C@@H]2CCC3=C([C@]2(CC[C@@H]1O)C)CC[C@]4([C@]3(CC[C@@H]4[C@H](C)CCC=C(C)C)C)C

Properties
Chemical formula	C_{29}H_{48}O
Molar mass	412.702 g·mol^{−1}
- Except where otherwise noted, data are given for materials in their standard state (at 25 °C [77 °F], 100 kPa). Infobox references

29-Norlanosterol, or 4-demethyllanosterol, also called 4α,14α-dimethylzymosterol, is a Metabolic intermediate of plant sterol biosynthesis. In the pathway, it is transformed from ring-opening reactions of norcycloartenol and then demethylation by CYP51 into 4α-methyl-5α-cholesta-8,14,24-trien-3β-ol.
