= Ciba Specialty Chemicals =

Swiss chemical company

- Company type: Public limited company
- Industry: Chemicals
- Predecessors: Ciba-Geigy, Sandoz
- Founded: 1997 as spin out of Novartis
- Defunct: 15 September 2008
- Fate: Acquired by BASF
- Successor: BASF Schweiz AG, Zurich
- Headquarters: Basel, Switzerland
- Products: plastics, chemicals
- Owner: BASF
- Parent: BASF Performance Products Limited

Ciba was a chemical company based in and near Basel, Switzerland. "Ciba" stood for "Chemische Industrie Basel" (Chemical Industries Basel) and was formed when the non-pharmaceuticals elements of Novartis were spun out in 1997, following the merger in the previous year of Ciba-Geigy and Sandoz that created Novartis.

In 2008, Ciba was acquired by the German chemical company BASF and, in April 2009, integrated into the BASF group. Ciba AG initially continued to trade under the old name, but was renamed to BASF Schweiz AG in March 2010.

The BASF subsidiary makes products in the following areas: Agriculture, Automotive, Construction & Pipes, Electronic materials, Extractive & Process Technologies, Home & Fabric Care, Inks & Graphics, Lubricants, Monomers & Water Soluble Polymers, Packaging, Paints and Coatings, Paper, Personal Care, Photo & Digital Imaging, Plastics & Rubber, Textiles & Fibers, Water treatment.

== History ==
The company first came to life under the name "Gesellschaft fur Chemische Industrie", and eventually settled on an acronym of Chemische Industrie Basel sometime after 1920.

Part of the merger agreement of 1997, between Ciba Geigy and Sandoz, was that the former's industrial chemicals business would be spun off as a separate business, leading to the formation of Ciba Specialty Chemicals plc.

In 2004, Ciba bought paper chemical manufacturer Raisio Chemicals from Raisio Group. In 2006, Ciba divested its textile dyes and chemical auxiliaries business in a sale to Huntsman Corporation.

In 2007, the company announced the intention to adopt the name Ciba Inc.

Ciba's board of directors agreed to a €3.4 billion takeover offer from BASF, the world's largest chemicals company, on 15 September 2008.

In 2009, the parent company changed the name to BASF Performance Products Limited – BASF group.
