= 4α-Methylfecosterol =

Chemical compound

Names
- IUPAC name 4α-Methyl-5α-campestane-8,24(24^{1})-dien-3β-ol
- Systematic IUPAC name (1R,3aR,5aS,6S,7S,9aS,11aR)-6,9a,11a-Trimethyl-1-[(2R)-6-methyl-5-methylideneheptan-2-yl]-2,3,3a,4,5,5a,6,7,8,9,9a,10,11,11a-tetradecahydro-1H-cyclopenta[a]phenanthren-7-ol

Identifiers
CAS Number	17757-07-2
3D model (JSmol)	Interactive image
ChEBI	CHEBI:80094
ChemSpider	167937
KEGG	C15776
PubChem CID	193524
UNII	PKH3GWV3BE
CompTox Dashboard (EPA)	DTXSID10938961
- InChI: InChI=1S/C29H48O/c1-18(2)19(3)8-9-20(4)23-12-13-25-22-10-11-24-21(5)27(30)15-17-29(24,7)26(22)14-16-28(23,25)6/h18,20-21,23-25,27,30H,3,8-17H2,1-2,4-7H3/t20-,21+,23-,24+,25+,27+,28-,29+/m1/s1 Key: QLDNWJOJCDIMKK-XLFBYWHPSA-N; InChI=1S/C29H48O/c1-18(2)19(3)8-9-20(4)23-12-13-25-22-10-11-24-21(5)27(30)15-17-29(24,7)26(22)14-16-28(23,25)6/h18,20-21,23-25,27,30H,3,8-17H2,1-2,4-7H3/t20-,21+,23-,24+,25+,27+,28-,29+/m1/s1 Key: QLDNWJOJCDIMKK-XLFBYWHPSA-N
- SMILES: C[C@H]1[C@@H]2CCC3=C([C@]2(CC[C@@H]1O)C)CC[C@]4([C@H]3CC[C@@H]4[C@H](C)CCC(=C)C(C)C)C

Properties
Chemical formula	C_{29}H_{48}O
Molar mass	412.702 g·mol^{−1}
- Except where otherwise noted, data are given for materials in their standard state (at 25 °C [77 °F], 100 kPa). Infobox references

4α-Methylfecosterol is a metabolic intermediate of sterols made by certain fungis, can be converted to 24-Methylenelophenol by enzyme HYD1, or undergo 4-demethylation to fecosterol.
