= Lichesterol =

Sterol made by some fungi

Names
- IUPAC name (22E)-Ergosta-5,8,22-trien-3β-ol
- Systematic IUPAC name (1R,3aR,7S,9aS,11aR)-1-[(2R,3E,5R)-5,6-Dimethylhept-3-en-2-yl]-9a,11a-dimethyl-2,3,3a,4,6,7,8,9,9a,10,11,11a-dodecahydro-1H-cyclopenta[a]phenanthren-7-ol

Identifiers
CAS Number	50657-31-3
3D model (JSmol)	Interactive image
ChEBI	CHEBI:6453
ChemSpider	4444706
KEGG	C08823
PubChem CID	5281329
CompTox Dashboard (EPA)	DTXSID101045666
- InChI: InChI=1S/C28H44O/c1-18(2)19(3)7-8-20(4)24-11-12-25-23-10-9-21-17-22(29)13-15-27(21,5)26(23)14-16-28(24,25)6/h7-9,18-20,22,24-25,29H,10-17H2,1-6H3/b8-7+/t19-,20+,22-,24+,25-,27-,28+/m0/s1 Key: VILFZDAFELACSG-CMNOFMQQSA-N; InChI=1/C28H44O/c1-18(2)19(3)7-8-20(4)24-11-12-25-23-10-9-21-17-22(29)13-15-27(21,5)26(23)14-16-28(24,25)6/h7-9,18-20,22,24-25,29H,10-17H2,1-6H3/b8-7+/t19-,20+,22-,24+,25-,27-,28+/m0/s1 Key: VILFZDAFELACSG-CMNOFMQQBH
- SMILES: C[C@H](/C=C/[C@H](C)C(C)C)[C@H]1CC[C@@H]2[C@@]1(CCC3=C2CC=C4[C@@]3(CC[C@@H](C4)O)C)C

Properties
Chemical formula	C_{28}H_{44}O
Molar mass	396.648
- Except where otherwise noted, data are given for materials in their standard state (at 25 °C [77 °F], 100 kPa). Infobox references

Lichesterol is a sterol made by certain fungi and lichens. It is found as a major component in several common lichen species such as the elegant sunburst lichen and beard lichens, and also occurs in small amounts in certain disease-causing fungi. The compound has successfully created in the laboratory starting from a related sterol compound.

== Occurrence ==
Lichesterol is one of the major sterol constituents of several common lichen species, including the "elegant sunburst lichen" (Rusavskia elegans), Cetraria delisei, and the beard lichen species Usnea hirta. Other species known to harbour the sterol include Evernia mesomorpha, Lecanora stenotropa, Nephroma helveticum, Parmelia omphalodes, Umbilicaria decussata, and Usnea antarctica.

Lichesterol is also present in small proportions (2% of total sterols) of wild-type strains of the fungus Malassezia pachydermatis. The sterol was found to be present in one of the surviving classes of a wild-type Candida albicans fungus that survived experimental treatment with the mutagen methylnitronitrosoguanidine. Lichesterol has been identified in cultures of the fungus Mucor circinelloides when treated with stress-inducing compounds such as cyclodextrins and methyl jasmonate, along with other sterols including neoergosterol and ergone.

== Synthesis ==
The laboratory synthesis of lichesterol starts with ergosteryl acetate, a commercially available sterol compound with two double bonds (called a 5,7-diene). Heating this acetate under reflux with diethyl azodicarboxylate in dry benzene triggers a specific type of chemical reaction (an ene reaction); the reagent attaches to the double bond system to give two related products with substituents at the 7α position. The major product, 7α-[N,N′-bis(ethoxycarbonyl)hydrazino]-ergosta-5,8(9),22-trien-3β-yl acetate, crystallises directly from hexane, whereas a minor Δ^{5},Δ^{8(14)} isomer is isolated only after preparative thin-layer chromatography. These nitrogen-containing products are valuable because the new carbon–nitrogen bond can later be cleanly replaced with hydrogen while preserving the unusual double bond pattern (Δ^{5},Δ^{8(9)} framework) that gives lichesterol its distinctive structure.

Treatment of the main product with lithium metal in liquid ethylamine at –20 °C cleanly breaks the hydrazide bond, delivering ergosta-5,8(9),22-trien-3β-ol in 60% isolated yield. Spectroscopic comparison—after acetylation—with natural lichesterol confirmed that the synthetic product is identical, thereby confirming the 24R stereochemistry and proving, for the first time, that it is feasible to synthesise this type of sterol (with Δ^{5},Δ^{8} double bonds) artificially in the laboratory.
