= Campestanol =

Names
- IUPAC name 5α-Campestan-3β-ol
- Systematic IUPAC name (1R,3aS,3bR,5aS,7S,9aS,9bS,11aR)-1-[(2R,5R)-5,6-Dimethylheptan-2-yl]-9a,11a-dimethylhexadecahydro-1H-cyclopenta[a]phenanthren-7-ol
- Other names Campestan-3

Identifiers
CAS Number	474-60-2
3D model (JSmol)	Interactive image
ChemSpider	106639
PubChem CID	119394
UNII	5J08LF99N1
CompTox Dashboard (EPA)	DTXSID3040988
- InChI: InChI=1S/C28H50O/c1-18(2)19(3)7-8-20(4)24-11-12-25-23-10-9-21-17-22(29)13-15-27(21,5)26(23)14-16-28(24,25)6/h18-26,29H,7-17H2,1-6H3/t19-,20-,21+,22+,23+,24-,25+,26+,27+,28-/m1/s1 Key: ARYTXMNEANMLMU-ATEDBJNTSA-N; InChI=1/C28H50O/c1-18(2)19(3)7-8-20(4)24-11-12-25-23-10-9-21-17-22(29)13-15-27(21,5)26(23)14-16-28(24,25)6/h18-26,29H,7-17H2,1-6H3/t19-,20-,21+,22+,23+,24-,25+,26+,27+,28-/m1/s1 Key: ARYTXMNEANMLMU-ATEDBJNTBU
- SMILES: C[C@H](CC[C@@H](C)C(C)C)[C@H]1CC[C@@H]2[C@@]1(CC[C@H]3[C@H]2CC[C@@H]4[C@@]3(CC[C@@H](C4)O)C)C

Properties
Chemical formula	C_{28}H_{50}O
Molar mass	402.707 g·mol^{−1}
- Except where otherwise noted, data are given for materials in their standard state (at 25 °C [77 °F], 100 kPa). Infobox references

Campestanol is a natural phytosterol.
