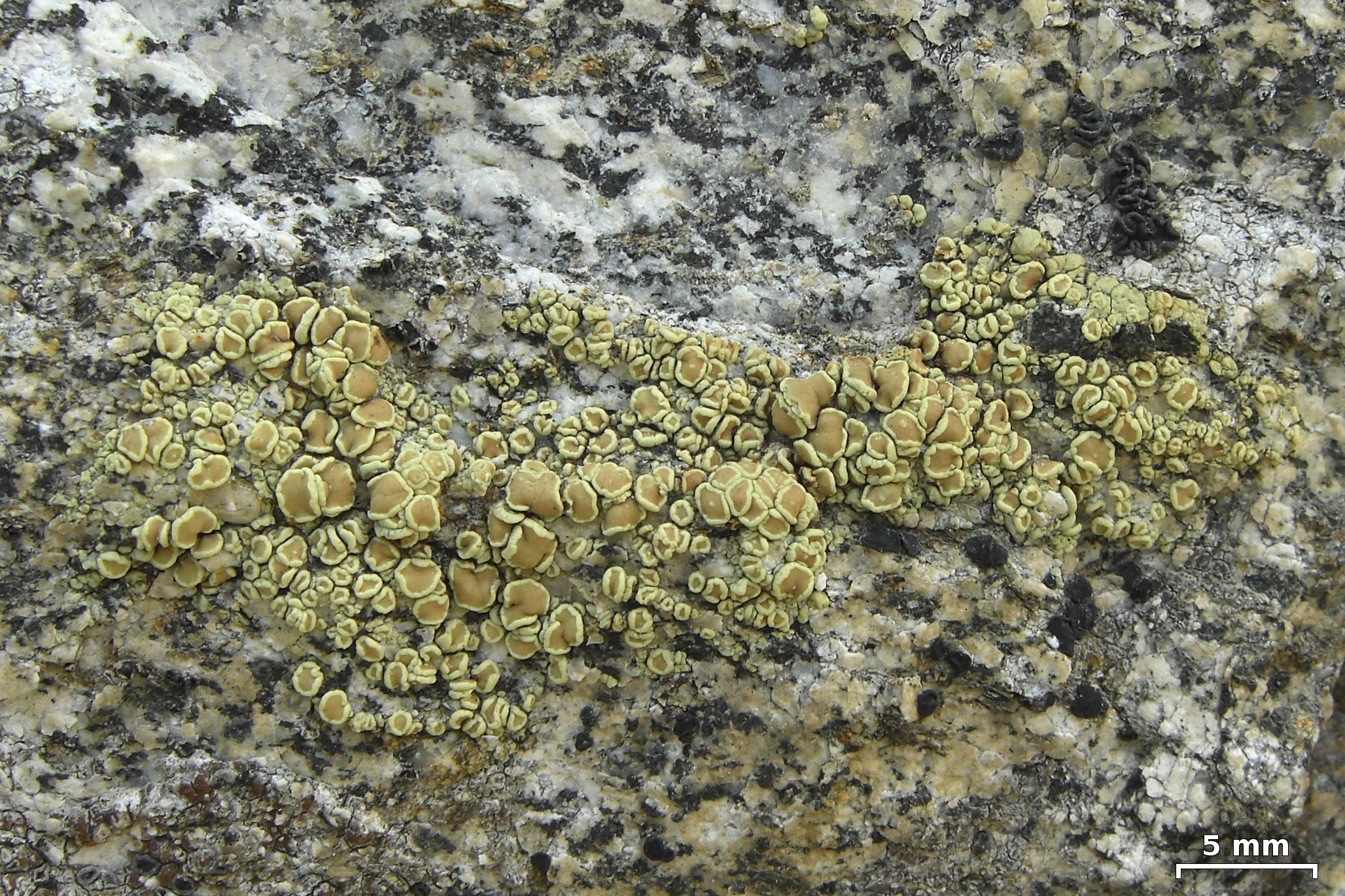

Conservation status
- Secure (NatureServe)

Scientific classification
- Kingdom: Fungi
- Division: Ascomycota
- Class: Lecanoromycetes
- Order: Lecanorales
- Family: Lecanoraceae
- Genus: Lecanora
- Species: L. stenotropa

Binomial name
- Lecanora stenotropa Nyl. (1872)

Synonyms
- Lecanora polytropa var. stenotropa (Nyl.) A.L.Sm. (1918); Lecidora stenotropa (Nyl.) Motyka (1996)

= Lecanora stenotropa =

Species of lichen

Lecanora stenotropa is a widely distributed species of saxicolous (rock-dwelling) crustose lichen in the family Lecanoraceae. It was described as new to science in 1872 by the Finnish lichenologist William Nylander.

== Description ==
Lecanora stenotropa has a thallus (the main body of the lichen) composed of scattered to partially merging rounded granules. These granules occasionally form a more or less continuous areolate crust (a surface divided into small, island-like areas). The thallus typically appears brown-green to green-grey in colouration. The lichen may have a black prothallus (a thin, spreading growth at the edge of the thallus) or none at all.

The reproductive structures, called apothecia, typically measure 0.4–0.8 mm in diameter, though specimens with larger apothecia (0.5–1.8 mm) have been documented elsewhere. These apothecia are sessile (attached directly to the surface without stalks) and can be found either scattered or densely clustered, in which case they may become angularly compressed where they meet. The thalline margin (rim around the apothecium formed by the thallus) is entire to flexuose (wavy), white to grey in colour, barely raised, and may become almost excluded as the apothecium matures. The disc at the centre of each apothecium is pale brown to grey-brown, flat to slightly convex, and lacks pruina (a powdery coating).

Internally, the epithecium (upper layer of the reproductive structure) is colourless and granular. The hymenium (the fertile layer containing asci) measures 45–60 μm in height, though thinner measurements (15–20 μm) have been reported elsewhere. The paraphyses (sterile filaments between the asci) are 1.5–2 μm in diameter, unbranched or sparsely branched, with slightly swollen tips. The ascospores (spores produced in asci) measure 8–12 by 3–4 μm and are narrowly ellipsoidal in shape.

When tested with common chemical spot tests used in lichen identification, the species is C− and K−, Pd−, UV−, and either a weakly positive yellow reaction or no reaction to KC. The lichen contains usnic acid, isorangiformic acid, and zeorin.

== Habitat and distribution ==
Lecanora stenotropa primarily inhabits rough siliceous rock surfaces, with a particular affinity for sandstone walls and memorials. It thrives in locations where calcium-rich water seeps from mortar joints, creating favourable conditions. This lichen species is occasionally found on processed timber or directly on basic substrates, though these occurrences are uncommon. It shows a tolerance for, and even preference toward, environments affected by air pollution. It is widespread in the United Kingdom, Germany, Poland, Spain, and Italy are also part of the lichen's European distribution. It was recorded from Antarctica for the first time in 2016. L. stenotropa also occurs in North America (Canada), South America (Bolivia), and New Zealand.

== See also ==
- List of Lecanora species
