= Galvinoxyl =

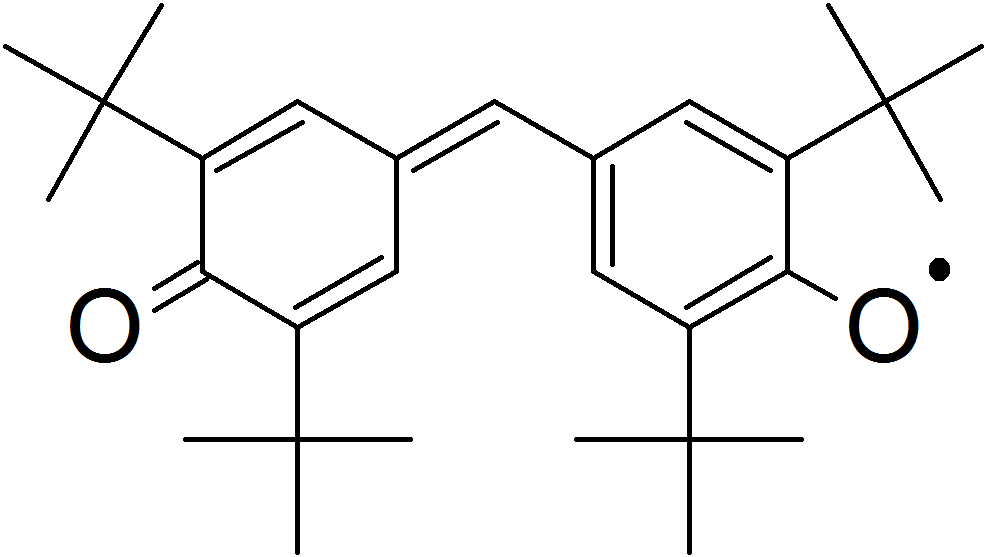

Names
- Preferred IUPAC name 4-[(3,5-Di-tert-butyl-4-oxocyclohexa-2,5-dien-1-ylidene)methyl]-2,6-di-tert-butylphenoxyl

Identifiers
CAS Number	2370-18-5
3D model (JSmol)	Interactive image
ChemSpider	52083310
ECHA InfoCard	100.017.395
EC Number	219-133-2
PubChem CID	2723634
UNII	W07Q6T5546
CompTox Dashboard (EPA)	DTXSID401015731
- InChI: InChI=1S/C29H41O2/c1-26(2,3)20-14-18(15-21(24(20)30)27(4,5)6)13-19-16-22(28(7,8)9)25(31)23(17-19)29(10,11)12/h13-17H,1-12H3 Key: GNZDAXRYGVFYPU-UHFFFAOYSA-N
- SMILES: CC(C)(C)C1=CC(=CC(=C1[O])C(C)(C)C)C=C2C=C(C(=O)C(=C2)C(C)(C)C)C(C)(C)C

Properties
Chemical formula	C_{29}H_{41}O_{2}
Molar mass	421.645 g·mol^{−1}
- Except where otherwise noted, data are given for materials in their standard state (at 25 °C [77 °F], 100 kPa). Infobox references

Galvinoxyl is a commercially available radical scavenger. It finds use both as a probe for studying radical reactions and as an inhibitor of radical polymerization. It may be synthesized by oxidation of the parent phenol with lead dioxide or potassium hexacyanoferrate(III). Its radical structure is confirmed by the loss of the O–H stretch in the IR spectrum and by electron spin resonance; it is stable even in the presence of oxygen.
