= C28H34O15 =

The molecular formula C_{28}H_{34}O_{15} (molar mass: 610.56 g/mol, exact mass: 610.1898 u) may refer to:

- Hesperidin
- Neohesperidin
