= C27H31O15 =

The molecular formula C_{27}H_{31}O_{15}^{+} (molar mass: 595.53 g/mol, exact mass: 595.1663 u) may refer to:

- Antirrhinin
- Pelargonin
