= C27H30O14 =

The molecular formula C_{27}H_{30}O_{14} (molar mass: 578.52 g/mol, exact mass: 578.1636 u) may refer to:

- Kaempferitrin, a flavonol
- Rhoifolin, a flavone
