= C27H32O14 =

The molecular formula C_{27}H_{32}O_{14} (molar mass: 580.54 g/mol, exact mass: 580.1792 u) may refer to:

- Naringin
- Narirutin
