= Hydrocortamate =

Chemical compound

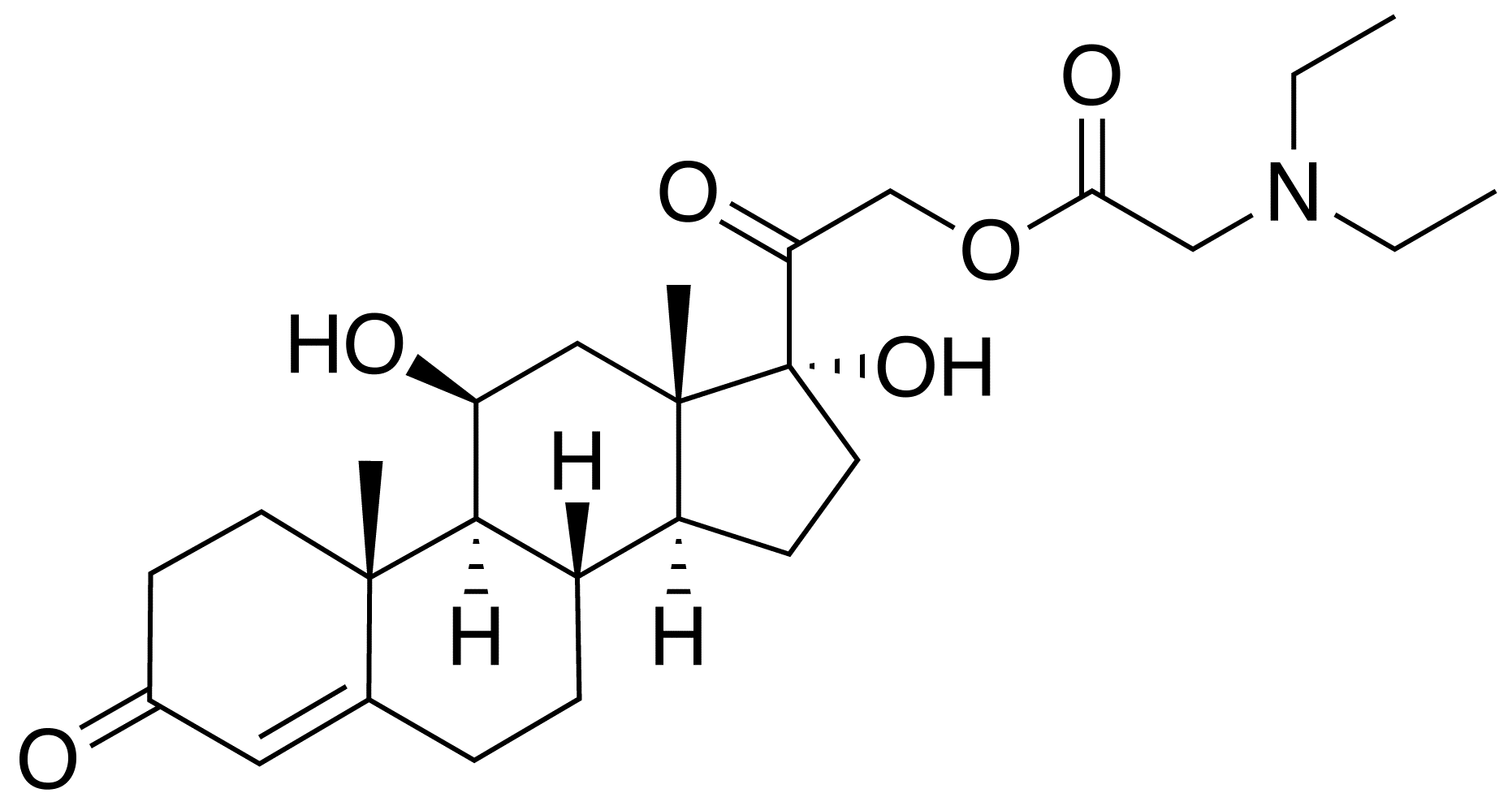

Clinical data
- Trade names: Magnacort, Ulcort
- Other names: 11β,17α-Dihydroxy-3,20-dioxopregn-4-en-21-yl N,N-diethylglycinate
- Routes of administration: Topical

Pharmacokinetic data
- Excretion: Hepatic

Identifiers
- IUPAC name: [2-(11,17-dihydroxy-10,13-dimethyl-3-oxo-2,6,7,8,9,11,12,14,15, 16-decahydro-1H-cyclopenta[a]phenanthren-17-yl)-2-oxoethyl] 2-(diethylamino)acetate
- CAS Number: 76-47-1
- PubChem CID: 408334
- PubChem SID: 46509076
- DrugBank: DB00769
- ChemSpider: 361312
- UNII: Y3N00BK5WK
- ChEBI: CHEBI:50851
- ChEMBL: ChEMBL1201263
- CompTox Dashboard (EPA): DTXSID1057824
- ECHA InfoCard: 100.000.877

Chemical and physical data
- Formula: C_{27}H_{41}NO_{6}
- Molar mass: 475.626 g·mol^{−1}
- 3D model (JSmol): Interactive image
- SMILES: [H][C@@]12CCC3=CC(=O)CC[C@]3(C)[C@@]1([H])[C@@H](O)C[C@@]1(C)[C@@]2([H])CC[C@]1(O)C(=O)COC(=O)CN(CC)CC
- InChI: InChI=1S/C27H41NO6/c1-5-28(6-2)15-23(32)34-16-22(31)27(33)12-10-20-19-8- 7-17-13-18(29)9-11-25(17,3)24(19)21(30)14-26(20,27)4/h13,19-21,24,30, 33H,5-12,14-16H2,1-4H3; Key:FWFVLWGEFDIZMJ-UHFFFAOYSA-N

Hydrocortamate (brand names Magnacort, Ulcortis) is a synthetic glucocorticoid with anti-inflammatory and immunosuppressive properties. It is used topically to treat inflammation due to corticosteroid-responsive dermatoses.
