= C26H30O11 =

The molecular formula C_{26}H_{30}O_{11} (molar mass: 518.50 g/mol, exact mass: 518.1788 u) may refer to:

- Phellamurin
- Rubratoxin B
