= Fungisterol =

Names
- IUPAC name 5α-Ergost-7-en-3β-ol
- Systematic IUPAC name (1R,3aR,5aS,7S,9aS,9bR,11aR)-1-[(2R,5S)-5,6-Dimethylheptan-2-yl]-9a,11a-dimethyl-2,3,3a,5,5a,6,7,8,9,9a,9b,10,11,11a-tetradecahydro-1H-cyclopenta[a]phenanthren-7-ol

Identifiers
CAS Number	516-78-9
3D model (JSmol)	Interactive image
ChEBI	CHEBI:69432
ChemSpider	4446739
ECHA InfoCard	100.007.479
EC Number	208-225-8
PubChem CID	5283646
UNII	XM6JVX97IY
CompTox Dashboard (EPA)	DTXSID201026572
- InChI: InChI=1S/C28H48O/c1-18(2)19(3)7-8-20(4)24-11-12-25-23-10-9-21-17-22(29)13-15-27(21,5)26(23)14-16-28(24,25)6/h10,18-22,24-26,29H,7-9,11-17H2,1-6H3/t19-,20+,21-,22-,24+,25-,26-,27-,28+/m0/s1 Key: PUGBZUWUTZUUCP-ZRKHGVCBSA-N
- SMILES: CC(C)[C@@H](C)CC[C@@H](C)[C@H]1CC[C@H]2C3=CC[C@H]4C[C@@H](O)CC[C@]4(C)[C@H]3CC[C@]12C

Properties
Chemical formula	C_{28}H_{48}O
Molar mass	400.691 g·mol^{−1}
- Except where otherwise noted, data are given for materials in their standard state (at 25 °C [77 °F], 100 kPa). Infobox references

Fungisterol is a bio-active sterol made by certain fungi.
