= Rubicene =

- A sample of rubicene

Names
- IUPAC name Rubicene

Identifiers
| CAS Number | 197-61-5 |
| 3D model (JSmol) | Interactive image |
| Beilstein Reference | 1914846 |
| ChEBI | CHEBI:33095 |
| ChemSpider | 60779 |
| ECHA InfoCard | 100.005.364 |
| EC Number | 205-899-5 |
| PubChem CID | 67454 |
| UNII | J3I9M3715F |
| CompTox Dashboard (EPA) | DTXSID00173364 |
- InChI: InChI=1S/C26H14/c1-3-9-17-15(7-1)19-11-5-13-22-24-18-10-4-2-8-16(18)20-12-6-14-21(26(20)24)23(17)25(19)22/h1-14H Key: FMKFBRKHHLWKDB-UHFFFAOYSA-N
- SMILES: C1=CC=C2C(=C1)C3=C4C2=C5C=CC=C6C5=C(C4=CC=C3)C7=CC=CC=C76

Properties
| Chemical formula | C_{26}H_{14} |
| Molar mass | 326.398 g·mol^{−1} |
| Appearance | Red solid |
| Melting point | 306 °C (583 °F; 579 K) |
| Solubility | Insoluble in ethanol and benzene |
- Except where otherwise noted, data are given for materials in their standard state (at 25 °C [77 °F], 100 kPa). Infobox references

Rubicene is a polycyclic aromatic hydrocarbon that consists of two benzene and an anthracene. They are each linked by two carbon–carbon bonds. Dilute solutions of rubicene emit strong yellow fluorescence, while the solid compound is red. It's synthesized from fluorenone by reduction of calcium or magnesium, or it can be obtained by reacting with dihalogenated diphenylanthracene as raw material. It can also be obtained by reacting 9,10-diphenylanthracene and 3 parts of DDQ in dichloromethane in the presence of triflic acid.
