= Stanol ester =

Class of chemical compounds

Stanol esters is a heterogeneous group of chemical compounds known to reduce the level of low-density lipoprotein (LDL) cholesterol in blood when ingested, though to a much lesser degree than prescription drugs such as statins. The starting material is phytosterols from plants. These are first hydrogenated to give a plant stanol (phytostanol) which is then esterified with a mixture of fatty acids also derived from plants. Plant stanol esters are found naturally, occurring in small quantities in fruits, vegetables, nuts, seeds, cereals, legumes, and vegetable oils.

Stanol ester is often added to rapeseed oil-based margarine or other foods for its health benefits. Studies have indicated that consumption of about 2-3 grams per day provides a reduction in LDL cholesterol of about 10-15%.

The compound itself passes through the gut, with very little entering the blood stream or lymph. Its presence in the gut, however, reduces both the amount of cholesterol the body absorbs from food and the reabsorption of the cholesterol component of bile. Despite a well documented cholesterol lowering effect, there are no data available indicating that functional foods supplemented with plant sterol esters reduce cardiovascular events. They are used in food products such as Benecol.

Sterol esters can also be used for the same purpose. These compounds have the same effect to LDL, but they are partially absorbed by the body. The effects of higher serum plant sterol levels are so far not completely understood.

== Plant stanols in nature ==
Plant sterols are cholesterol-like molecules found in all plant foods, with the highest concentrations occurring in vegetable oils. Plant sterols are plant equivalents of cholesterol and have a very similar molecular structure. According to their structure, they can be divided into sterols and stanols, stanols being a saturated subgroup of sterols.

== Plant stanols in human nutrition ==
Plant stanols are present in small amounts in human diet. Their main sources are whole-grain foods, mostly wheat and rye. The daily intake of stanols in the average western diet is about 60 mg/d, whereas the intake of plant sterols is about 150–300 mg/d and that of cholesterol is 500–800 mg/d. The relatively low natural levels of stanols in the diet are too low to have a significant effect on serum cholesterol levels.

Following evidence from toxicological studies and numerous clinical trials, stanols are characterised as safe by authorities in several European Union countries and by the US Food and Drug Administration (FDA).

== Structure and properties ==
Stanol esters are a saturated subgroup of sterol esters. Plant stanol esters in Benecol products are fatty acid esters of plant sterols. The sterol part of the molecule is sitostanol or campestanol while the fatty acid residue originates from different vegetable oils.

Plant stanol esters have the following physical properties:

- Fat-like with a waxy texture
- Creamy white colour in the solid form
- Viscous clear liquid with a bright yellow colour, bland odour and taste
- Insoluble in water and soluble in fat (hydrophobic)
- Viscosity higher than that of the triglyceride oil with the same fatty acid composition.

These physical properties can be tailored by changing the fatty acid composition. In different technological applications of Benecol products, the fatty acid part is selected so that the melting properties, texture and other characteristics of the plant stanol ester closely resemble the properties of the fat it replaces.

== Oxidative and processing stability ==
Under normal storage and food preparation conditions, plant stanol esters are very stable because they are more resistant to oxidation than the commonest vegetable oils.

Using plant stanol esters in food applications instead of conventional fats does not decrease the shelf life of the end product. As is the case for all fats and oils, stanol esters should be protected from heat, air and light to prevent oxidation. If long-term storage is required, plant stanol esters are typically refrigerated in solid form. Furthermore, the usual antioxidants can be added to plant stanol ester products as they are to other oils or fats to minimise oxidation.

== Lowering cholesterol ==
Esterified plant stanols have been proven to reduce cholesterol in a number of randomised, placebo-controlled double-blind clinical trials. However absolutely no effect on clinical endpoints such as CVD or mortality was demonstrated.

== Dual effect of plant stanols ==
Plant stanols reduce both cholesterol and plant sterol levels in serum. This may be of importance since elevated plant sterol concentrations have been identified as an independent risk factor for coronary heart disease (CHD). Two ABC transporters (ABCG5 and ABCG8) play an important role in the regulating the intestinal absorption of plant sterols by resecreting previously absorbed plant sterols from the enterocytes back into the intestinal lumen.

Mutations in these transporter proteins lead to a rare congenital disease called sitosterolaemia, which is characterised by:

- severely elevated serum plant sterol concentrations,
- normal to moderately increased serum cholesterol concentrations, and
- a high risk of developing CHD at a very early age.

It was recently shown that polymorphisms in the ABCG5 and ABCG8 genes contribute to modifying serum plant sterol levels in healthy, non-sitosterolaemic individuals. Furthermore, several epidemiological studies have shown that the risk of developing heart disease seems to be increased even at more "normal" plant sterol levels. Since statins were shown to increase serum plant sterol concentrations, patients should probably not be treated with statins alone but with a combination therapy focusing simultaneously on improving the serum lipoprotein profile and lowering serum plant sterol concentrations.

=== Cholesterol absorption ===
The molecular mode of actions of stanols has been described in several preclinical and clinical trials and can be divided into two steps:

- Step 1: Cholesterol absorption occurs via the formation of micelles with bile acids. Stanols displace cholesterol from these micelles so that less cholesterol is absorbed. Stanols need to be taken as part of a meal in order to be incorporated in the micelles.
- Step 2: In vitro studies have shown that stanols activate LXR alpha, LXR beta and ABCA1 transporter proteins. It is thus hypothesised that stanols work in enterocytes by activating the excretion of cholesterol back into the intestinal lumen. Only stanols have been proven to retain their efficacy in long-term use, most likely due to the minimal absorption of stanols, and consequently their lack of effect on bile acid metabolism.

As a consequence of the reduced absorption of cholesterol, the absorption of fat-soluble components other than cholesterol, such as vitamins and antioxidants, may also be reduced. Like cholesterol, carotenoids and tocopherols are transported by lipoproteins. Since the number of LDL particles in circulation decreases after consumption of plant sterols or stanols, plasma concentrations of carotenoids and tocopherols also decrease. This is why these antioxidants are often standardized to plasma lipid concentrations.

The results of randomised, placebo-controlled trials on the effects of plant sterols or stanols on fat-soluble vitamins and antioxidants were summarised in 2003. Significant reductions were only seen in clinical trials for hydrocarbon carotenoids. These reductions are probably caused by reduced absorption and lower plasma concentrations of the carrier, LDL.

After correcting for cholesterol levels, only the reduction in the β-carotene level remained. It is important, however, that carotenoid and tocopherol levels remained within the normal ranges. Clinical trials also showed that when following the recommended diet, including consumption of vegetables and fruit, carotenoid levels did not decrease. Plasma concentrations of retinol (vitamin A), 25-hydroxyvitamin D and vitamin K are unaffected by dietary plant sterols and stanols.

== See also ==
- Benecol
