= Β-Sitosterol =

β-Sitosterol

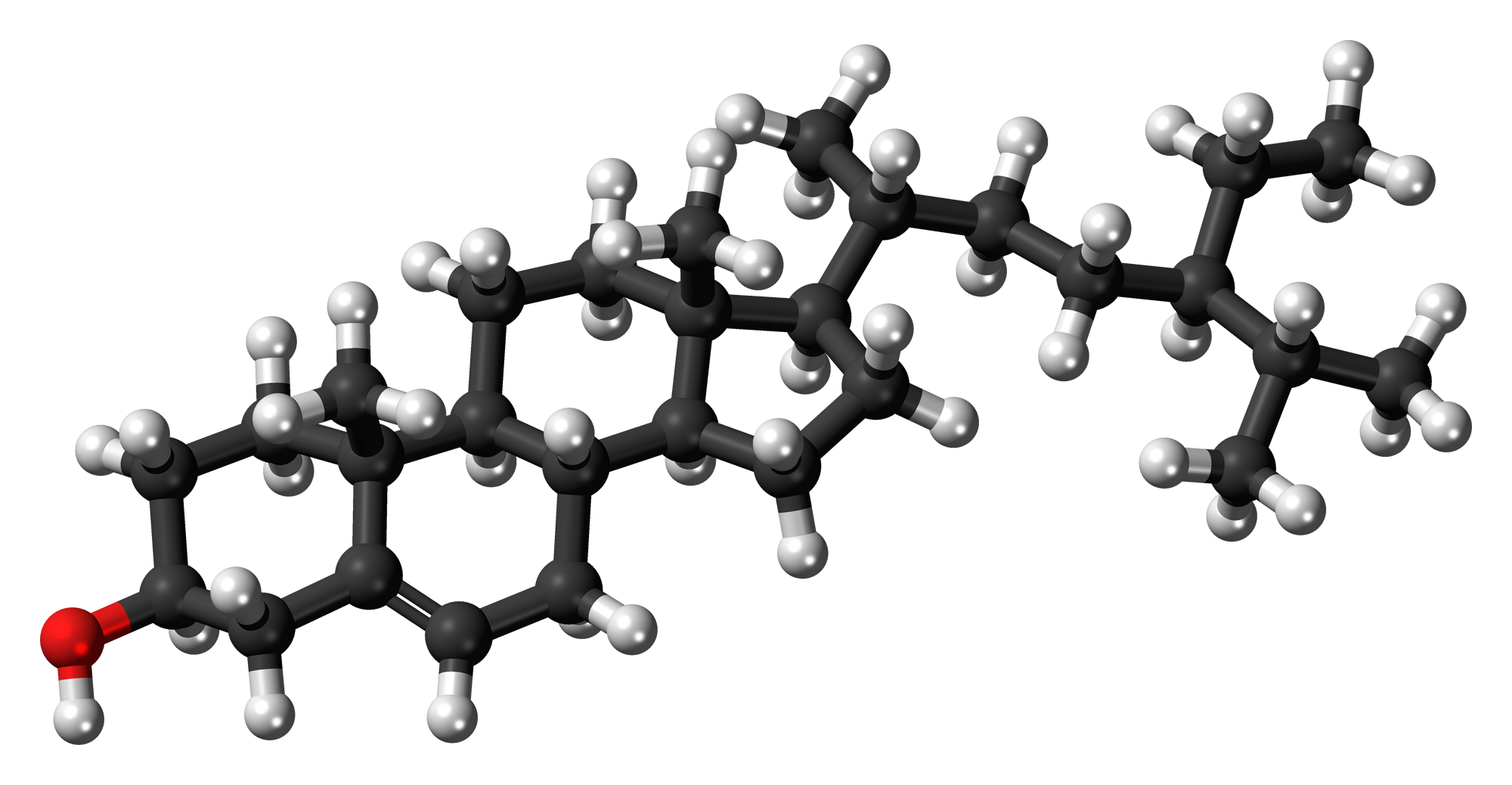

Names
- IUPAC name Stigmast-5-en-3β-ol
- Systematic IUPAC name (1R,3aS,3bS,7S,9aR,9bS,11aR)-1-[(2R,5R)-5-Ethyl-6-methylheptan-2-yl]-9a,11a-dimethyl-2,3,3a,3b,4,6,7,8,9,9a,9b,10,11,11a-tetradecahydro-1H-cyclopenta[a]phenanthren-7-ol
- Other names 22,23-Dihydrostigmasterol, β-Sitosterin

Identifiers
| CAS Number | 83-46-5 |
| 3D model (JSmol) | Interactive image |
| ChEBI | CHEBI:27693 |
| ChEMBL | ChEMBL221542 |
| ChemSpider | 192962 |
| ECHA InfoCard | 100.001.346 |
| PubChem CID | 222284 |
| UNII | S347WMO6M4 |
| CompTox Dashboard (EPA) | DTXSID5022481 |
- InChI: InChI=1S/C29H50O/c1-7-21(19(2)3)9-8-20(4)25-12-13-26-24-11-10-22-18-23(30)14-16-28(22,5)27(24)15-17-29(25,26)6/h10,19-21,23-27,30H,7-9,11-18H2,1-6H3/t20-,21-,23+,24+,25-,26+,27+,28+,29-/m1/s1 Key: KZJWDPNRJALLNS-VJSFXXLFSA-N; InChI=1/C29H50O/c1-7-21(19(2)3)9-8-20(4)25-12-13-26-24-11-10-22-18-23(30)14-16-28(22,5)27(24)15-17-29(25,26)6/h10,19-21,23-27,30H,7-9,11-18H2,1-6H3/t20-,21-,23+,24+,25-,26+,27+,28+,29-/m1/s1 Key: KZJWDPNRJALLNS-VJSFXXLFBZ
- SMILES: O[C@@H]4C/C3=C/C[C@@H]1[C@H](CC[C@]2([C@H]1CC[C@@H]2[C@H](C)CC[C@@H](CC)C(C)C)C)[C@@]3(C)CC4

Properties
| Chemical formula | C_{29}H_{50}O |
| Molar mass | 414.718 g·mol^{−1} |
| Melting point | 136 to 140 °C (277 to 284 °F; 409 to 413 K) |
- Except where otherwise noted, data are given for materials in their standard state (at 25 °C [77 °F], 100 kPa). verify (what is ?) Infobox references

β-Sitosterol (beta-sitosterol) is one of several phytosterols (plant sterols) with chemical structures similar to that of cholesterol. It is a white, waxy powder with a characteristic odor, and is one of the components of the food additive E499. Phytosterols are hydrophobic and soluble in alcohols.

== Natural occurrences and food ==
β-Sitosterol is widely distributed in the plant kingdom. It is found in vegetable oil, nuts, avocados, and derived prepared foods such as salad dressings. Olavius algarvensis, a species of marine annelid, predominantly incorporate β-sitosterol into their cell membranes instead of cholesterol, though cholesterol is also present in said membranes.

== Human research ==
β-Sitosterol is being studied for its potential to reduce benign prostatic hyperplasia (BPH) and blood cholesterol levels. β-Sitosterol is the active ingredient in the burn ointment MEBO. However, its efficacy lacks high-quality evidence.

== Genetic disorder ==
While plant sterols are usually beneficial, there is a rare autosomal recessive genetic disorder phytosterolemia which causes over-absorption of phytosterols.

== Precursor of anabolic steroid boldenone ==
Being a steroid, β-sitosterol is a precursor of anabolic steroid boldenone. Boldenone undecylenate is commonly used in veterinary medicine to induce growth in cattle but it is also one of the most commonly abused anabolic steroids in sports. This led to suspicion that some athletes testing positive on boldenone undecylenate did not actually abuse the hormone itself but consumed food rich in β-sitosterol.

== Chemistry ==
=== Chemical engineering ===
The use of β-sitosterol as a chemical intermediate was for many years limited due to the lack of a chemical point of attack on the side-chain that would permit its removal. Extensive efforts on the part of many laboratories eventually led to the discovery of a pseudomonas microbe that efficiently effected that transformation. Fermentation digests the entire aliphatic side-chain at carbon 17 to afford a mixture of 17-keto products including dehydroepiandrosterone.

=== Synthesis ===
Total synthesis of β-sitosterol has not been achieved. However, β-sitosterol has been synthesized from stigmasterol 1, which involves a specific hydrogenation of the side-chain of stigmasterol.

The first step in the synthesis forms stigmasterol tosylate 2 from stigmasterol 1 (95% purity) using p-TsCl, DMAP, and pyridine (90% yield). The tosylate 2 then undergoes solvolysis as it is treated with pyridine and anhydrous MeOH to give a 5:1 ratio of i-stigmasterol methyl ether 3 (74% yield) to stigmasterol methyl ether 4, which is subsequently removed by chromatography. The hydrogenation step of a previously proposed synthesis involved the catalyst Pd/C and the solvent ethyl acetate. However, due to isomerisation during hydrolysis, other catalysts, such as PtO_{2}, and solvents, such as ethanol, were tested. There was little change with the use of a different catalyst. Ethanol, however, prevented isomerisation and the formation of the unidentified impurity to give compound 5. The last step of the synthesis is deprotection of the β-ring double bond of 5 with p-TsOH, aqueous dioxane, and heat (80 °C) to yield β-sitosterol 6. The cumulative yield for the final two steps was 55%, and the total yield for the synthesis was 37%.

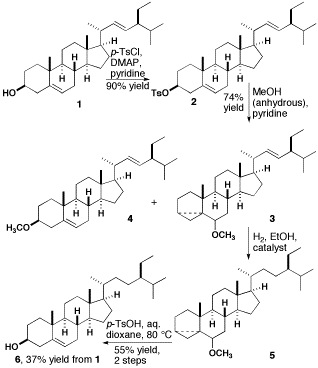

== Biosynthesis ==
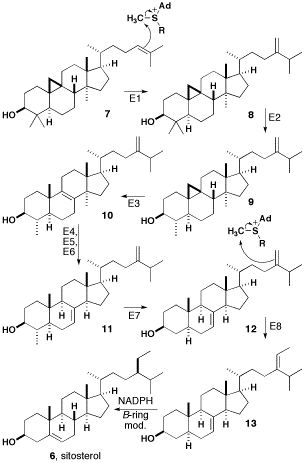
Biosynthesis of β-sitosterol (6) from cycloartenol (7)

The regulation of the biosynthesis of both sterols and some specific lipids occurs during membrane biogenesis. Through 13C-labeling patterns, it has been determined that both the mevalonate and deoxyxylulose pathways are involved in the formation of β-sitosterol. The precise mechanism of β-sitosterol formation varies according to the organism, but is generally found to come from cycloartenol.

The biosynthesis of cycloartenol begins as one molecule of isopentenyl diphosphate (IPP) and two molecules of dimethylallyl diphosphate (DMAPP) form farnesyl diphosphate (FPP). Two molecules of FPP are then joined tail-to-tail to yield squalene, a triterpene. Squalene, through a cyclization reaction with 2,3-oxidosqualene 6 as an intermediate forms cycloartenol.

The double bond of cycloartenol (compound 7 in diagram) is methylated by SAM to give a carbocation that undergoes a hydride shift and loses a proton to yield a compound with a methylene side-chain. Both of these steps are catalyzed by sterol C-24 methyltransferase (Step E1 in diagram). Compound 8 is then catalyzed by sterol C-4 demethylase (E2) and loses a methyl group to produce cycloeucalenol. Subsequent to this, the cyclopropane ring is opened with cycloeucalenol cycloisomerase (E3) to form 10. Compound 10 loses a methyl group and undergoes an allylic isomerization to form gramisterol 11. This step is catalyzed by sterol C-14 demethylase (E4), sterol Δ14-reductase (E5), and sterol Δ8-Δ7-isomerase (E6). The last methyl group is removed by sterol demethylase (E7) to form episterol 12. Episterol 12 is methylated by SAM to produce a second carbocation, which loses a proton to yield 13. This step is catalyzed by 24-methylenesterol C-methyltransferase (E8). Compound 13 now undergoes reduction by NADPH and modifications in the β-ring to form β-sitosterol. An alternative pathway is described for phytosterol synthesis in some animals, a key enzyme responsible is the sterolmethyltransferase (SMT).

== See also ==
- Charantin, a β-sitosteryl glucoside found in the bitter melon plant.
