= Fecosterol =

Names
- IUPAC name 5α-Campesta-8,24(24^{1})-dien-3β-ol
- Systematic IUPAC name (1R,3aR,5aS,7S,9aS,11aR)-9a,11a-Dimethyl-1-[(2R)-6-methyl-5-methylideneheptan-2-yl]-2,3,3a,4,5,5a,6,7,8,9,9a,10,11,11a-tetradecahydro-1H-cyclopenta[a]phenanthren-7-ol

Identifiers
CAS Number	516-86-9
3D model (JSmol)	Interactive image
ChemSpider	389329
KEGG	C04525
PubChem CID	440371
UNII	48A2TY6K38
CompTox Dashboard (EPA)	DTXSID90199553
- InChI: InChI=1S/C28H46O/c1-18(2)19(3)7-8-20(4)24-11-12-25-23-10-9-21-17-22(29)13-15-27(21,5)26(23)14-16-28(24,25)6/h18,20-22,24-25,29H,3,7-17H2,1-2,4-6H3/t20-,21+,22+,24-,25+,27+,28-/m1/s1 Key: SLQKYSPHBZMASJ-QKPORZECSA-N; InChI=1/C28H46O/c1-18(2)19(3)7-8-20(4)24-11-12-25-23-10-9-21-17-22(29)13-15-27(21,5)26(23)14-16-28(24,25)6/h18,20-22,24-25,29H,3,7-17H2,1-2,4-6H3/t20-,21+,22+,24-,25+,27+,28-/m1/s1 Key: SLQKYSPHBZMASJ-QKPORZECBD
- SMILES: C[C@H](CCC(=C)C(C)C)[C@H]1CC[C@@H]2[C@@]1(CCC3=C2CC[C@@H]4[C@@]3(CC[C@@H](C4)O)C)C

Properties
Chemical formula	C_{28}H_{46}O
Molar mass	398.675 g·mol^{−1}
- Except where otherwise noted, data are given for materials in their standard state (at 25 °C [77 °F], 100 kPa). Infobox references

Fecosterol is a sterol made by certain fungi and lichens.
