= Cyanidin-3,5-O-diglucoside =

Cyanin
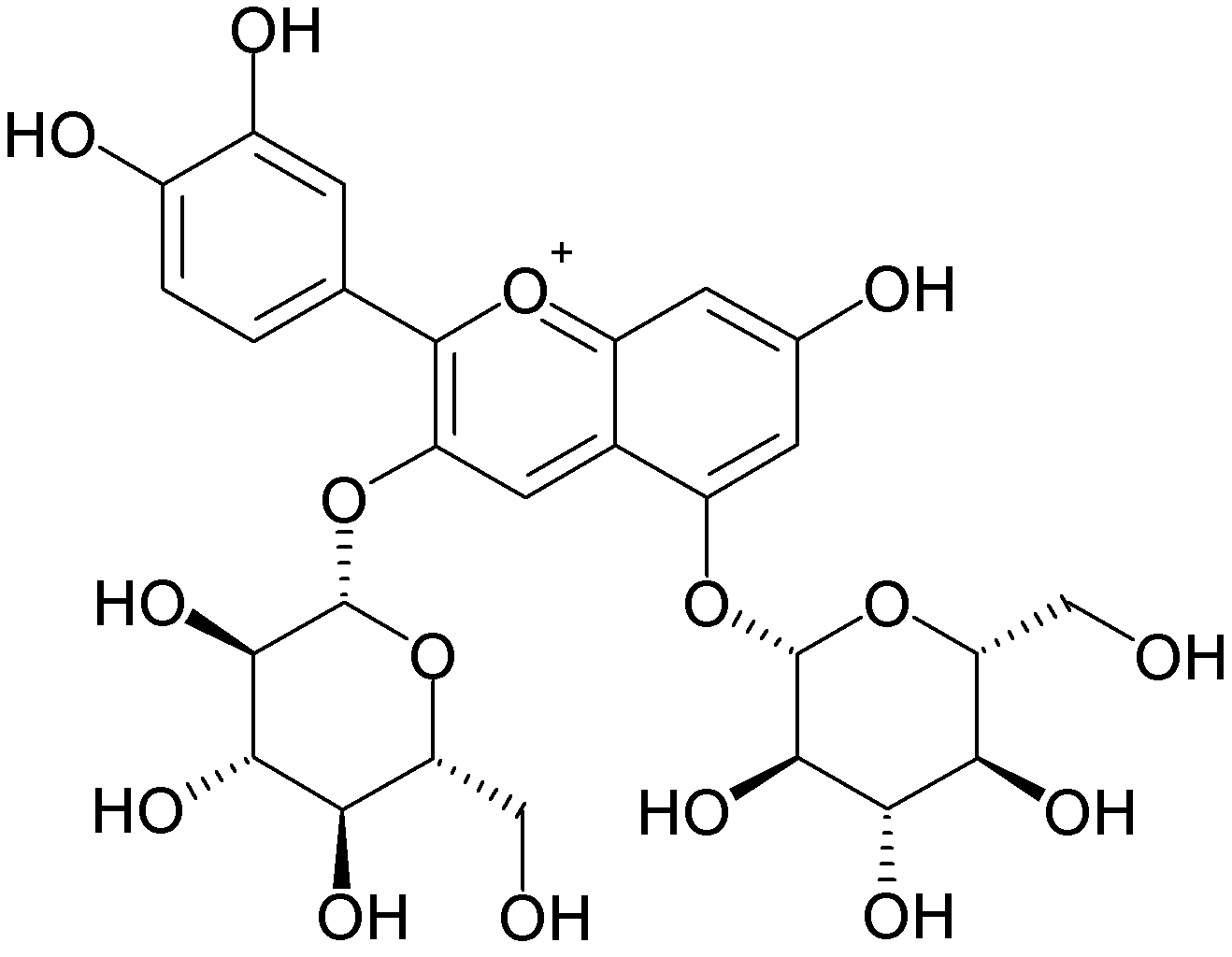

Names
- IUPAC name 3,5-Bis(β-D-glucopyranosyloxy)-3′,4′,7-trihydroxyflavylium
- Systematic IUPAC name 2-(3,4-Dihydroxyphenyl)-7-hydroxy-3,5-bis{[(2S,3R,4S,5S,6R)-3,4,5-trihydroxy-6-(hydroxymethyl)oxan-2-yl]oxy}-1λ^{4}-benzopyran-1-ylium
- Other names Cyanidin 3,5-O-diglucoside

Identifiers
CAS Number	2611-67-8
3D model (JSmol)	Interactive image
Beilstein Reference	1417221
ChEBI	CHEBI:3978
ChEMBL	ChEMBL2425137
ChemSpider	390301
ECHA InfoCard	100.018.214
EC Number	220-034-1
KEGG	C08639
PubChem CID	441688
UNII	UTH12733J3
CompTox Dashboard (EPA)	DTXSID70331611
- InChI: InChI=1S/C27H30O16/c28-7-17-19(33)21(35)23(37)26(42-17)40-15-5-10(30)4-14-11(15)6-16(25(39-14)9-1-2-12(31)13(32)3-9)41-27-24(38)22(36)20(34)18(8-29)43-27/h1-6,17-24,26-29,33-38H,7-8H2,(H2-,30,31,32)/p+1/t17-,18-,19-,20-,21+,22+,23-,24-,26-,27-/m1/s1 Key: RDFLLVCQYHQOBU-ZOTFFYTFSA-O
- SMILES: c1cc(c(cc1c2c(cc3c([o+]2)cc(cc3O[C@H]4[C@@H]([C@H]([C@@H]([C@H](O4)CO)O)O)O)O)O[C@H]5[C@@H]([C@H]([C@@H]([C@H](O5)CO)O)O)O)O)O

Properties
Chemical formula	C_{27}H_{31}O_{16}
Molar mass	611.52 g/mol (chloride 647 g/mol)
- Except where otherwise noted, data are given for materials in their standard state (at 25 °C [77 °F], 100 kPa). Infobox references

Cyanidin-3,5-O-diglucoside, also known as cyanin, is an anthocyanin. It is the 3,5-O-diglucoside of cyanidin.

== Natural occurrences ==
Cyanin can be found in species of the genus Rhaponticum (Asteraceae).

=== In food ===
Cyanin can be found in red wine as well as pomegranate juice according to a study done by Graça Miguel, Susana Dandlen, Dulce Antunes, Alcinda Neves, and Denise Martins in the winter of 2004. Pomegranate juice extracted through centrifugal seed separation has higher amounts of cyanidin-3,5-O-diglucoside than juice extracted by squeezing fruit halves with an electric lemon squeezer.

== See also ==
- Phenolic content in wine
