= Sterol ester =

Class of chemical compounds

Sterol esters are a heterogeneous group of chemical compounds. They are created when the hydroxyl group of a sterol and a fatty acid undergo an esterification reaction. They can be found in trace amounts in every cell type but are highly enriched in foam cells and are common components of human skin oil.

Plant sterol (phytosterol) esters have been shown to reduce the level of low-density lipoprotein (LDL) cholesterol in blood when ingested. Plant sterol esters used for dietary supplements are made from phytosterols and fatty acids also derived from plants. They are added to certain oil-containing products like margarine, milk, or yogurt to make functional foods for controlling cholesterol levels. Studies have indicated that consumption of about 2 grams per day of phytosterol esters provides a reduction in LDL cholesterol of around 10%. Sterol esters are added to certain Unilever products under the brand name Becel/Flora.

== See also ==
- Stanol ester
- Sitosterolemia
