= Phytosterol =

Class of steroids derived from plants

β-sitosterol, a prototypical phytosterol

Phytosterols are phytosteroids, similar to cholesterol, that serve as structural components of biological membranes of plants. They encompass plant sterols and stanols. More than 250 sterols and related compounds have been identified. Free phytosterols extracted from oils are insoluble in water, relatively insoluble in oil, and soluble in alcohols.

Phytosterol-enriched foods and dietary supplements have been marketed for decades. Despite well-documented LDL cholesterol-lowering effects from long-term consumption of phytosterols, typically in the range of about 5-10%, there is no conclusive evidence from long‑term outcome trials that phytosterols themselves reduce the incidence of cardiovascular diseases, improve fasting blood sugar, or glycated hemoglobin levels, or overall mortality rate.

Expert reviews have therefore emphasized that phytosterol‑enriched products can be considered a dietary option for LDL‑cholesterol reduction, but that their impact on ‘hard’ cardiovascular endpoints and mortality remains to be established.

== Structure ==
Nomenclature of the structure of a tetracyclic damarane triterpene

They have a fused polycyclic structure and vary in carbon side chains and / or presence or absence of a double bond (saturation). They are divided into 4,4-dimethyl phytosterols, 4-monomethyl phytosterols, and 4-desmethyl phytosterols based on the location of methyl groups at the carbon-4 position. Stanols are saturated sterols, having no double bonds in the sterol ring structure.

The molecule in the article lead is β-sitosterol. The nomenclature is shown on the right.

- By removing carbon 24^{2}, campesterol is obtained.
- By removing carbons 24^{1} and 24^{2}, cholesterol is obtained.
- Removing a hydrogen from carbons 22 and 23 yields stigmasterol (stigmasta-5,22-dien-3β-ol).
- By hydrogenating the double bond between carbons 5 and 6, β-sitostanol (Stigmastanol) is obtained.
- By hydrogenating the double bond between carbons 5 and 6 and removing carbon 24^{2}, campestanol is obtained.
- Removing carbon 24^{2} and hydrogens from carbons 22 and 23, and inverting the stereochemistry at C-24 yields brassicasterol (ergosta-5,22-dien-3β-ol).
- Further removal of hydrogens from carbons 7 and 8 from brassicasterol yields ergosterol (ergosta-5,7,22-trien-3β-ol). Important: Ergosterol is not a plant sterol. Ergosterol is a component of fungal cell membranes, serving the same function in fungi that cholesterol serves in animal cells.

In addition:

- Esterification of the hydroxyl group at carbon 3 with fatty/organic acids or carbohydrates results in plant sterol esters, i.e. oleates, ferulates and (acyl) glycosides.
Structures of some common phytosterols

β-sitosterol

Campesterol

Stigmasterol

Stigmastanol

Campestanol

Brassicasterol

Cycloartenol
Structures of some common sterols, for comparison

Cholesterol

Ergosterol

== Dietary phytosterols ==
The richest naturally occurring sources of phytosterols are vegetable oils and products made from them. Sterols can be present in the free form and as fatty acid esters and glycolipids. The bound form is usually hydrolyzed in the small intestines by pancreatic enzymes. Some of the sterols are removed during the deodorization step of refining oils and fats, without, however, changing their relative composition. Sterols are therefore a useful tool in checking authenticity.

As common sources of phytosterols, vegetable oils have been developed as margarine products highlighting phytosterol content. Cereal products, vegetables, fruit and berries, which are not as rich in phytosterols, may also be significant sources of phytosterols due to their higher intakes.

The intake of naturally occurring phytosterols ranges between ~200–300 mg/day depending on eating habits. Specially designed vegetarian experimental diets have been produced yielding upwards of 700 mg/day. The most commonly occurring phytosterols in the human diet are β-sitosterol, campesterol and stigmasterol, which account for about 65%, 30% and 3% of diet contents, respectively. The most common plant stanols in the human diet are sitostanol and campestanol, which combined make up about 5% of dietary phytosterol.

Sterol composition in crude oils (as percentage of total sterol fraction)
	Cholesterol	Brassicasterol	Campesterol	Stigmasterol	β-Sitosterol	∆5-Avenasterol	∆7-Avenasterol	∆7-Stigmasterol
Coconut oil	0.6 – 2	0 – 0.9	7 – 10	12 – 18	50 – 70	5 – 16	0.6 – 2	2 – 8
Corn oil	0.2 – 0.6	0 – 0.2	18 – 24	4 – 8	55 – 67	4 – 8	1 – 3	1 – 4
Cottonseed oil	0.7 – 2.3	0.1 – 0.9	7.2 – 8.4	1.2 – 1.8	80 – 90	1.9 – 3.8	1.4 – 3.3	0.7 – 1.4
Olive oil	0 – 0.5		2.3 – 3.6	0.6 – 2	75.6 – 90	3.1 – 14		0 – 4
Palm oil	2.2 – 6.7		18.7 – 29.1	8.9 – 13.9	50.2 – 62.1	0 – 2.8	0 – 5.1	0.2 – 2.4
Palm kernel oil	1 – 3.7	0 – 0.3	8.4 – 12.7	12.3 – 16.1	62.6 – 70.4	4 – 9	0 – 1.4	0 – 2.1
Peanut oil	0.6 – 3.8	0 – 0.2	12 – 20	5 – 13	48 – 65	7 – 9	0 – 5	0 – 5
Rapeseed oil	0.4 – 2	5 – 13	18 – 39	0 – 0.7	45 – 58	0 – 6.6	0 – 0.8	0 – 5
Soybean oil	0.6 – 1.4	0 – 0.3	16 – 24	16 – 19	52 – 58	2 – 4	1 – 4.5	1.5 – 5
Sunflower oil	0.2 – 1.3	0 – 0.2	7 – 13	8 – 11	56 – 63	2 – 7	7 – 13	3 – 6

== Health claims ==
=== Europe ===
The European Foods Safety Authority (EFSA) concluded that blood cholesterol can be reduced on average by 7 to 10.5% if a person consumes 1.5 to 2.4 grams of plant sterols and stanols per day, an effect usually established within 2–3 weeks. Longer-term studies extending up to 85 weeks showed that the cholesterol-lowering effect could be sustained. Based on this and other efficacy data, the EFSA scientific panel provided the following health advisory: "Plant sterols have been shown to lower/reduce blood cholesterol. Blood cholesterol lowering may reduce the risk of coronary heart disease".

=== United States ===
The FDA has approved the following claim for phytosterols: For plant sterol esters: (i) Foods containing at least 0.65 g per serving of plant sterol esters, eaten twice a day with meals for a daily total intake of at least 1.3 g, as part of a diet low in saturated fat and cholesterol, may reduce the risk of heart disease. A serving of [name of the food] supplies ___grams of vegetable oil sterol esters. For plant stanol esters: (i) Foods containing at least 1.7 g per serving of plant stanol esters, eaten twice a day with meals for a total daily intake of at least 3.4 g, as part of a diet low in saturated fat and cholesterol, may reduce the risk of heart disease. A serving of [name of the food] supplies ___grams of plant stanol esters.

Reviewing clinical trials involving phytosterol supplementation, the FDA concluded that when consumed in the range of 1 to 3 grams in enriched foods, phytosterols resulted in statistically significant (5-15%) reductions in blood LDL cholesterol levels relative to placebo. The FDA also concluded that a daily dietary intake of 2 grams a day of phytosterols (expressed as non-esterified phytosterols) is required to demonstrate a relationship between phytosterol consumption and cholesterol lowering for reduced CVD risk.

=== Canada ===
Health Canada reviewed the evidence of 84 randomized controlled trials published between 1994 and 2007 involving phytosterol supplementation. An average 8.8% reduction in LDL-cholesterol was observed at a mean intake of 2 grams per day.

Health Canada concluded that sufficient scientific evidence exists to support a relationship between phytosterol consumption and blood cholesterol lowering. Based on this evidence, Health Canada approved the following statements for qualifying foods intended for hypercholesterolemic individuals: Primary statement: "[serving size from Nutrition Facts table in metric and common household measures] of [naming the product] provides X% of the daily amount* of plant sterols shown to help reduce/lower cholesterol in adults."

Two additional statements that could be used in combination or alone, adjacent to the primary statement, without any intervening printed, written or graphic material: "Plant sterols help reduce [or help lower] cholesterol." This statement when used, shall be shown in letters up to twice the size and prominence as those of the primary statement. "High cholesterol is a risk factor for heart disease." This statement when used, shall be shown in letters up to the same size and prominence as those of the primary statement.

=== Australia ===
Food Standards Australia New Zealand provided guidance concerning the addition of phytosterols in food manufacturing: "When eaten at the recommended amount, between 2 and 3 grams a day, plant sterols can reduce low-density lipoprotein cholesterol levels in our blood." Plant sterols added during manufacturing must be displayed on food labels.

== Cholesterol lowering ==
The ability of phytosterols to reduce cholesterol levels was first demonstrated in humans in 1953. From 1954 to 1982, phytosterols were subsequently marketed as a pharmaceutical under the name Cytellin as a treatment for elevated cholesterol. A 2014 review provided evidence for use of dietary phytosterols to attain a cholesterol-lowering effect.

Unlike the statins, where cholesterol lowering has been proved to reduce risk of cardiovascular diseases and overall mortality under well-defined circumstances, some evidence has indicated that phytosterol-enriched foods or supplements do not lower the risk of cardiovascular diseases.

Coadministration of statins with phytosterol-enriched foods increases the cholesterol-lowering effect of phytosterols. Statins work by reducing cholesterol synthesis via inhibition of the rate-limiting HMG-CoA reductase enzyme. Phytosterols reduce cholesterol levels by competing with cholesterol absorption in the gut via one or several possible mechanisms, an effect that complements statins. Phytosterols further reduce cholesterol levels by about 9% to 17% in statin users. The type or dose of statin does not appear to affect the cholesterol-lowering efficacy of phytosterols.

== Safety ==
Phytosterols have a long history of safe use, dating back to Cytellin, the pharmaceutical preparation of phytosterols marketed in the US from 1954 to 1982. Phytosterol esters have generally recognized as safe (GRAS) status in the US. Phytosterol-containing functional foods were subject to postlaunch monitoring after being introduced to the EU market in 2000, and no unpredicted side effects were reported.

A potential safety concern regarding phytosterol consumption is in patients with phytosterolaemia, a rare genetic disorder which results in a 50- to 100-fold increase in blood plant sterol levels and is associated with rapid development of coronary atherosclerosis. However, there is no direct evidence that phytosterols accelerate the development of atherosclerosis. On the other hand, a meta-analysis showed that premature atherosclerosis and resulting CVD observed in patients with sitosterolemia are attributable to severe hypercholesterolemia in their childhood. Also, one should keep in mind that dietary phytosterols do not meaningfully raise circulating phytosgterollevels even with having phytosterol-supplemented foods.

Phytosterolaemia has been linked to mutations in the ABCG5/G8 proteins which pump plant sterols out of enterocytes and hepatocytes into the lumen and bile ducts, respectively.

Plant sterol levels in the blood have been shown to be positively, negatively or not associated with CVD risk, depending on the study population investigated. The link between plant sterols and CVD or CHD risk is complicated because phytosterol levels reflect cholesterol absorption. (See Phytosterols as a marker for cholesterol absorption).

Sterols and stanols

The equivalent ability and safety of plant sterols and plant stanols to lower cholesterol continues to be a hotly debated topic. Plant sterols and stanols, when compared head-to-head in clinical trials, have been shown to equally reduce cholesterol levels. A meta-analysis of 14 randomized, controlled trials comparing plant sterols to plant stanols directly at doses of 0.6 to 2.5 g/day showed no difference between the two forms on total cholesterol, LDL cholesterol, HDL cholesterol, or triglyceride levels. Trials looking at high doses (> 4 g/day) of plant sterols or stanols are very limited, and none have yet to be completed comparing the same high dose of plant sterol to plant stanol.

The debate regarding sterol vs. stanol safety is centered on their differing intestinal absorption and resulting plasma concentrations. Phytostanols have a lower estimated intestinal absorption rate (0.02 - 0.3%) than phytosterols (0.4 - 5%) and consequently blood phytostanol concentration is generally lower than phytosterol concentration.

== Functions in plants ==
Sterols are essential for all eukaryotes. In contrast to animal and fungal cells, which contain only one major sterol, plant cells synthesize an array of sterol mixtures in which sitosterol and stigmasterol predominate. Sitosterol regulates membrane fluidity and permeability in a similar manner to cholesterol in mammalian cell membranes. Plant sterols can also modulate the activity of membrane-bound enzymes. Phytosterols are also linked to plant adaptation to temperature and plant immunity against pathogens.
