= Avenasterol =

Names
- IUPAC name (3β,24Z)-Stigmasta-7,24(28)-dien-3-ol
- Systematic IUPAC name (3S,5S,10S,13R)-10,13-Dimethyl-17-[(Z,2R)-5-propan-2-ylhept-5-en-2-yl]-2,3,4,5,6,9,11,12,14,15,16,17-dodecahydro-1H-cyclopenta[a]phenanthren-3-ol

Identifiers
CAS Number	23290-26-8
3D model (JSmol)	Interactive image
ChEBI	CHEBI:166888
ChemSpider	4444703
KEGG	C15782
PubChem CID	12795736
UNII	I0WYR6393O
- InChI: InChI=1S/C29H48O/c1-7-21(19(2)3)9-8-20(4)25-12-13-26-24-11-10-22-18-23(30)14-16-28(22,5)27(24)15-17-29(25,26)6/h7,11,19-20,22-23,25-27,30H,8-10,12-18H2,1-6H3/b21-7-/t20-,22+,23+,25-,26+,27+,28+,29-/m1/s1 Key: MCWVPSBQQXUCTB-OQTIOYDCSA-N
- SMILES: C[C@@]12[C@](C=3[C@@]([C@]4(C)[C@@](CC3)(C[C@@H](O)CC4)[H])(CC1)[H])(CC[C@@]2([C@@H](CC/C(/C(C)C)=C/C)C)[H])[H]

Properties
Chemical formula	C_{29}H_{48}O
Molar mass	412.702 g·mol^{−1}
Melting point	118–120 °C (244–248 °F; 391–393 K)
- Except where otherwise noted, data are given for materials in their standard state (at 25 °C [77 °F], 100 kPa). Infobox references

Avenasterol, or Δ-7-Avenasterol is a natural, stigmastane-type sterol.
