= Campesterol =

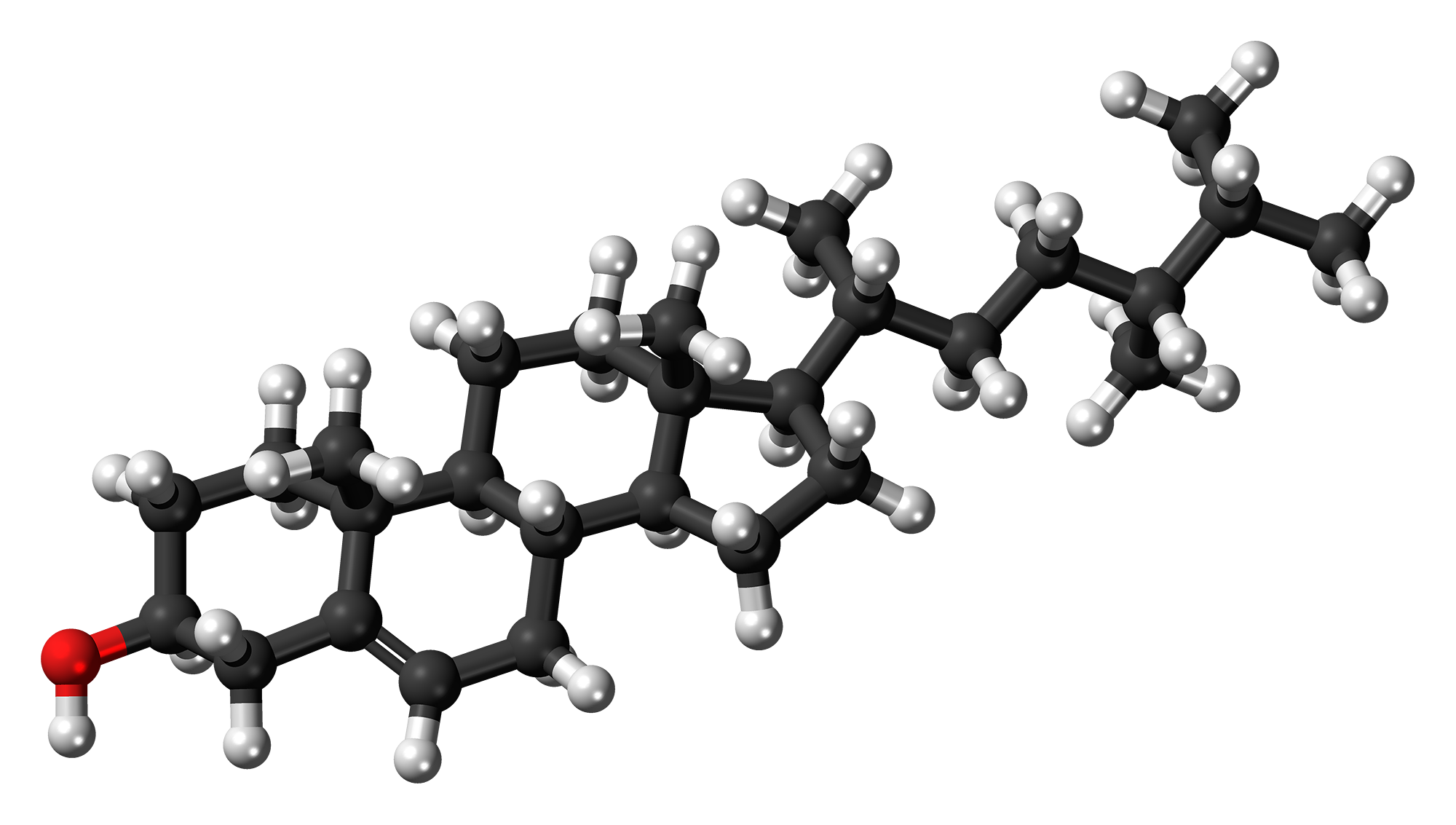

Names
- IUPAC name Campest-5-en-3β-ol
- Systematic IUPAC name (1R,3aS,3bS,7S,9aR,9bS,11aR)-1-[(2R,5R)-5,6-Dimethylheptan-2-yl]-9a,11a-dimethyl-2,3,3a,3b,4,6,7,8,9,9a,9b,10,11,11a-tetradecahydro-1H-cyclopenta[a]phenanthren-7-ol
- Other names (24R)-Ergost-5-en-3β-ol

Identifiers
| CAS Number | 474-62-4 |
| 3D model (JSmol) | Interactive image |
| ChEBI | CHEBI:28623 |
| ChEMBL | ChEMBL520535 |
| ChemSpider | 151215 |
| ECHA InfoCard | 100.006.806 |
| PubChem CID | 173183 |
| UNII | 5L5O665639 |
| CompTox Dashboard (EPA) | DTXSID801009891 DTXSID3040988, DTXSID801009891 |
- InChI: InChI=1S/C28H48O/c1-18(2)19(3)7-8-20(4)24-11-12-25-23-10-9-21-17-22(29)13-15-27(21,5)26(23)14-16-28(24,25)6/h9,18-20,22-26,29H,7-8,10-17H2,1-6H3/t19-,20-,22+,23+,24-,25+,26+,27+,28-/m1/s1 Key: SGNBVLSWZMBQTH-PODYLUTMSA-N; InChI=1/C28H48O/c1-18(2)19(3)7-8-20(4)24-11-12-25-23-10-9-21-17-22(29)13-15-27(21,5)26(23)14-16-28(24,25)6/h9,18-20,22-26,29H,7-8,10-17H2,1-6H3/t19-,20-,22+,23+,24-,25+,26+,27+,28-/m1/s1 Key: SGNBVLSWZMBQTH-PODYLUTMBW
- SMILES: O[C@@H]4C/C3=C/C[C@@H]1[C@H](CC[C@]2([C@H]1CC[C@@H]2[C@H](C)CC[C@@H](C)C(C)C)C)[C@@]3(C)CC4

Properties
| Chemical formula | C_{28}H_{48}O |
| Molar mass | 400.691 g·mol^{−1} |
- Except where otherwise noted, data are given for materials in their standard state (at 25 °C [77 °F], 100 kPa). verify (what is ?) Infobox references

Campesterol is a phytosterol whose chemical structure is similar to that of cholesterol, and is one of the ingredients for E number E499.

== Natural occurrences ==
Many vegetables, fruits, nuts, and seeds contain campesterol, but in low concentrations. Banana, pomegranate, pepper, coffee, grapefruit, cucumber, onion, oat, potato, and lemon grass (citronella) are few examples of common sources containing campesterol at roughly 1–7 mg/100 g of the edible portion. In contrast, canola and corn oils contain as much as 16–100 mg/100 g. Levels are variable and are influenced by geography and growing environment. In addition, different strains have different levels of plant sterols. A number of new genetic strains are currently being engineered with the goal of producing varieties high in campesterol and other plant sterols. It is also found in dandelion coffee.

It is so named because it was first isolated from the rapeseed (Brassica campestris).

== Precursor of anabolic steroid boldenone ==
Campesterol can serve as a precursor to a wide range of steroid hormones. This is because it has structural similarity to cholesterol. Anabolic steroids like testosterone and boldenone are among the compounds that can be biosynthesized from either cholesterol or phytosterols like campesterol through a process called steroidogenesis.

Boldenone undecylenate is commonly used in veterinary medicine to induce growth in cattle, but it is also one of the most commonly abused anabolic steroids in sports. This led to suspicions that some of the athletes that have tested positive on boldenone undecylenate did not actually abuse the hormone itself, but had increased levels because they consumed food rich in campesterol or similar phytosteroids.

== Effect on blood lipids ==
Plant sterols were first shown in the 1950s to lower LDLs and cholesterol. Since then, numerous studies have reported the lipid-lowering effects of dietary phytosterols, including campesterol.

In basic research, campesterol competes with cholesterol, thus reducing the absorption of cholesterol in the human intestine. Plant sterols may also act directly on intestinal cells and affect transporter proteins. In addition, an effect on the synthesis of cholesterol-transporting proteins may occur in the liver cells through processes including cholesterol esterification and lipoprotein assembly, cholesterol synthesis, and apolipoprotein (apo) B100-containing lipoprotein removal.

Serum levels of campesterol and the ratio of campesterol to cholesterol have been proposed as measures of cardiac risk. Some studies have suggested that higher levels predict lower cardiac risk. However, extremely high levels are thought to be indicative of higher risk, as indicated by genetic disorders, such as sitosterolemia.

Study results of serum levels have been conflicting. A 2012 meta-analysis found that no clear relationship exists between campesterol or sitosterol blood levels and risk of cardiovascular disease, and that perhaps previous studies have been confounded by other factors. For example, people who have a higher campesterol level related to a diet high in fruits and nuts may be consuming a Mediterranean-style diet, thus have lower risk because of other lipids or lifestyle factors.

== Adverse effects ==
=== Nutrient levels ===
Excessive supplementation with plant sterols may be associated with reductions in beta-carotene and lycopene levels. Excessive long-term consumption of plant sterols may have a deleterious effect on vitamin E, possibly leading to vitamin E deficiency.

=== Increased risk of disease ===
Excessive use of plant sterols has been associated with an increased risk of cardiovascular disease, and genetic conditions that cause extremely elevated levels of some phytosterols, such as sitosterol, are associated with higher risks of cardiovascular disease. However, this is an active area of debate, and no data suggest that modestly elevated levels of campesterol have a negative cardiac impact.
