= C56H42O12 =

The molecular formula C_{56}H_{42}O_{12} (molar mass: 906.92 g/mol, exact mass: 906.267627 u) may refer to:

- Flexuosol A
- Hopeaphenol
- Hopeahainol A
- Vitisin A (stilbenoid)
- Vitisin B (stilbenoid)
- Vitisin C, a stilbenoid
