= Viniferin =

Viniferin may refer to:

- α-Viniferin, a stilbine trimer
- β-Viniferin, a resveratrol cyclic tetramer
- δ-Viniferin, a resveratrol dehydrodimer
- ε-Viniferin, a resveratrol dimer
- γ-Viniferin, a more highly polymerised oligomer of resveratrol
- R-Viniferin, a synonym for the stilbenoid Vitisin B
- R2-Viniferin, a synonym for the stilbenoid Vitisin A
