= Δ-Viniferin =

δ-Viniferin

Names
- Preferred IUPAC name 5-[(2R,3R)-5-[(1E)-2-(3,5-Dihydroxyphenyl)ethen-1-yl]-2-(4-hydroxyphenyl)-2,3-dihydro-1-benzofuran-3-yl]benzene-1,3-diol
- Other names δ-Viniferin trans-δ-Viniferin; Resveratrol (E)-dehydrodimer; Maximol A

Identifiers
CAS Number	204076-78-8
3D model (JSmol)	Interactive image
ChEBI	CHEBI:76147
ChEMBL	ChEMBL4209546
ChemSpider	552752
PubChem CID	637098
- InChI: InChI=1S/C28H22O6/c29-20-6-4-18(5-7-20)28-27(19-12-23(32)15-24(33)13-19)25-11-16(3-8-26(25)34-28)1-2-17-9-21(30)14-22(31)10-17/h1-15,27-33H/b2-1+/t27-,28+/m1/s1 Key: LILPTCHQLRKZNG-CKKRXTSSSA-N
- SMILES: C1=CC(=CC=C1[C@H]2[C@@H](C3=C(O2)C=CC(=C3)/C=C/C4=CC(=CC(=C4)O)O)C5=CC(=CC(=C5)O)O)O

Properties
Chemical formula	C_{28}H_{22}O_{6}
Molar mass	454.47 g/mol
- Except where otherwise noted, data are given for materials in their standard state (at 25 °C [77 °F], 100 kPa). Infobox references

δ-Viniferin is a resveratrol dehydrodimer. It is an isomer of epsilon-viniferin. It can be isolated from stressed grapevine (Vitis vinifera) leaves. It is also found in plant cell cultures and wine. It can also be found in Rheum maximowiczii.

It is a grapevine phytoalexin following stresses like fungal infection (by Plasmopara viticola, the agent of downy mildew), UV light irradiation or ozone treatment.

Botryosphaeria obtusa, a pathogen responsible for the black dead arm disease of grapevine, has also been shown to be able to oxidise wood δ-resveratrol into delta-viniferin.

In cell cultures, the use of methyl jasmonate and jasmonic acid as elicitors stimulates δ-viniferin biosynthesis.

Delta-viniferin can also be produced from resveratrol by human PTGS1 (COX-1, cyclooxygenase-1) or from trans-resveratrol and (−)-epsilon-viniferin by horseradish peroxidase.

== See also ==
- Phenolic content in wine
- Viniferin (disambiguous)
- α-Viniferin
- ε-Viniferin
- R-Viniferin
- R2-Viniferin
