= Flexuosa =

Flexuosa, meaning "full of bends" in Latin, may refer to:

- Agonis flexuosa, a species of tree
- Deschampsia flexuosa, a species of bunchgrass
- Erysiphe flexuosa, a species of plant pathogen
- Grevillea flexuosa, a species of shrub
- Scutellastra flexuosa, a species of sea snail
- Vitis flexuosa, a species of liana in the grape family
- Xylosma flexuosa, a species of flowering plant in the willow family

== See also ==
- C. flexuosa (disambiguation)
- M. flexuosa (disambiguation)
