= Curly sedge =

Curly sedge is a common name for several plants and may refer to:

- Carex rupestris, native to Asia, Europe, and North America
- Carex fretalis, native to New Zealand
- Caustis recurvata, native to Australia
