= C. sinica =

C. sinica may refer to:

- Caenorhabditis sinica, a nematode species
- Caragana sinica, a plant species
- Carduelis sinica, the Oriental Greenfinch or Grey-capped Greenfinch, a small passerine bird species
