= Vitisin =

Vitisin may refer to the following substances:

- Vitisin A
- Vitisin B
- Vitisin C, a stilbenoid
