= Carasinol B =

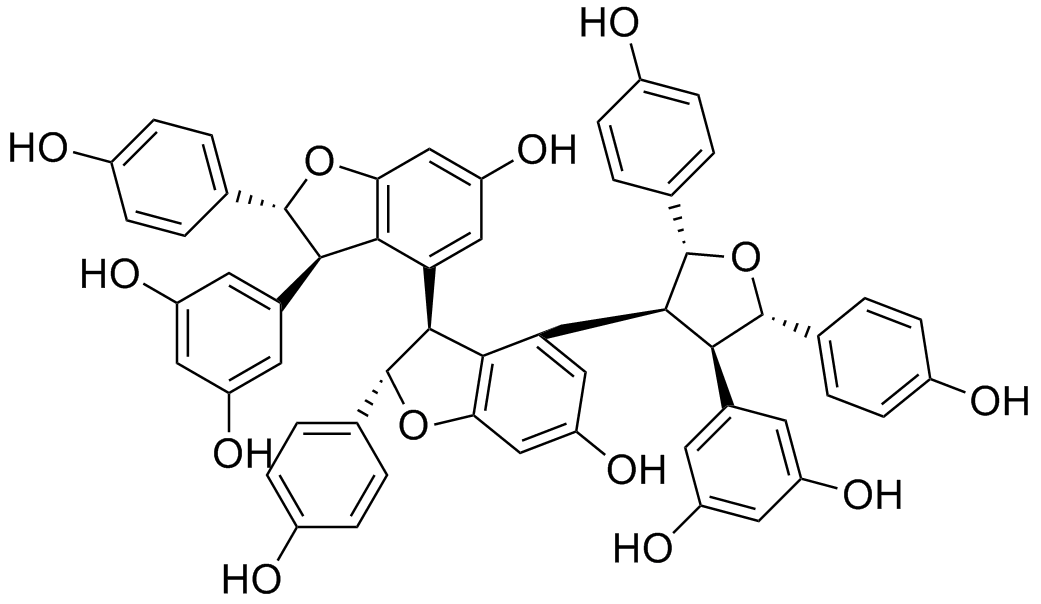

Names
- Preferred IUPAC name (2S,2′R,3S,3′R)-3′-(3,5-Dihydroxyphenyl)-4-[(2R,3S,4R,5S)-4-(3,5-dihydroxyphenyl)-2,5-bis(4-hydroxyphenyl)oxolan-3-yl]-2,2′-bis(hydroxyphenyl)-2,2′,3,3′-tetrahydro[3,4′-bi-1-benzoxole]-6,6′-diol

Identifiers
CAS Number	777857-86-0
3D model (JSmol)	Interactive image
ChemSpider	9484024
PubChem CID	11309056
CompTox Dashboard (EPA)	DTXSID80461832
- InChI: InChI=1S/C56H44O13/c57-33-9-1-27(2-10-33)53-47(31-17-37(61)21-38(62)18-31)49-43(23-41(65)25-45(49)67-53)52-50-44(24-42(66)26-46(50)68-55(52)29-5-13-35(59)14-6-29)51-48(32-19-39(63)22-40(64)20-32)54(28-3-11-34(58)12-4-28)69-56(51)30-7-15-36(60)16-8-30/h1-26,47-48,51-66H/t47-,48+,51-,52+,53+,54-,55-,56+/m1/s1 Key: RAUCCLKIJHMTND-HFRYPGABSA-N; InChI=1/C56H44O13/c57-33-9-1-27(2-10-33)53-47(31-17-37(61)21-38(62)18-31)49-43(23-41(65)25-45(49)67-53)52-50-44(24-42(66)26-46(50)68-55(52)29-5-13-35(59)14-6-29)51-48(32-19-39(63)22-40(64)20-32)54(28-3-11-34(58)12-4-28)69-56(51)30-7-15-36(60)16-8-30/h1-26,47-48,51-66H/t47-,48+,51-,52+,53+,54-,55-,56+/m1/s1 Key: RAUCCLKIJHMTND-HFRYPGABBW
- SMILES: Oc1ccc(cc1)[C@@H]4Oc2cc(O)cc(c2[C@H]4c3cc(O)cc(O)c3)[C@H]6c7c(O[C@@H]6c5ccc(O)cc5)cc(O)cc7[C@@H]%10[C@H](c8cc(O)cc(O)c8)[C@H](O[C@H]%10c9ccc(O)cc9)c%11ccc(O)cc%11

Properties
Chemical formula	C_{56}H_{44}O_{13}
Molar mass	924.94 g/mol
- Except where otherwise noted, data are given for materials in their standard state (at 25 °C [77 °F], 100 kPa). verify (what is ?) Infobox references

Carasinol B is a stilbenoid tetramer found in Caragana sinica (Chinese : Jin Que-gen).

Acid-catalyzed epimerization of kobophenol A to carasinol B can be performed in vitro.
