= C. flexuosa =

C. flexuosa may refer to:

- Cardamine flexuosa, a species of plant in the cabbage family
- Caustis flexuosa, a species of sedge
- Chrysallida flexuosa, an alternative name for Parthenina flexuosa, a species of sea snail
- Corydalis flexuosa, a species of flowering plant in the family Papaveraceae

== See also ==
- Flexuosa (disambiguation)
