= VPS52 =

Protein-coding gene in the species Homo sapiens

Identifiers
- Aliases: VPS52, ARE1, SAC2, SACM2L, dJ1033B10.5, GARP complex subunit, VPS52 subunit of GARP complex
- External IDs: OMIM: 603443; MGI: 1330304; GeneCards: VPS52

Gene location (Human)
Chr.	Chromosome 6 (human)
Band	6p21.32	Start	33,250,272 bp
Band	6p21.32	End	33,272,047 bp

Gene location (Mouse)
Chr.	Chromosome 17 (mouse)
Band	17|17 B1	Start	34,174,786 bp
Band	17|17 B1	End	34,186,009 bp
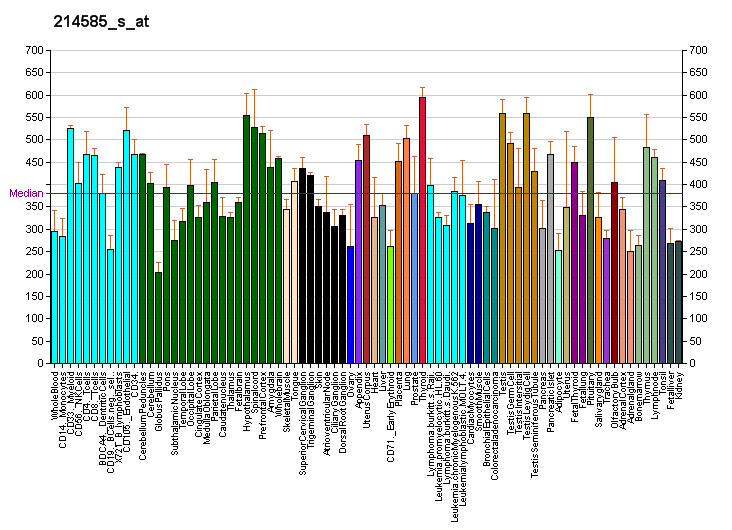
RNA expression pattern
Bgee	Human / Mouse (ortholog); Top expressed in: right lobe of thyroid gland; right uterine tube; pituitary gland; right adrenal cortex; left lobe of thyroid gland; right hemisphere of cerebellum; spleen; anterior pituitary; left adrenal cortex; right ovary / Top expressed in: granulocyte; superior frontal gyrus; primary visual cortex; muscle of thigh; lip; spermatocyte; neural layer of retina; dentate gyrus of hippocampal formation granule cell; right kidney; Ileal epithelium; More reference expression data
BioGPS	More reference expression data
Gene ontology
Molecular function	syntaxin binding; protein binding
Cellular component	perinuclear region of cytoplasm; recycling endosome; EARP complex; endosome; Golgi apparatus; endosome membrane; membrane; trans-Golgi network membrane; GARP complex; cytosol
Biological process	protein transport; ectodermal cell differentiation; embryonic ectodermal digestive tract development; endocytic recycling; lysosomal transport; Golgi to vacuole transport; retrograde transport, endosome to Golgi
Sources:Amigo / QuickGO
Orthologs
Databases	NCBI: entry; OMA: entry
Species	Human	Mouse
Entrez	6293	224705
Ensembl	ENSG00000236014; ENSG00000206286; ENSG00000223501; ENSG00000224455; ENSG00000225590 ENSG00000223618; ENSG00000228425	ENSMUSG00000024319
UniProt	Q8N1B4	Q8C754
RefSeq (mRNA)	NM_001289174; NM_001289175; NM_001289176; NM_022553	NM_172620; NM_001357329; NM_001357330; NM_001379410; NM_001379411
RefSeq (protein)	NP_001276103; NP_001276104; NP_001276105; NP_072047	NP_766208; NP_001344258; NP_001344259; NP_001366339; NP_001366340
Location (UCSC)	Chr 6: 33.25 – 33.27 Mb	Chr 17: 34.17 – 34.19 Mb
PubMed search
- Wikidata
View/Edit Human	View/Edit Mouse

Vacuolar protein sorting-associated protein 52 homolog is a protein that in humans is encoded by the VPS52 gene.

This gene encodes a protein that is similar to the yeast suppressor of actin mutations 2 gene. The yeast protein forms a subunit of the tetrameric Golgi-associated retrograde protein complex that is involved in vesicle trafficking from both early and late endosomes, back to the trans-Golgi network. This gene is located on chromosome 6 in a head-to-head orientation with the gene encoding ribosomal protein S18.
