= Vitisin A =

Vitisin A may refer to:

- Vitisin A (pyranoanthocyanin)
- Vitisin A (stilbenoid)

== See also ==
- Vitisin
