= Flexuosol A =

- Chemical structure of flexuosol A

Names
- Preferred IUPAC name 5-[(2R,3R)-4-{(2S,3S,5R,6R)-5-(3,5-Dihydroxyphenyl)-2,6-bis(4-hydroxyphenyl)-4-[(E)-2-(4-hydroxyphenyl)ethen-1-yl]-2,3,5,6-tetrahydro(benzo[1,2-b:5,4-b′]difuran)-3-yl}-2-(4-hydroxyphenyl)-2,3-dihydro-1-benzofuran-3-yl]benzene-1,3-diol

Identifiers
CAS Number	205440-11-5
3D model (JSmol)	Interactive image
ChemSpider	57539156
PubChem CID	71308201
UNII	8256ST4BZK
CompTox Dashboard (EPA)	DTXSID30745437
- InChI: InChI=1S/C56H42O11/c57-35-13-4-29(5-14-35)6-21-44-51-46(66-55(31-9-17-37(59)18-10-31)49(51)34-24-41(63)27-42(64)25-34)28-47-52(44)53(56(67-47)32-11-19-38(60)20-12-32)43-2-1-3-45-50(43)48(33-22-39(61)26-40(62)23-33)54(65-45)30-7-15-36(58)16-8-30/h1-28,48-49,53-64H/b21-6+/t48-,49-,53+,54+,55+,56-/m1/s1 Key: AZTITUGYPXKUCV-CGOOCLRTSA-N
- SMILES: OC1=CC([C@H]2[C@H](C3=CC=C(O)C=C3)OC4=CC5=C([C@@](C6=CC=CC7=C6[C@@H](C8=CC(O)=CC(O)=C8)[C@H](C9=CC=C(O)C=C9)O7)([H])[C@@H](C%10=CC=C(O)C=C%10)O5)C(/C=C/C%11=CC=C(O)C=C%11)=C42)=CC(O)=C1

Properties
Chemical formula	C_{56}H_{42}O_{12}
Molar mass	906.940 g·mol^{−1}
- Except where otherwise noted, data are given for materials in their standard state (at 25 °C [77 °F], 100 kPa). Infobox references

Flexuosol A is a resveratrol tetramer found in Vitis flexuosa.
