= Caustis gigas =

Giant twig-rush

Conservation status
- Priority Two — Poorly Known Taxa (DEC)

Scientific classification
- Kingdom: Plantae
- Clade: Tracheophytes
- Clade: Angiosperms
- Clade: Monocots
- Clade: Commelinids
- Order: Poales
- Family: Cyperaceae
- Genus: Caustis
- Species: C. gigas

Binomial name
- Caustis gigas R.L.Barrett

Species of grass-like plant

Caustis gigas, commonly known as giant twig-rush, is a sedge that is native to Western Australia.

The rhizomatous perennial sedge has a robust habit and typically grows to a height of 2 metres (6.6 ft). The plant blooms between April and May producing brown flowers.

It is found in the Wheatbelt region between Chittering and Coorow where it grows in sandy soils.
