= Caustis deserti =

Desert twig-rush

Conservation status
- Priority Three — Poorly Known Taxa (DEC)

Scientific classification
- Kingdom: Plantae
- Clade: Tracheophytes
- Clade: Angiosperms
- Clade: Monocots
- Clade: Commelinids
- Order: Poales
- Family: Cyperaceae
- Genus: Caustis
- Species: C. deserti

Binomial name
- Caustis deserti R.L.Barrett

Species of grass-like plant

Caustis deserti, commonly known as desert twig-rush, is a sedge that is native to a small area in the Goldfields-Esperance region of Western Australia to the east of Kalgoorlie.
