= Foeniculoside I =

- Chemical structure of foeniculoside I

Names
- IUPAC name 3-{(2S,2′R,3S,3′R)-6,6′-Dihydroxy-2,2′-bis(4-hydroxyphenyl)-4-[(E)-2-(4-hydroxyphenyl)ethen-1-yl]-2,2′,3,3′-tetrahydro[3,4′-bi-1-benzofuran]-3′-yl}-5-hydroxyphenyl β-D-glucopyranoside
- Systematic IUPAC name (1^{2}S,1^{3}R,1^{4}S,1^{5}S,1^{6}R,4^{2}R,4^{3}R,5^{2}S,5^{3}S,6E)-1^{6}-(Hydroxymethyl)-4^{2},5^{2}-bis(4-hydroxyphenyl)-4^{2},4^{3},5^{2},5^{3}-tetrahydro-4,5(3,4)-bis([1]benzofurana)-1(2)-oxana-3(1,3),8(1)-dibenzenaoctaphan-6-ene-1^{3},1^{4},1^{5},3^{5},4^{6},5^{6},8^{4}-heptol
- Other names cis-Miyabenol C 11a-O-β-D-glucopyranoside

Identifiers
| CAS Number | 168010-10-4 |
| 3D model (JSmol) | Interactive image |
| PubChem CID | 101924276 |
- InChI: InChI=1S/C48H42O14/c49-22-38-43(56)44(57)45(58)48(62-38)59-34-17-27(16-31(53)18-34)40-41-35(19-33(55)21-37(41)61-46(40)24-5-11-29(51)12-6-24)42-39-26(4-1-23-2-9-28(50)10-3-23)15-32(54)20-36(39)60-47(42)25-7-13-30(52)14-8-25/h1-21,38,40,42-58H,22H2/b4-1+/t38-,40-,42+,43-,44+,45-,46+,47-,48-/m1/s1 Key: SZKVNSODIJRAET-AKFYMKAISA-N
- SMILES: OCC1OC(OC2=CC(=CC(O)=C2)C2C(OC3=CC(O)=CC(C4C(OC5=C4C(\C=C\C4=CC=C(O)C=C4)=CC(O)=C5)C4=CC=C(O)C=C4)=C23)C2=CC=C(O)C=C2)C(O)C(O)C1O

Properties
| Chemical formula | C_{48}H_{42}O_{14} |
| Molar mass | 842.850 g·mol^{−1} |
- Except where otherwise noted, data are given for materials in their standard state (at 25 °C [77 °F], 100 kPa). Infobox references

Foeniculoside I is a stilbenoid. It is a glucoside of the stilbene trimer cis-miyabenol C. It can be found in Foeniculi fructus (fruit of Foeniculum vulgare).
