= Vitisin B =

Vitisin B may refer to:

- Vitisin B (pyranoanthocyanin)
- Vitisin B (stilbenoid)

== See also ==
- Vitisin
