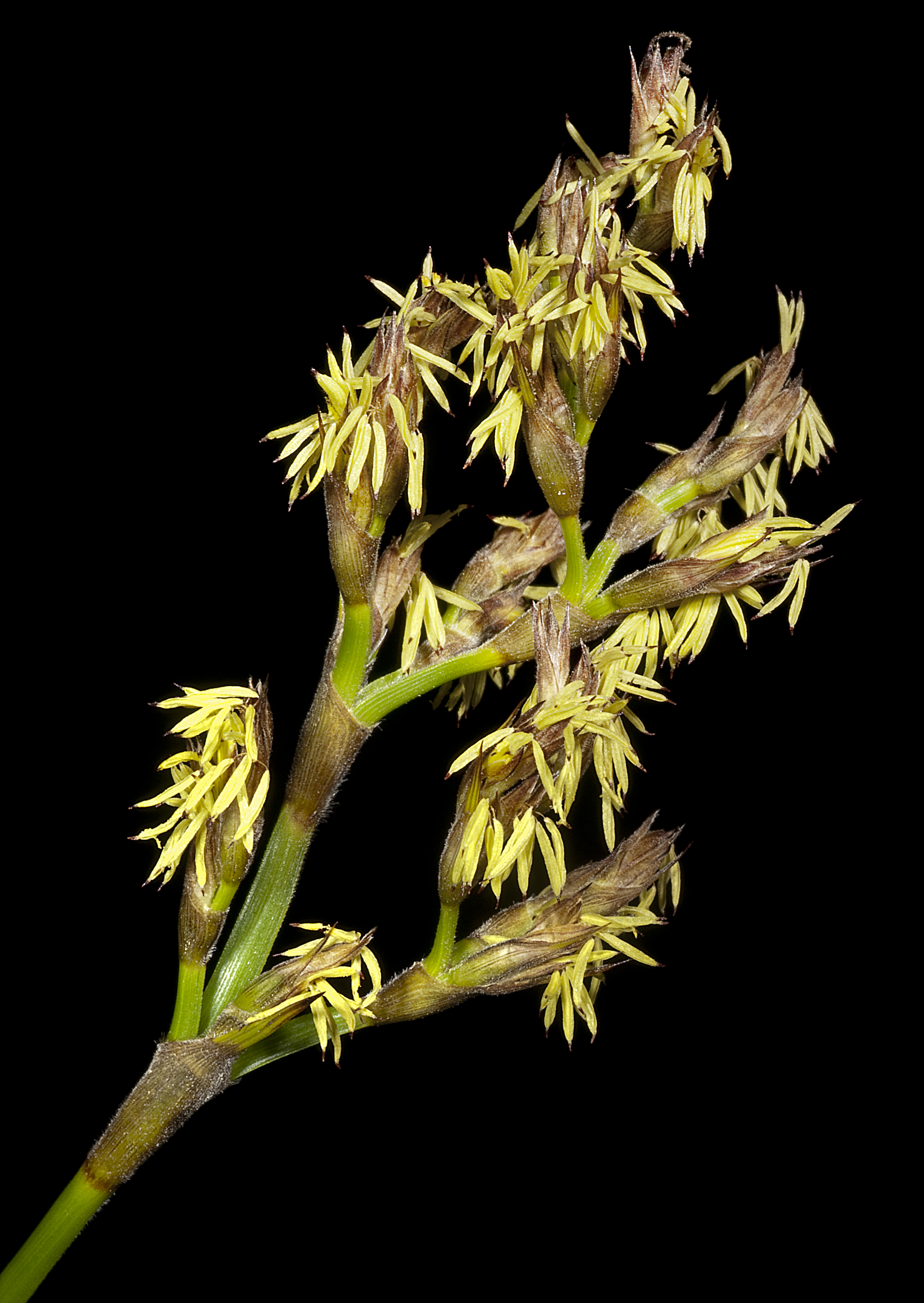
- Male

Scientific classification
- Kingdom: Plantae
- Clade: Tracheophytes
- Clade: Angiosperms
- Clade: Monocots
- Clade: Commelinids
- Order: Poales
- Family: Cyperaceae
- Genus: Caustis
- Species: C. dioica

Binomial name
- Caustis dioica R.Br.

= Caustis dioica =

Species of grass-like plant

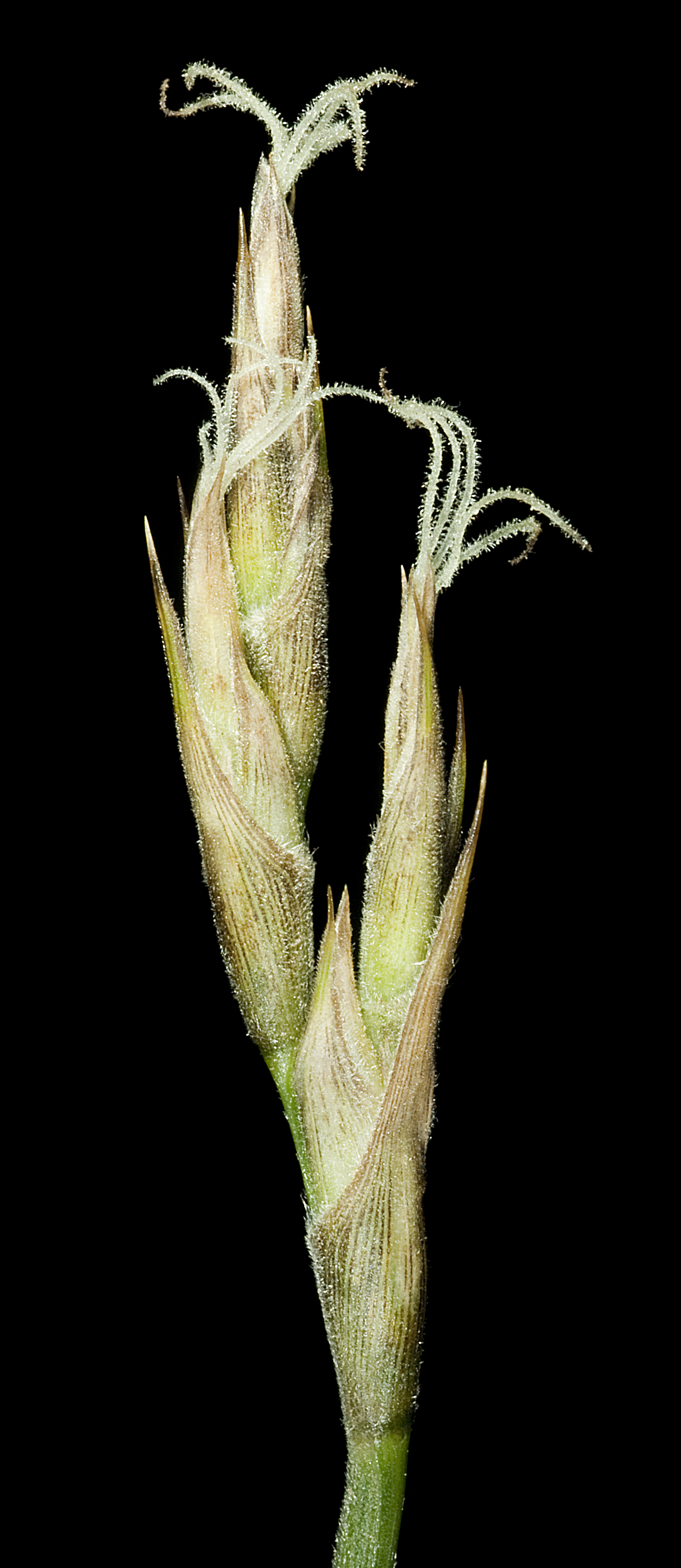
Female

Caustis dioica is a sedge that is native to Western Australia.

The monoecious and rhizomatous perennial sedge has a tangled, tussocky habit. It typically grows to a height of 15 to 70 centimetres (6 to 28 in) and a width of 50 centimetres (20 in) and has pungent smelling leaves. The plant blooms between September and December producing yellow-brown flowers.

It is found in the Mid West, Wheatbelt, South West, Great Southern and Goldfields-Esperance regions where it grows in sandy-loamy soils.
