= Miyabenol C =

Names
- Preferred IUPAC name (2S,2′R,3S,3′R)-3′-(3,5-Dihydroxyphenyl)-2,2′-bis(4-hydroxyphenyl)-4-[(E)-2-(4-hydroxyphenyl)ethen-1-yl]-2,2′,3,3′-tetrahydro[3,5′-bi-1-benzofuran]-6,7′-diol
- Other names Z-miyabenol C (E)-cis-miyabenol C

Identifiers
CAS Number	109605-83-6
3D model (JSmol)	Interactive image
ChEBI	CHEBI:76193
ChemSpider	4977560
PubChem CID	5388319
UNII	78H44UGJ85
CompTox Dashboard (EPA)	DTXSID20745441
- InChI: InChI=1S/C42H32O9/c43-27-9-2-22(3-10-27)1-4-25-15-32(48)20-35-37(25)40(42(50-35)24-7-13-29(45)14-8-24)34-19-33(49)21-36-39(34)38(26-16-30(46)18-31(47)17-26)41(51-36)23-5-11-28(44)12-6-23/h1-21,38,40-49H/b4-1+/t38-,40+,41+,42-/m1/s1 Key: RKFYYCKIHVEWHX-YOBICRQBSA-N
- SMILES: c1cc(ccc1/C=C/c2cc(cc3c2[C@@H]([C@H](O3)c4ccc(cc4)O)c5cc(cc6c5[C@H]([C@@H](O6)c7ccc(cc7)O)c8cc(cc(c8)O)O)O)O)O

Properties
Chemical formula	C_{42}H_{32}O_{9}
Molar mass	680.709 g·mol^{−1}
- Except where otherwise noted, data are given for materials in their standard state (at 25 °C [77 °F], 100 kPa). Infobox references

Miyabenol C is a stilbenoid. It is a resveratrol trimer. It is found in Vitis vinifera (grape), in Foeniculi fructus (fruit of Foeniculum vulgare), in Caragana sinica.

It shows protein kinase C inhibitor activity.

Foeniculoside I is a glucoside of cis-miyabenol C.
