= Caustis blakei =

Koala fern

Scientific classification
- Kingdom: Plantae
- Clade: Tracheophytes
- Clade: Angiosperms
- Clade: Monocots
- Clade: Commelinids
- Order: Poales
- Family: Cyperaceae
- Genus: Caustis
- Species: C. blakei

Binomial name
- Caustis blakei Kük. ex S.T.Blake

Species of plant in the sedge family

Caustis blakei, also known as the koala fern, is a species of rhizomatous sedge in the family Cyperaceae. It is found exclusively in Australia in southeastern Queensland and northeastern New South Wales. It has rigid, smooth stems up to 2 metres (6 ft 7 in) with 10 to 28 nodes. It has two subspecies: C. blakei subsp. blakei and C. blakei subsp. macrantha, which was identified by Johnston et al. in 1997. The two subspecies differ in length of spikelets, anthers, and fruit.

== Habitat ==
Caustis blakei is found in tall eucalyptus forests with sparse or closed canopies in sandy soils or soils derived from weathered sandstone. C. blakei subsp. blakei occurs in mainland Australia from Toolara in Queensland to Crowdy Bay National Park in New South Wales, with additional populations identified on Fraser Island, Moreton Island, and Stradbroke Island. Geographically isolated, inland populations of C. blakei subsp. macrantha have been identified in Murphys Creek, Esk, and Helidon.

== Description ==
Caustis blakei is a slow-growing plant that has adapted to acidic, sandy soils that have high levels of iron and low levels of phosphorus. As a result, it is capable of inducing dauciform roots as a morphological response to growing in soil that is deficient of these essential minerals. These roots function similarly to cluster roots in exuding phosphatases and carboxylates to aid in chemically mobilizing scarce soil nutrients.

== Threats ==
Although C. blakei subsp. blakei is common in coastal areas, including land protected as national parks and World Heritage Sites areas, there is no government protection for the inland areas where C. blakei subsp. macrantha is found. C. blakei subsp. macrantha is also under greater pressure from urban development, bushfires due to lower rainfall in inland areas that increases fire risk while lowering growth rates, and harvesting for export.

Fresh and dried stems of Caustis blakei are exported from Australia to Europe, Japan, and the US, as well as domestically in Australia. Over one million stems are exported annually. These are harvested from natural populations because commercial propagation of Caustis blakei is not possible. Because much of the land where populations of C. blakei subsp. blakei are found is protected, bush-harvesting is most common in the inland populations of C. blakei subsp. macrantha. Efforts to domesticate Caustis blakei for commercial export have been ongoing since 1996.
