= M. flexuosa =

M. flexuosa may refer to:

- Macrozamia flexuosa, a species of plant in the family Zamiaceae
- Mauritia flexuosa, a species of palm tree

== See also ==
- Flexuosa (disambiguation)
