= Hopeaphenol =

- Chemical structure of hopeaphenol

Names
- Other names (-)-hopeaphenol

Identifiers
CAS Number	17912-85-5
3D model (JSmol)	Interactive image
ChEMBL	ChEMBL1082601
ChemSpider	10277817
PubChem CID	495605
UNII	8K2E6922LC
CompTox Dashboard (EPA)	DTXSID801029736
- InChI: InChI=1S/C56H42O12/c57-29-9-1-25(2-10-29)45-47-37(17-33(61)21-41(47)65)53-49-39(19-35(63)23-43(49)67-55(53)27-5-13-31(59)14-6-27)51(45)52-40-20-36(64)24-44-50(40)54(56(68-44)28-7-15-32(60)16-8-28)38-18-34(62)22-42(66)48(38)46(52)26-3-11-30(58)12-4-26/h1-24,45-46,51-66H/t45-,46-,51-,52-,53-,54-,55+,56+/m0/s1 Key: YQQUILZPDYJDQJ-QWJFNKQSSA-N; InChI=1/C56H42O12/c57-29-9-1-25(2-10-29)45-47-37(17-33(61)21-41(47)65)53-49-39(19-35(63)23-43(49)67-55(53)27-5-13-31(59)14-6-27)51(45)52-40-20-36(64)24-44-50(40)54(56(68-44)28-7-15-32(60)16-8-28)38-18-34(62)22-42(66)48(38)46(52)26-3-11-30(58)12-4-26/h1-24,45-46,51-66H/t45-,46-,51-,52-,53-,54-,55+,56+/m0/s1 Key: YQQUILZPDYJDQJ-QWJFNKQSBW
- SMILES: OC(C=C1)=CC=C1[C@@H]2OC3=CC(O)=CC4=C3[C@@]2([H])C(C=C(O)C=C5O)=C5[C@@H](C6=CC=C(O)C=C6)[C@]4([H])[C@@]7([H])[C@H](C8=CC=C(O)C=C8)C9=C(C=C(O)C=C9O)[C@]%10([H])C%11=C7C=C(O)C=C%11O[C@H]%10C%12=CC=C(O)C=C%12

Properties
Chemical formula	C_{56}H_{42}O_{12}
Molar mass	906.940 g·mol^{−1}
- Except where otherwise noted, data are given for materials in their standard state (at 25 °C [77 °F], 100 kPa). verify (what is ?) Infobox references

Hopeaphenol is a stilbenoid. It is a resveratrol tetramer. It has been first isolated from Dipterocarpaceae like Shorea ovalis. It has also been isolated from wines from North Africa.

It shows an opposite effect to vitisin A on apoptosis of myocytes isolated from adult rat heart.

== See also ==
- Phenolic compounds in wine
