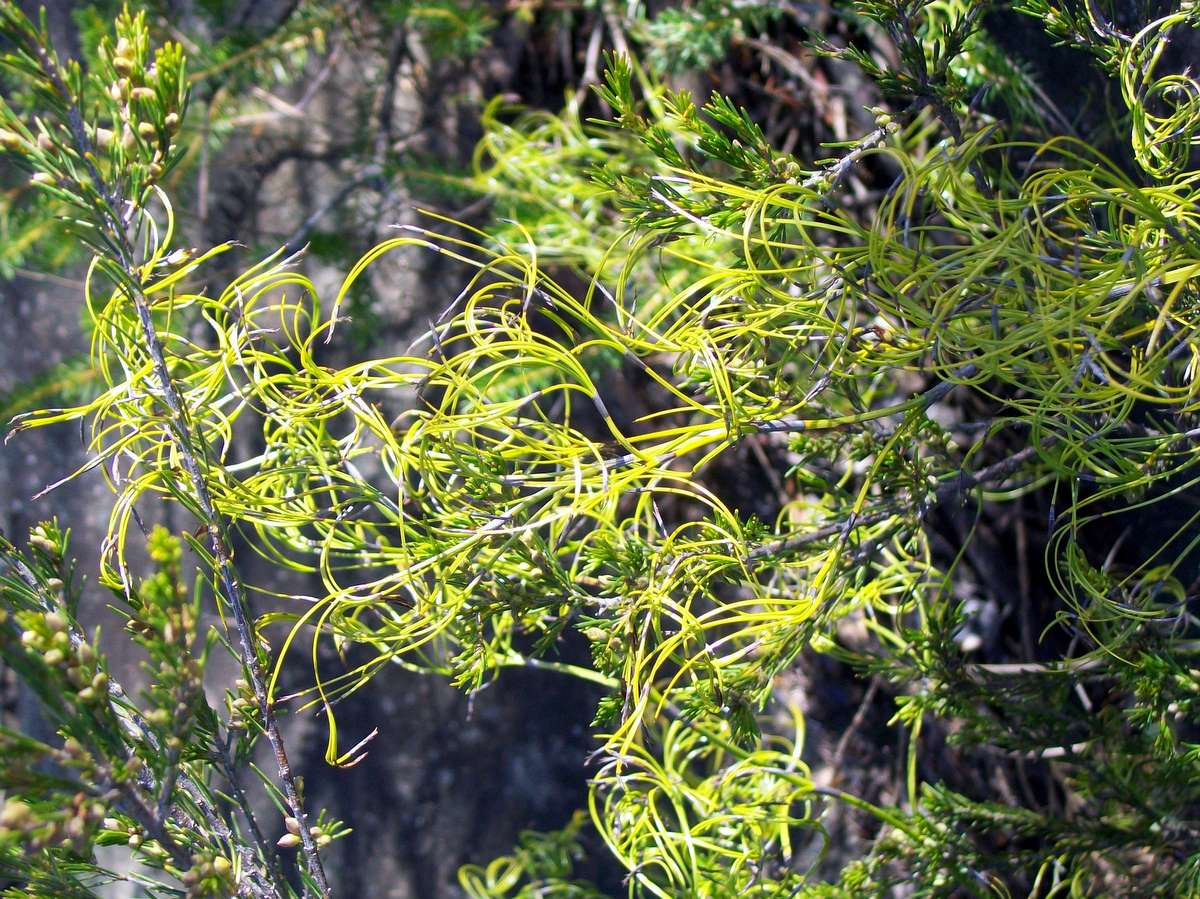
- Caustis flexuosa

Scientific classification
- Kingdom: Plantae
- Clade: Tracheophytes
- Clade: Angiosperms
- Clade: Monocots
- Clade: Commelinids
- Order: Poales
- Family: Cyperaceae
- Genus: Caustis; R.Br.

= Caustis =

Genus of grass-like plants

Caustis is a genus of rhizomatous flowering plants in the sedge family.

== Species ==
The species, all endemic to Australia, are as follows:

- Caustis blakei Kuk.
- Caustis deserti R.L.Barrett
- Caustis dioica R.Br.
- Caustis flexuosa R.Br. - Curly Wig
- Caustis gigas R.L.Barrett
- Caustis pentandra R.Br. -Thick Twist Rush
- Caustis recurvata Spreng.
- Caustis restiacea Benth.
