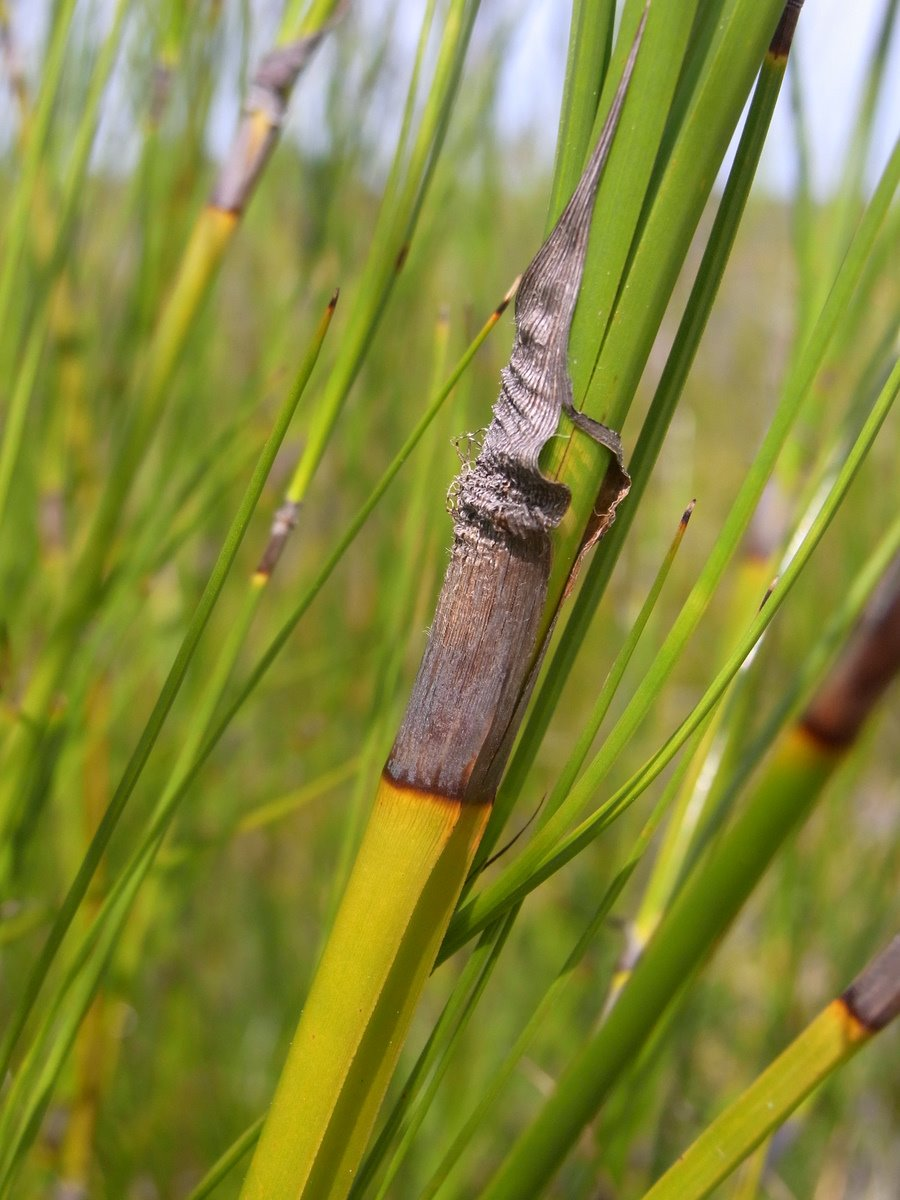
- Ku-ring-gai Chase National Park, Australia

Scientific classification
- Kingdom: Plantae
- Clade: Embryophytes
- Clade: Tracheophytes
- Clade: Angiosperms
- Clade: Monocots
- Clade: Commelinids
- Order: Poales
- Family: Cyperaceae
- Genus: Caustis
- Species: C. pentandra

Binomial name
- Caustis pentandra R.Br.

= Caustis pentandra =

Thick twist rush

Species of plant

Caustis pentandra, known as the thick twist rush is a widely distributed sedge found in many parts of Australia. It may grow to 2 metres tall, often seen in dry open forest, or moist heathland. Stems are a shiny pale green. The specific epithet pentandra is derived from the ancient Greek language, referring to five stamens. This species first appeared in scientific literature in the year 1810, in the Prodromus Florae Novae Hollandiae, authored by the prolific Scottish botanist Robert Brown.
