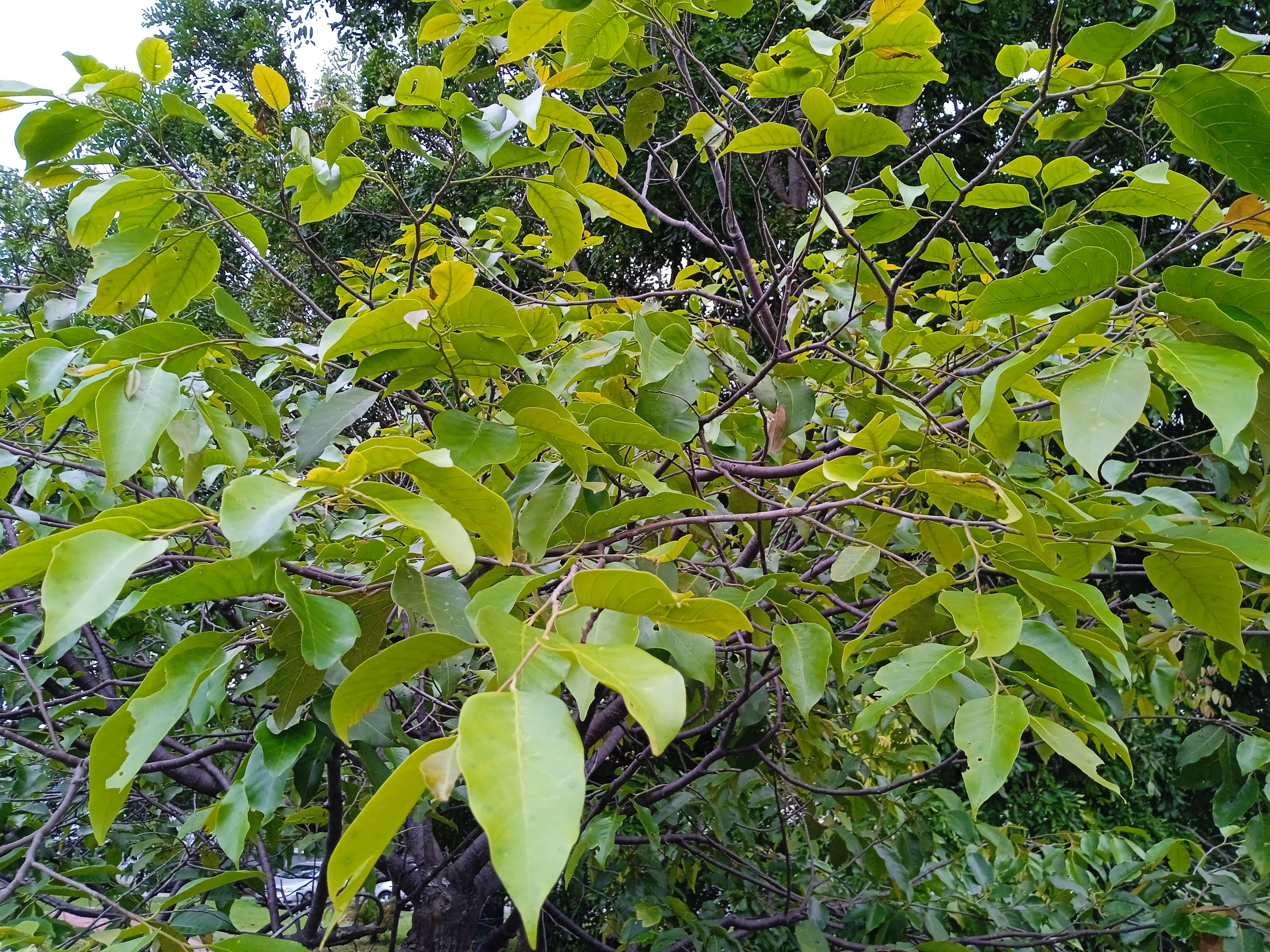

Conservation status
- Endangered (IUCN 3.1)

Scientific classification
- Kingdom: Plantae
- Clade: Tracheophytes
- Clade: Angiosperms
- Clade: Eudicots
- Clade: Rosids
- Order: Malvales
- Family: Dipterocarpaceae
- Genus: Hopea
- Species: H. hainanensis

Binomial name
- Hopea hainanensis Merr. & Chun

= Hopea hainanensis =

Species of tree

Hopea hainanensis is a species of tree in the family Dipterocarpaceae. It is found in Hainan Island of China and northern Vietnam. Hopea hainanensis produces the acetylcholinesterase inhibitor Hopeahainol A.
