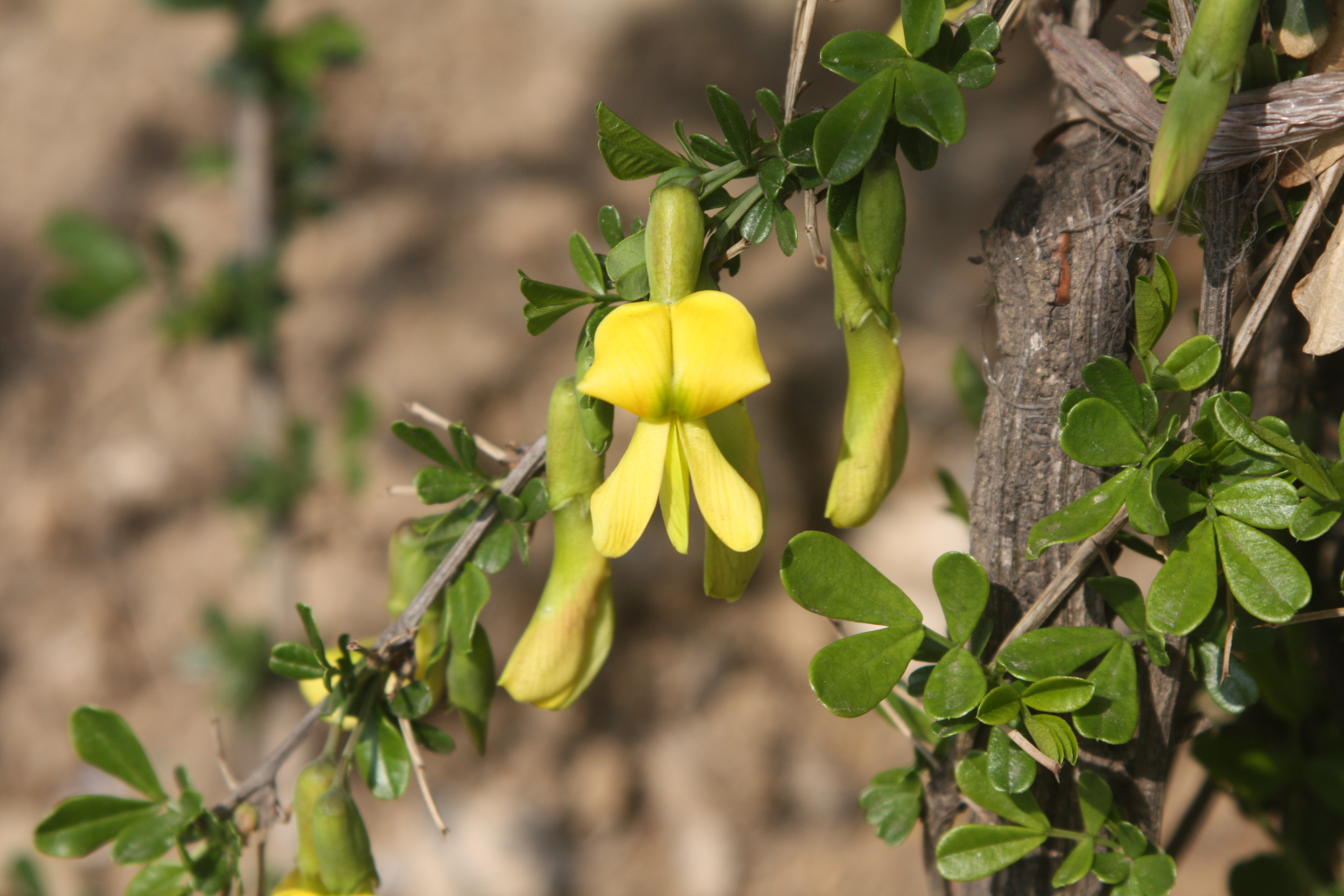

Scientific classification
- Kingdom: Plantae
- Clade: Tracheophytes
- Clade: Angiosperms
- Clade: Eudicots
- Clade: Rosids
- Order: Fabales
- Family: Fabaceae
- Subfamily: Faboideae
- Genus: Caragana
- Species: C. sinica

Binomial name
- Caragana sinica (Buc'hoz) Rehder

= Caragana sinica =

Species of legume

Caragana sinica (simplified Chinese: 金鹊根; traditional Chinese: 金鵲根; pinyin: jīnquègēn) is a species belonging to the genus Caragana.

Caragana sinica is known to produce the stilbenoid trimers α-viniferin, showing acetylcholinesterase inhibitory activity, and miyabenol C, a protein kinase C inhibitor and two stilbene tetramers kobophenol A, and carasinol B.
