= Hopeahainol A =

- Half of dimeric molecule

Names
- IUPAC name (1R,8R,9S,16R)-8,16-Bis(4-hydroxyphenyl)-9-[(1R,8S,9R,16R)-4,6,12-trihydroxy-8,16-bis(4-hydroxyphenyl)-15-oxatetracyclo[8.6.1.02,7.014,17]heptadeca-2(7),3,5,10(17),11,13-hexaen-9-yl]-15-oxatetracyclo[8.6.1.02,7.014,17]heptadeca-2(7),3,5,10(17),11,13-hexaene-4,6,12-triol

Identifiers
CAS Number	17912-85-5
3D model (JSmol)	Interactive image
ChEMBL	ChEMBL504634
ChemSpider	553431
PubChem CID	637848
UNII	8K2E6922LC
- InChI: InChI=1S/C56H42O12/c57-29-9-1-25(2-10-29)45-47-37(17-33(61)21-41(47)65)53-49-39(19-35(63)23-43(49)67-55(53)27-5-13-31(59)14-6-27)51(45)52-40-20-36(64)24-44-50(40)54(56(68-44)28-7-15-32(60)16-8-28)38-18-34(62)22-42(66)48(38)46(52)26-3-11-30(58)12-4-26/h1-24,45-46,51-66H/t45-,46+,51-,52+,53-,54-,55+,56+/m1/s1 Key: YQQUILZPDYJDQJ-VHXTUJGLSA-N
- SMILES: C1=CC(=CC=C1[C@@H]2[C@H](C3=C4[C@H]([C@@H](OC4=CC(=C3)O)C5=CC=C(C=C5)O)C6=C2C(=CC(=C6)O)O)[C@H]7[C@@H](C8=C(C=C(C=C8O)O)[C@H]9[C@@H](OC1=CC(=CC7=C91)O)C1=CC=C(C=C1)O)C1=CC=C(C=C1)O)O

Properties
Chemical formula	C_{56}H_{42}O_{12}
Molar mass	906.940 g·mol^{−1}
- Except where otherwise noted, data are given for materials in their standard state (at 25 °C [77 °F], 100 kPa). Infobox references

Hopeahainol A is a polyphenol acetylcholinesterase inhibitor with the molecular formula C_{56}H_{42}O_{12}. Hopeahainol A has been isolated from the tree Hopea hainanensis. Hopeahainol A may be used for the treatment of Alzheimer's disease.
