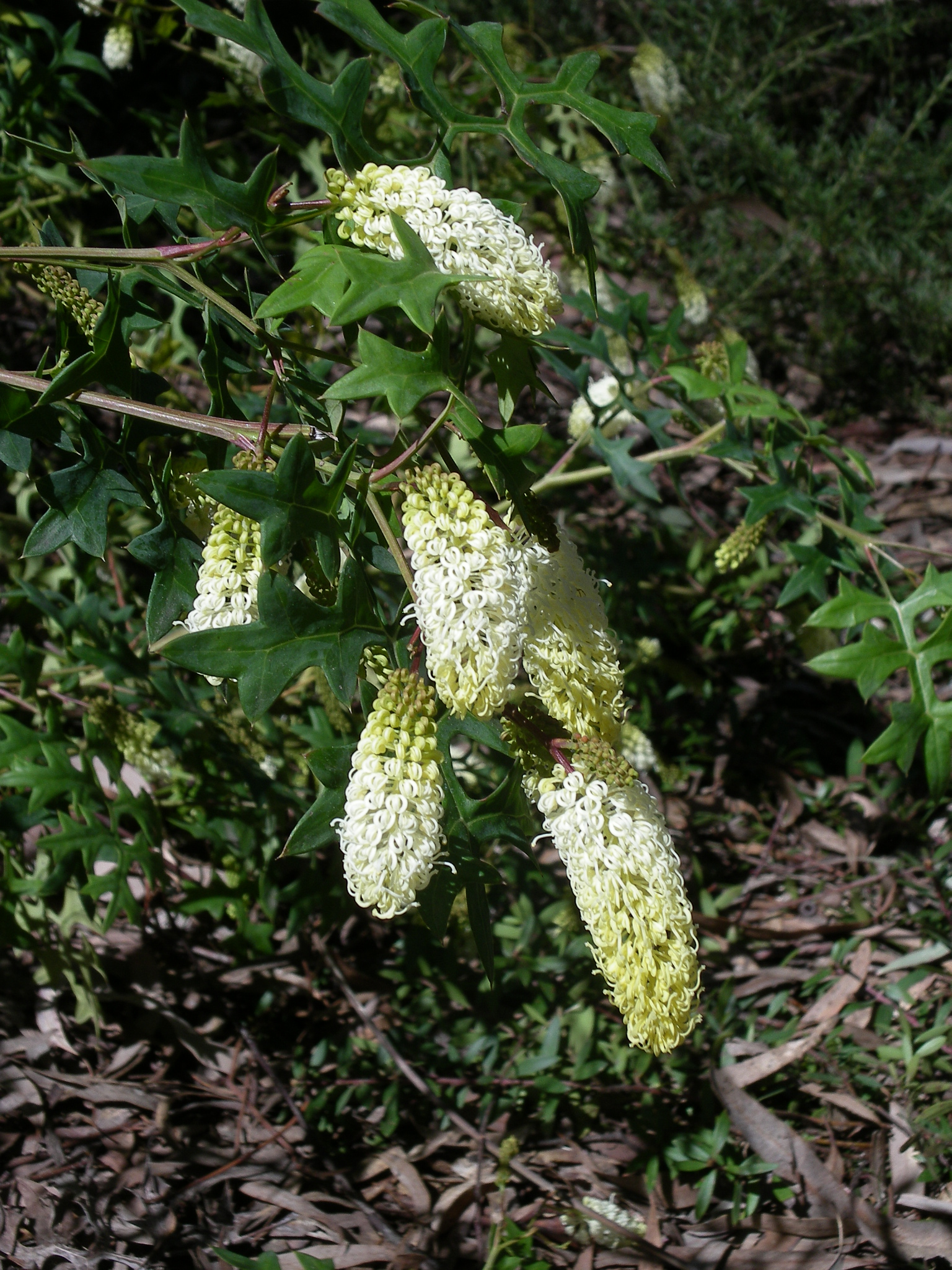

Conservation status
- Vulnerable (EPBC Act)

Scientific classification
- Kingdom: Plantae
- Clade: Embryophytes
- Clade: Tracheophytes
- Clade: Spermatophytes
- Clade: Angiosperms
- Clade: Eudicots
- Order: Proteales
- Family: Proteaceae
- Genus: Grevillea
- Species: G. flexuosa

Binomial name
- Grevillea flexuosa (Lindl.) Meisn.

Synonyms
- Anadenia flexuosa Lindl.; Grevillea flexuosa (Lindl.) Meisn. var. flexuosa

= Grevillea flexuosa =

Zigzag grevillea

Species of shrub endemic to Western Australia

Grevillea flexuosa, commonly known as zigzag grevillea or tangled grevillea, is a species of flowering plant in the family Proteaceae and is endemic to the south-west of Western Australia. It is an erect shrub with divided leaves, these lobes with three to five triangular lobes, and cylindrical clusters of cream-coloured to pale yellow flowers.

== Description ==
Grevillea flexuosa is an erect shrub that typically grows to a height of 1.5–2.0 m (4 ft 11 in – 6 ft 7 in) and has glabrous branchlets. Its leaves are deeply divided, 150–260 mm (5.9–10.2 in) long and 100–160 mm (3.9–6.3 in) wide with seven to eighteen lobes, each with three to five triangular lobes 5–30 mm (0.20–1.18 in) long and 5–10 mm (0.20–0.39 in) wide. The leaves on flowering branches are shorter and narrower. The edges of the leaf lobes curve downwards and both surfaces are glabrous. The flowers are arranged in leaf axils or on the ends of branches in sometimes branched, cylindrical racemes or candle-like clusters on a rachis 35–65 mm (1.4–2.6 in) long. The flowers are cream-coloured to pale yellow, the pistil 5.0–8.5 mm (0.20–0.33 in) long. Flowering occurs from July to October and the fruit is an oval follicle about 20 mm (0.79 in) long.

== Taxonomy ==
This species was first formally described in 1839 by John Lindley who gave it the name Anadenia flexousa in his A Sketch of the Vegetation of the Swan River Colony. Lindley referred to it there as "a singular species, allied to A. pulchella, with most curious zigzag leaves". In 1845, Anadenia was demoted to a section of Grevillea by Carl Meissner, and this species was thus transferred to Grevillea as Grevillea flexuosa (Lindl.) Meisn.. The specific epithet (flexuosa) means "zig-zag", referring to the leaf lobes.

== Distribution and habitat ==
Grevillea flexuosa is only known from a few locations near Toodyay and Stoneville where it grows in heath on hilltops, on slopes and in gullies, in the Jarrah Forest biogeographic region of south-western Western Australia.

== Conservation status ==
Zigzag grevillea is listed as vulnerable under the Australian Government Environment Protection and Biodiversity Conservation Act 1999 and as threatened by the Western Australian Government Department of Biodiversity, Conservation and Attractions. The main threats to the species include dieback caused by Phytophthora cinnamomi, land clearing, grazing and weed invasion.
