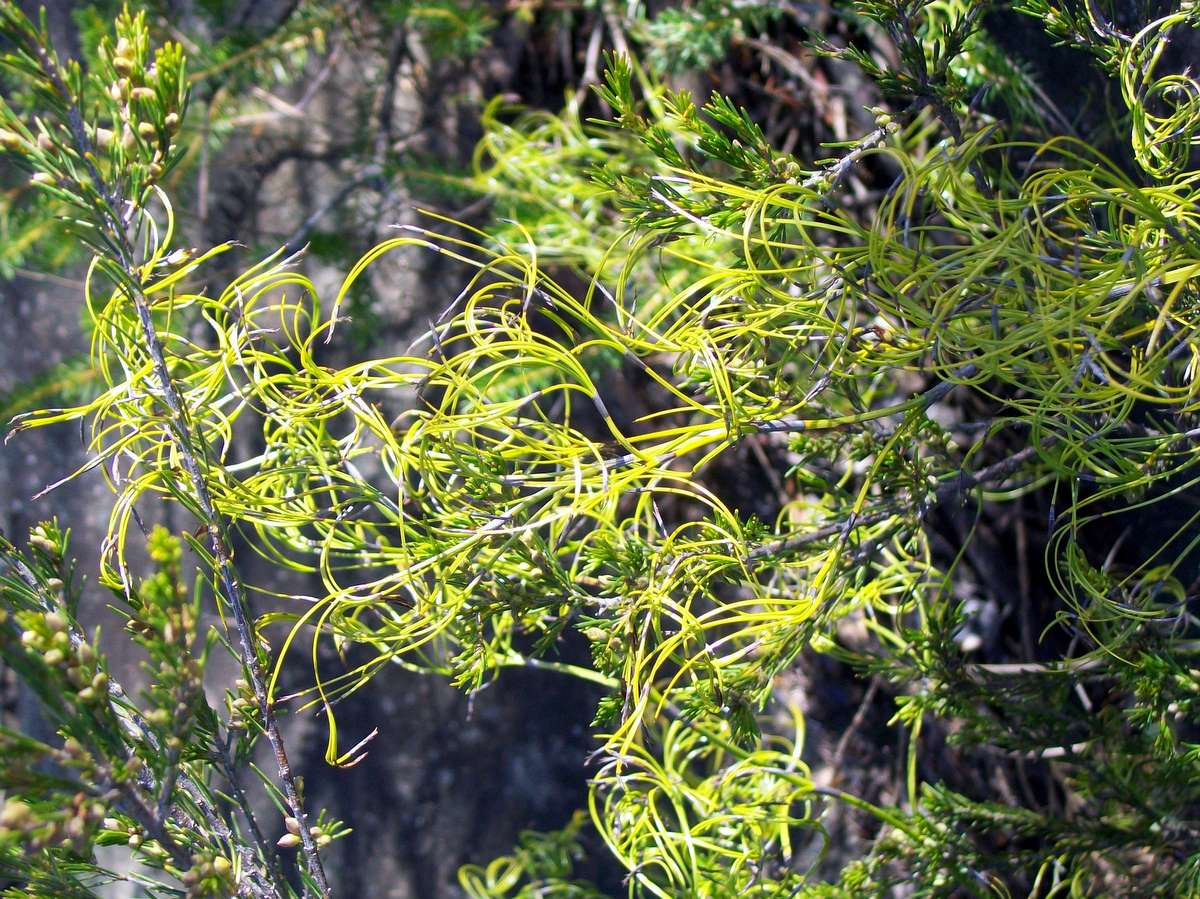

Scientific classification
- Kingdom: Plantae
- Clade: Tracheophytes
- Clade: Angiosperms
- Clade: Monocots
- Clade: Commelinids
- Order: Poales
- Family: Cyperaceae
- Genus: Caustis
- Species: C. flexuosa

Binomial name
- Caustis flexuosa R.Br.

Synonyms
- Caustis restiacea F.Muell. ex Benth.

= Caustis flexuosa =

Curly wig

Species of plant

Caustis flexuosa is a sedge found in Australia. A graceful plant with attractive curling foliage, it grows to 120 cm high. Common names include curly wig and grandfather's beard.

Flowering occurs in spring and summer. Flowers being thin and cream, about 5 mm long. Followed by a pale coloured nut, 3.5 to 5 mm long and 1.8 to 2.5 mm in diameter.

It grows on the poorer soils in eastern Australia, based on granite or sandstone. In New South Wales it occurs on the coast and tablelands and is commonly seen around Sydney and the Blue Mountains. The species is also seen as far west as Warrumbungle National Park and near Mudgee. In Victoria it occurs across the southern half of the state from Croajingolong National Park in the east to Dergholm State Park in the west.
