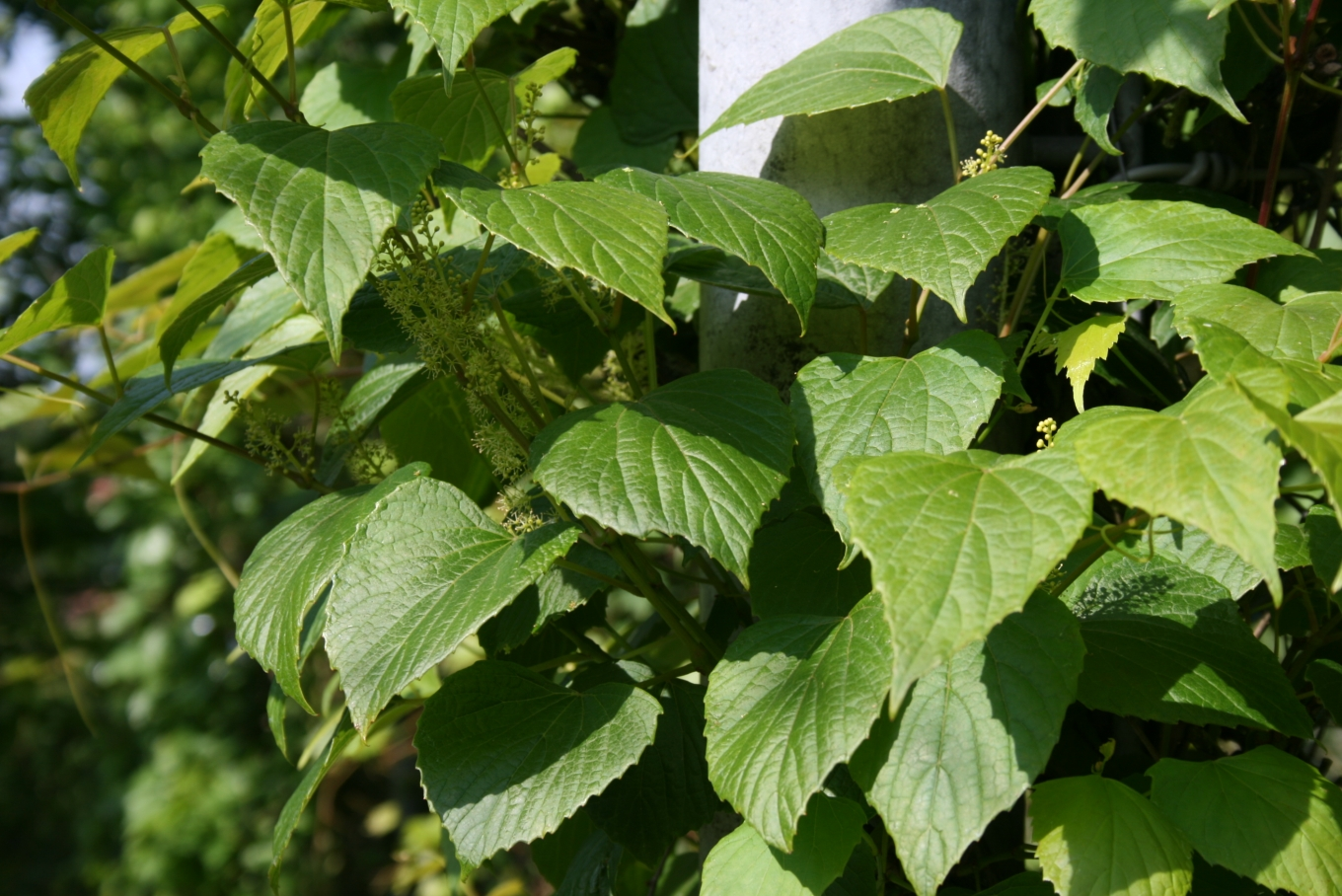
- Creeping grape leaves on vines

Scientific classification
- Kingdom: Plantae
- Clade: Tracheophytes
- Clade: Angiosperms
- Clade: Eudicots
- Clade: Rosids
- Order: Vitales
- Family: Vitaceae
- Genus: Vitis
- Species: V. flexuosa

Binomial name
- Vitis flexuosa Thunb.

Synonyms
- V. flexuosa var. parvifolia (Roxb.) Gagnep. V. indica Thunb. V. parvifolia Roxb. V. wallichii DC. List source

= Vitis flexuosa =

Creeping grape

Species of grapevine

Vitis flexuosa is a species of liana in the grape family.

It has a very large native range in Asian tropical and temperate climate zones.

== Distribution ==
The vine is native to:

- East Asia in Taiwan; the Koreas, Hong Kong; the Chinese provinces of Anhui, Fujian, Gansu, Guangdong, Guangxi, Guizhou, Henan, Hubei, Hunan, Jiangsu, Jiangxi, Shaanxi, Shandong, Sichuan, Yunnan, and Zhejiang; and the Japanese prefectures of Hokkaido, Honshu, Kyushu, Shikoku, and the Ryukyu Islands.
- Southeast Asia in Laos, Thailand, and Vietnam.
- Malesia in the Philippines.
- Indian subcontinent in the Indian states of Assam, Himachal Pradesh, Jammu and Kashmir, Manipur, Uttar Pradesh and West Bengal; Nepal; northern Pakistan.

== Chemistry ==
Flexuosol A is a stilbene tetramer found in V. flexuosa.
