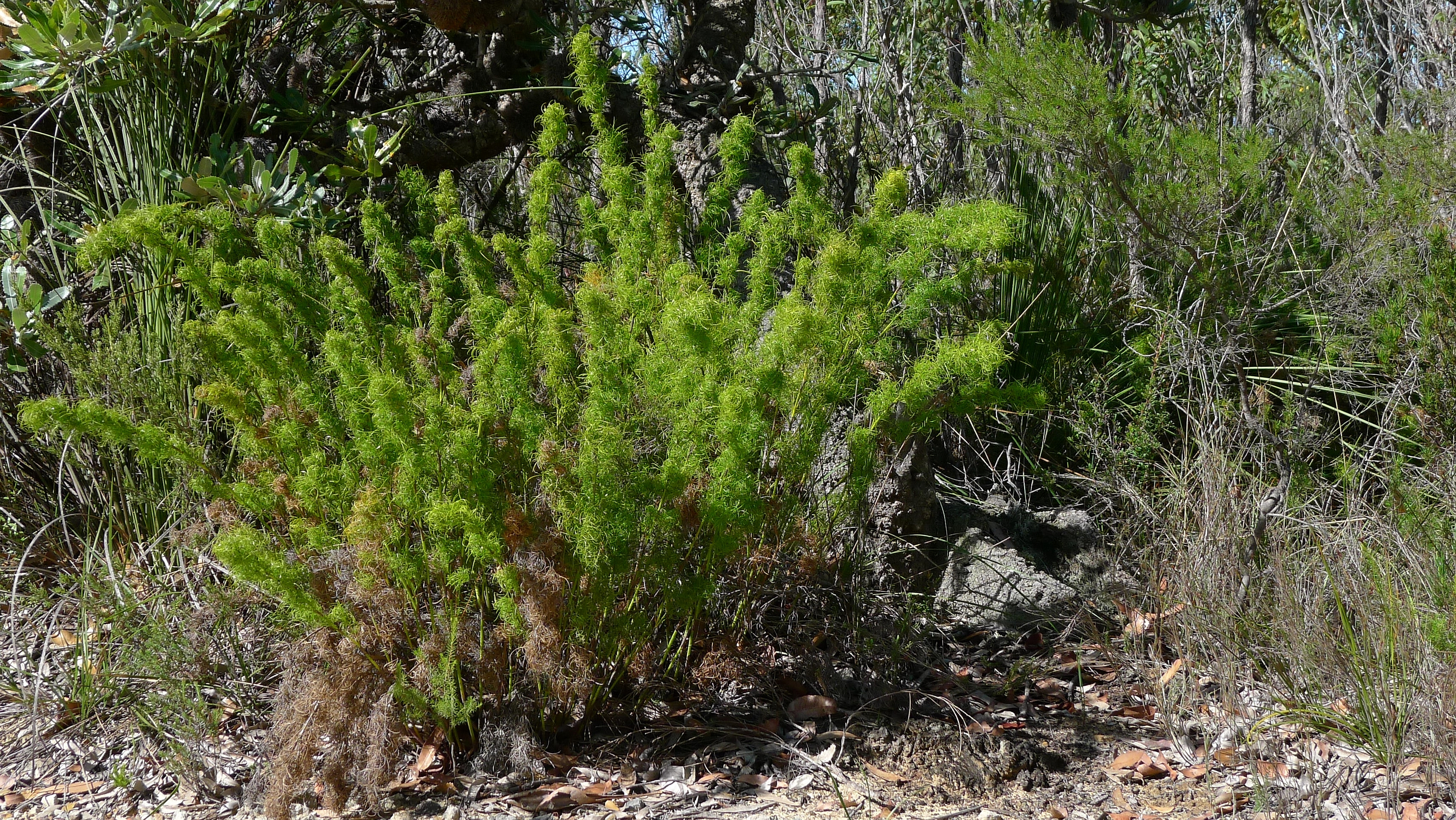
- Caustis recurvata at Royal National Park, NSW, Australia

Scientific classification
- Kingdom: Plantae
- Clade: Tracheophytes
- Clade: Angiosperms
- Clade: Monocots
- Clade: Commelinids
- Order: Poales
- Family: Cyperaceae
- Genus: Caustis
- Species: C. recurvata

Binomial name
- Caustis recurvata Spreng.

= Caustis recurvata =

Curly sedge

Species of grass-like plant

Caustis recurvata, commonly known as curly sedge or pubic hair sedge, is a sedge of the family Cyperaceae that is native to Australia.

The perennial rhizomous sedge has a spreading tufted habit and typically grows to a height and width of around 1.2 metres (3.9 ft). The erect, smooth culms are scaberulous or hispid with a length of 15 to 70 millimetres (0.59 to 2.76 in) and a diameter of 1 to 5 mm (0.039 to 0.197 in).

The species was first formally described by the botanist Kurt Polycarp Joachim Sprengel in 1827 as part of the work Curae Posteriores as published in Systema Vegetabilium. Two synonyms are known; Restio uncinatus and Caustis uncinata.

It is found in coastal sandy heath and mountain heath but mostly along the coast. It extends from south eastern New South Wales north along the coast and into south eastern Queensland.
