= Vitisin C =

- Chemical structure of vitisin C

Names
- Preferred IUPAC name (2^{2}S,2^{3}S,3^{2}R,3^{3}S,4E,6^{2}S,6^{3}S)-2^{2},3^{2},6^{2}-Tris(4-hydroxyphenyl)-2^{2},2^{3},3^{2},3^{3},6^{2},6^{3}-hexahydro-2(3,4),3(3,5),6(4,3)-tris([1]benzofurana)-1,7(1)-dibenzenaheptaphan-4-ene-1^{3},1^{5},2^{6},6^{6},7^{3},7^{5}-hexol

Identifiers
CAS Number	180580-73-8
3D model (JSmol)	Interactive image; Interactive image
ChEMBL	ChEMBL442911
ChemSpider	17301998
PubChem CID	16145527
UNII	M2HXT5SWE2
CompTox Dashboard (EPA)	DTXSID10583213
- InChI: InChI=1S/C56H42O12/c57-35-10-4-29(5-11-35)54-50(33-19-38(60)23-39(61)20-33)49-32(18-42(64)26-47(49)67-54)3-1-28-2-16-46-44(17-28)52(56(66-46)31-8-14-37(59)15-9-31)45-25-43(65)27-48-53(45)51(34-21-40(62)24-41(63)22-34)55(68-48)30-6-12-36(58)13-7-30/h1-27,50-52,54-65H/b3-1+/t50-,51-,52+,54+,55+,56-/m0/s1 Key: WZKKRZSJTLGPHH-WHSOPTDBSA-N; InChI=1/C56H42O12/c57-35-10-4-29(5-11-35)54-50(33-19-38(60)23-39(61)20-33)49-32(18-42(64)26-47(49)67-54)3-1-28-2-16-46-44(17-28)52(56(66-46)31-8-14-37(59)15-9-31)45-25-43(65)27-48-53(45)51(34-21-40(62)24-41(63)22-34)55(68-48)30-6-12-36(58)13-7-30/h1-27,50-52,54-65H/b3-1+/t50-,51-,52+,54+,55+,56-/m0/s1 Key: WZKKRZSJTLGPHH-WHSOPTDBBK
- SMILES: OC(C=C1)=CC=C1[C@@H](O2)[C@@H](C3=CC(O)=CC(O)=C3)C4=C2C=C(O)C=C4/C=C/C5=CC([C@H](C6=C([C@H](C7=CC(O)=CC(O)=C7)[C@@H](C8=CC=C(O)C=C8)O9)C9=CC(O)=C6)[C@H](C%10=CC=C(O)C=C%10)O%11)=C%11C=C5; Oc1ccc(cc1)[C@H]4Oc2cc(O)cc(c2[C@@H]4c3cc(O)cc(O)c3)\C=C\c%10ccc%11O[C@@H](c5ccc(O)cc5)[C@@H](c7cc(O)cc8O[C@H](c6ccc(O)cc6)[C@H](c78)c9cc(O)cc(O)c9)c%11c%10

Properties
Chemical formula	C_{56}H_{42}O_{12}
Molar mass	906.940 g·mol^{−1}
- Except where otherwise noted, data are given for materials in their standard state (at 25 °C [77 °F], 100 kPa). verify (what is ?) Infobox references

Vitisin C is a hydroxystilbenoid. It is a resveratrol tetramer found in plants of the genus Vitis (grapevines).
