= Vitisin A (stilbenoid) =

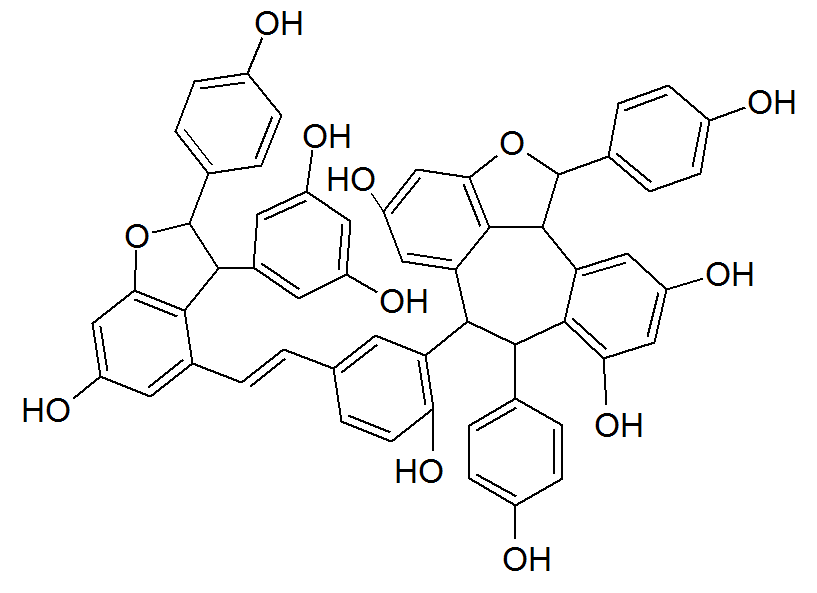
- Chemical structure of vitisin A

Names
- Preferred IUPAC name (2^{1}S,2^{6}R,2^{7}S,4E,6^{2}S,6^{3}S)-2^{7},6^{2}-Bis(4-hydroxyphenyl)-2^{1},2^{6},2^{7},2^{11b},6^{2},6^{3}-hexahydro-2(1,6)-benzo[6,7]cyclohepta[1,2,3-cd][1]benzofurana-6(4,3)-[1]benzofurana-1,7(1),3(1,3)-tribenzenaheptaphan-4-ene-1^{4},2^{4},2^{8},2^{10},3^{6},6^{6},7^{3},7^{5}-octol
- Other names R2-Viniferin

Identifiers
| CAS Number | 142449-89-6 = |
| 3D model (JSmol) | Interactive image |
| ChEMBL | ChEMBL507409 |
| ChemSpider | 17288137 |
| PubChem CID | 16131430 |
| UNII | 832N5294M6 |
| CompTox Dashboard (EPA) | DTXSID901029696 |
- InChI: InChI=1S/C56H42O12/c57-33-10-4-28(5-11-33)49-51(42-23-40(64)26-47-53(42)54(43-22-39(63)24-45(66)52(43)49)56(68-47)30-8-14-35(59)15-9-30)41-17-27(2-16-44(41)65)1-3-31-18-38(62)25-46-48(31)50(32-19-36(60)21-37(61)20-32)55(67-46)29-6-12-34(58)13-7-29/h1-26,49-51,54-66H/b3-1+/t49-,50+,51+,54+,55-,56-/m1/s1 Key: XAXVWWYPKOGXSY-DBHYGPPCSA-N; InChI=1/C56H42O12/c57-33-10-4-28(5-11-33)49-51(42-23-40(64)26-47-53(42)54(43-22-39(63)24-45(66)52(43)49)56(68-47)30-8-14-35(59)15-9-30)41-17-27(2-16-44(41)65)1-3-31-18-38(62)25-46-48(31)50(32-19-36(60)21-37(61)20-32)55(67-46)29-6-12-34(58)13-7-29/h1-26,49-51,54-66H/b3-1+/t49-,50+,51+,54+,55-,56-/m1/s1 Key: XAXVWWYPKOGXSY-DBHYGPPCBS
- SMILES: c1cc(ccc1[C@H]2c3c(cc(cc3O)O)[C@H]4c5c(cc(cc5O[C@@H]4c6ccc(cc6)O)O)[C@@H]2c7cc(ccc7O)/C=C/c8cc(cc9c8[C@@H]([C@H](O9)c1ccc(cc1)O)c1cc(cc(c1)O)O)O)O

Properties
| Chemical formula | C_{56}H_{42}O_{12} |
| Molar mass | 906.92 g/mol |
- Except where otherwise noted, data are given for materials in their standard state (at 25 °C [77 °F], 100 kPa). verify (what is ?) Infobox references

Vitisin A is a resveratrol tetramer found in plants of the genus Vitis. It is a complex of two resveratrol dimers, (+)-epsilon-viniferin and ampelopsin B.

It shows an opposite effect to hopeaphenol on apoptosis of myocytes isolated from adult rat heart.
