= Α-Viniferin =

α-Viniferin

Names
- Preferred IUPAC name (1R,5bR,6R,10bS,11S,15bR)-1,6,11-Tris(4-hydroxyphenyl)-1,5b,6,10b,11,15b-hexahydrocyclonona[1,2,3-cd:4,5,6-c′d′:7,8,9-c′′d′′]tris([1]benzofuran)-4,9,14-triol
- Other names α-Viniferin; (+)-α-Viniferin

Identifiers
CAS Number	62218-13-7
3D model (JSmol)	Interactive image; Interactive image
ChEBI	CHEBI:66359
ChEMBL	ChEMBL443463
ChemSpider	333272
PubChem CID	196402
UNII	53XER6FHLX
CompTox Dashboard (EPA)	DTXSID40211274
- InChI: InChI=1S/C42H30O9/c43-22-7-1-19(2-8-22)40-37-28-13-25(46)17-32-35(28)39(42(50-32)21-5-11-24(45)12-6-21)30-15-27(48)18-33-36(30)38(29-14-26(47)16-31(49-40)34(29)37)41(51-33)20-3-9-23(44)10-4-20/h1-18,37-48H Key: KUTVNHOAKHJJFL-UHFFFAOYSA-N; InChI=1/C42H30O9/c43-22-7-1-19(2-8-22)40-37-28-13-25(46)17-32-35(28)39(42(50-32)21-5-11-24(45)12-6-21)30-15-27(48)18-33-36(30)38(29-14-26(47)16-31(49-40)34(29)37)41(51-33)20-3-9-23(44)10-4-20/h1-18,37-48H Key: KUTVNHOAKHJJFL-UHFFFAOYAE
- SMILES: OC(C=C1)=CC=C1[C@@H]2[C@@H](C3=C4C(O[C@@H](C5=CC=C(O)C=C5)[C@@H]4C6=C([C@@H]7[C@H](C8=CC=C(O)C=C8)O9)C9=CC(O)=C6)=CC(O)=C3)C%10=C7C=C(O)C=C%10O2; Oc1ccc(cc1)C%10Oc2cc(O)cc7c2C%10c8cc(O)cc9OC(c3ccc(O)cc3)C(c5cc(O)cc6OC(c4ccc(O)cc4)C7c56)c89

Properties
Chemical formula	C_{42}H_{30}O_{9}
Molar mass	678.693 g·mol^{−1}
- Except where otherwise noted, data are given for materials in their standard state (at 25 °C [77 °F], 100 kPa). verify (what is ?) Infobox references

α-Viniferin is a stilbene trimer. It can be isolated from Caragana chamlagu and from Caragana sinica and from the stem bark of Dryobalanops aromatica. It is also present in relation to resistance to Botrytis cinerea and Plasmopara viticola in Vitis vinifera and Vitis riparia. It has been shown to inhibit acetylcholinesterase.
