= Vitisin B (stilbenoid) =

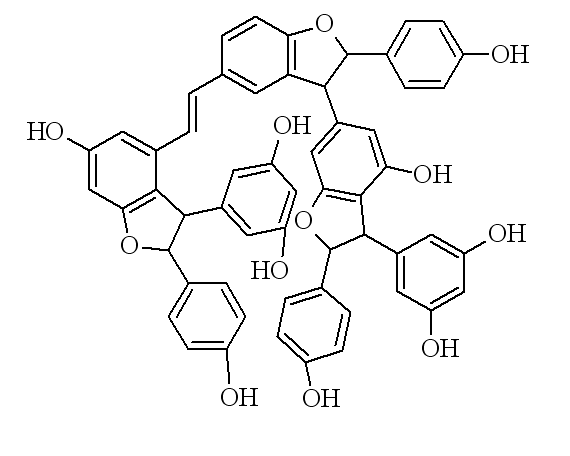
- Chemical structure of vitisin B

Names
- Preferred IUPAC name (2^{2}R,2^{3}R,3^{2}R,3^{3}R,4E,6^{2}R,6^{3}R)-2^{2},3^{2},6^{2}-Tris(4-hydroxyphenyl)-2^{2},2^{3},3^{2},3^{3},6^{2},6^{3}-hexahydro-2(3,6),3(3,5),6(4,3)-tris([1]benzofurana)-1,7(1)-dibenzenaheptaphan-4-ene-1^{3},1^{5},2^{4},6^{6},7^{3},7^{5}-hexol
- Other names R-Viniferin

Identifiers
| 3D model (JSmol) | Interactive image |
| ChEBI | CHEBI:189579 |
| ChemSpider | 17290428 |
| PubChem CID | 16133855 |
| CompTox Dashboard (EPA) | DTXSID601029954 |
- InChI: InChI=1S/C56H42O12/c57-36-10-4-29(5-11-36)54-49(35-23-45(65)53-47(24-35)67-56(31-8-14-38(59)15-9-31)52(53)34-21-41(62)26-42(63)22-34)44-17-28(2-16-46(44)66-54)1-3-32-18-43(64)27-48-50(32)51(33-19-39(60)25-40(61)20-33)55(68-48)30-6-12-37(58)13-7-30/h1-27,49,51-52,54-65H/b3-1+/t49-,51-,52-,54+,55+,56+/m1/s1 Key: SPRFPODGXUUTIB-APEUUSFDSA-N
- SMILES: c1cc(ccc1[C@H]2[C@@H](c3cc(ccc3O2)/C=C/c4cc(cc5c4[C@H]([C@@H](O5)c6ccc(cc6)O)c7cc(cc(c7)O)O)O)c8cc(c9c(c8)O[C@H]([C@@H]9c1cc(cc(c1)O)O)c1ccc(cc1)O)O)O

Properties
| Chemical formula | C_{56}H_{42}O_{12} |
| Molar mass | 906.92 g/mol |
- Except where otherwise noted, data are given for materials in their standard state (at 25 °C [77 °F], 100 kPa). verify (what is ?) Infobox references

Vitisin B is a resveratrol tetramer found in plants of the genus Vitis.
