= Tetramer =

Oligomer formed from four monomers or subunits

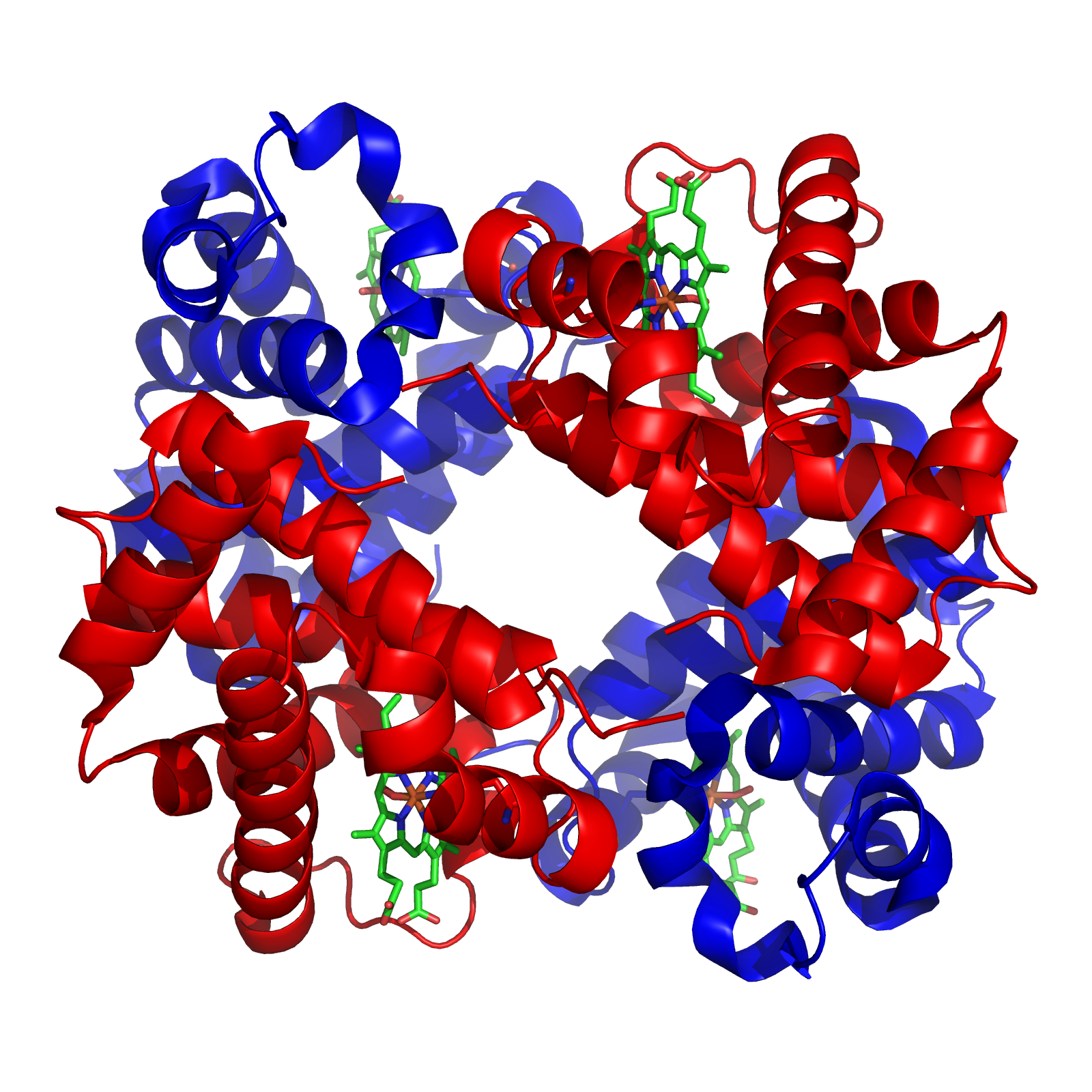
An example of a subunit, human hemoglobin. The protein's α and β subunits are coloured red and blue.

A tetramer (/ˈtɛtrəmər/) (tetra-, "four" + -mer, "parts") is an oligomer formed from four monomers or subunits. The associated property is called tetramery. An example from inorganic chemistry is titanium methoxide with the empirical formula Ti(OCH_{3})_{4}, which is tetrameric in solid state and has the molecular formula Ti_{4}(OCH_{3})_{16}. An example from organic chemistry is kobophenol A, a substance that is formed by combining four molecules of resveratrol.

In biochemistry, it similarly refers to a biomolecule formed of four units, that are the same (homotetramer), i.e. as in Concanavalin A or different (heterotetramer), i.e. as in hemoglobin. Hemoglobin has 4 similar sub-units while immunoglobulins have 2 very different sub-units. The different sub-units may have each their own activity, such as binding biotin in avidin tetramers, or have a common biological property, such as the allosteric binding of oxygen in hemoglobin.

== See also ==
- Cluster chemistry; atomic and molecular clusters
- Tetrameric protein
- Tetramerium, a genus of plants belonging to the family Acanthaceae
- Tetramery (botany), having four parts in a distinct whorl of a plant structure
