= Funicin =

Names
- IUPAC name Ethyl 2-hydroxy-4-(3-hydroxy-5-methylphenoxy)-6-methylbenzoate
- Other names: 4-Carbethoxydiorcinal; Ethericin B

Identifiers
CAS Number	74605-28-0
3D model (JSmol)	Interactive image
ChemSpider	4425121
PubChem CID	5259896
CompTox Dashboard (EPA)	DTXSID70225586
- InChI: InChI=1S/C17H18O5/c1-4-21-17(20)16-11(3)7-14(9-15(16)19)22-13-6-10(2)5-12(18)8-13/h5-9,18-19H,4H2,1-3H3 Key: FDRRGHPJYCPGME-UHFFFAOYSA-N
- SMILES: CCOC(=O)C1=C(C=C(C=C1C)OC2=CC(=CC(=C2)O)C)O

Properties
Chemical formula	C_{17}H_{18}O_{5}
Molar mass	302.326 g·mol^{−1}
- Except where otherwise noted, data are given for materials in their standard state (at 25 °C [77 °F], 100 kPa). Infobox references

Funicin is an antibiotic which is produced by the fungi Aspergillus funiculosus. Funicin has the molecular formula C_{17}H_{18}O_{5}
