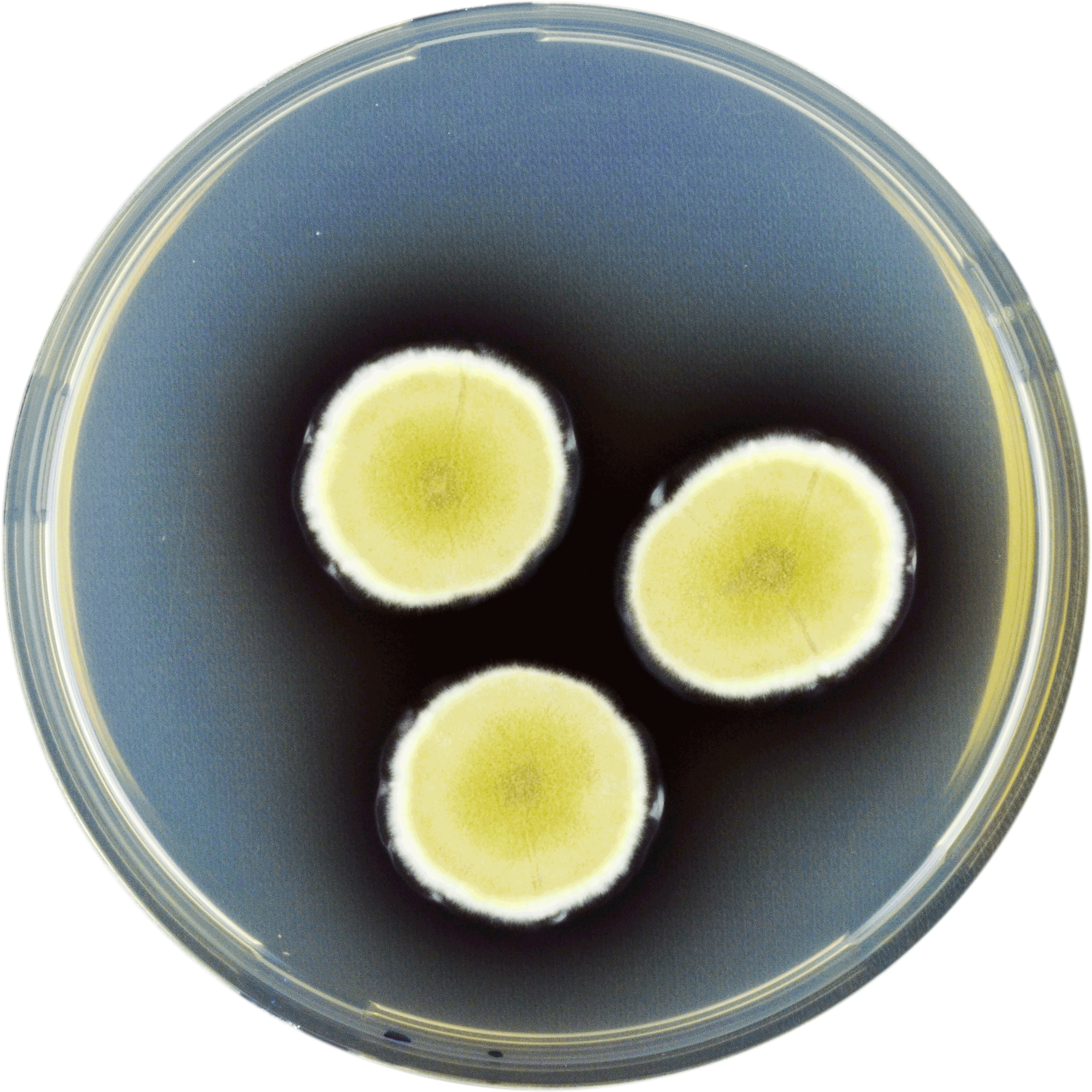

Scientific classification
- Kingdom: Fungi
- Division: Ascomycota
- Class: Eurotiomycetes
- Order: Eurotiales
- Family: Aspergillaceae
- Genus: Aspergillus
- Species: A. funiculosus

Binomial name
- Aspergillus funiculosus G. Sm., 1956

= Aspergillus funiculosus =

Species of fungus

Aspergillus funiculosus is an anamorph species of fungus in the genus Aspergillus. Aspergillus funiculosus produces the funiculolides A-D and the antibiotic funicin.
