= C7H6O4 =

The molecular formula C_{7}H_{6}O_{4} may refer to:

- Dihydroxybenzoic acids, a type of phenolic acids
  - 2,3-Dihydroxybenzoic acid (2-pyrocatechuic acid or hypogallic acid)
  - 2,4-Dihydroxybenzoic acid (β-resorcylic acid)
  - 2,5-Dihydroxybenzoic acid (gentisic acid)
  - 2,6-Dihydroxybenzoic acid (γ-resorcylic acid)
  - 3,4-Dihydroxybenzoic acid (protocatechuic acid)
  - 3,5-Dihydroxybenzoic acid (α-resorcylic acid)
- Patulin, a mycotoxin produced by a variety of molds
