= Resorcylic acid =

Resorcylic acid, resorcinolic acid, or carboxyresorcinol are names for a type of dihydroxybenzoic acid structurally related to resorcinol. They may refer to:

- 3,5-Dihydroxybenzoic acid (α-resorcylic acid or 5-carboxyresorcinol)
- 2,4-Dihydroxybenzoic acid (β-resorcylic acid or 4-carboxyresorcinol)
- 2,6-Dihydroxybenzoic acid (γ-resorcylic acid or 2-carboxyresorcinol)

In each case, the hydroxyl groups are meta to each other and thus are m-dihydroxybenzoic acids.

Carboxylates and esters of these compounds are called resorcylates or resorcinolates.

== See also ==
- Resorcinolic lipid, non-fatty acid lipid derivatives of resorcinol
