= Hydroxysalicylic acid =

Hydroxysalicylic acid is a type of dihydroxybenzoic acid and a hydroxylated derivative of salicylic acid. It may refer to:

- 2,3-Dihydroxybenzoic acid (3-hydroxysalicylic acid)
- 2,4-Dihydroxybenzoic acid (4-hydroxysalicylic acid)
- 2,5-Dihydroxybenzoic acid (5-hydroxysalicylic acid)
- 2,6-Dihydroxybenzoic acid (6-hydroxysalicylic acid)

Carboxylates and esters of these acids are called hydroxysalicylates
