= C9H10O4 =

The molecular formula C_{9}H_{10}O_{4} (molar mass : 182.17 g/mol, exact mass : 182.05790878 u) may refer to:

- 3,5-Dihydroxyphenylpropionoic acid, a metabolite of alkylresorcinols
- Dihydrocaffeic acid, a phenolic compound
- Ethyl protocatechuate, a phenolic compound
- Flopropione
- Homovanillic acid
- m-Hydroxyphenylhydracrylic acid
- Methylenomycin A
- Syringaldehyde
- Veratric acid, a benzoic acid derivative
