= C7H6O6 =

The molecular formula C_{7}H_{6}O_{6} (molar mass: 186.11 g/mol, exact mass: 186.01643790 u) may refer to:

- 3-Carboxy-cis,cis-muconic acid
- 3-Fumarylpyruvic acid
- 3-Maleylpyruvic acid
