= NAAC =

NAAC may refer to:

- National Assessment and Accreditation Council, an organization that assesses and accredits institutions of higher education in India.
- North Africa American Cemetery and Memorial, near Carthage, Tunisia.
- North American Anglican Conference, a federation of Continuing Anglican church bodies in the United States and Canada.
- NaAc, the chemical compound Sodium Acetate.
- 2-oxo-3-(5-oxofuran-2-ylidene)propanoate lactonase, an enzyme
- the National Association of Agency Companies, the historical name for the U.S. Direct Selling Association
