= Mirubactin =

Names
- IUPAC name (2R)-2-[[(2R)-5-(Diaminomethylideneamino)-2-[(2,3-dihydroxybenzoyl)amino]pentanoyl]amino]-5-[(2,3-dihydroxybenzoyl)oxy-formylamino]pentanoic acid

Identifiers
3D model (JSmol)	Interactive image
ChEBI	CHEBI:218566
ChemSpider	78440503
PubChem CID	59051490
CompTox Dashboard (EPA)	DTXSID601336341
- InChI: InChI=1S/C26H32N6O11/c27-26(28)29-11-3-7-16(30-22(38)14-5-1-9-18(34)20(14)36)23(39)31-17(24(40)41)8-4-12-32(13-33)43-25(42)15-6-2-10-19(35)21(15)37/h1-2,5-6,9-10,13,16-17,34-37H,3-4,7-8,11-12H2,(H,30,38)(H,31,39)(H,40,41)(H4,27,28,29)/t16-,17-/m1/s1 Key: JANBVBCLMZUUHR-IAGOWNOFSA-N
- SMILES: C1=CC(=C(C(=C1)O)O)C(=O)N[C@H](CCCN=C(N)N)C(=O)N[C@H](CCCN(C=O)OC(=O)C2=C(C(=CC=C2)O)O)C(=O)O

Properties
Chemical formula	C_{26}H_{32}N_{6}O_{11}
Molar mass	604.573 g·mol^{−1}
- Except where otherwise noted, data are given for materials in their standard state (at 25 °C [77 °F], 100 kPa). Infobox references

Mirubactin is a siderophore produced by the bacterium Actinosynnema mirum. A. mirum was first isolated from the Raritan River in New Jersey in 1976, and its full genome sequence was published in 2009. In 2012, mirubactin was isolated and characterized, and the biosynthesis was connected with the gene cluster Amir_2714-Amir_2728, since renamed mrbA-mrbO.

== Biosynthesis ==
The largest gene in the mrbA-mrbO cluster, mrbJ, encodes a two-module nonribosomal peptide synthetase. Mirubactin assembly uses two nonproteinogenic units, 2,3-dihydroxybenzoic acid (2,3-DHB) and δ-N-formyl-δ-N-hydroxyornithine (fhOrn). MrbC and MrbD work to activate and incorporate 2,3-DHB into the nonribosomal peptide synthesis. The 2,3-DHB is incorporated on both the N- and C- termini, and is attached to the δ-N-hydroxyl group of fhOrn to form a O-acyl-hydroxamic acid ester. At the start of the assembly, 2,3-DHB is activated by MrbC and subsequently passed to MrbD, where it is attached to the arginine in the first module by MrbJ. The second module of MrbJ incorporates fhOrn, which is generated by the tailoring enzymes Amir_5066 and Amir_1095. The second addition of 2,3-DHB is followed by a hydrolytic cleavage, releasing the siderophore.

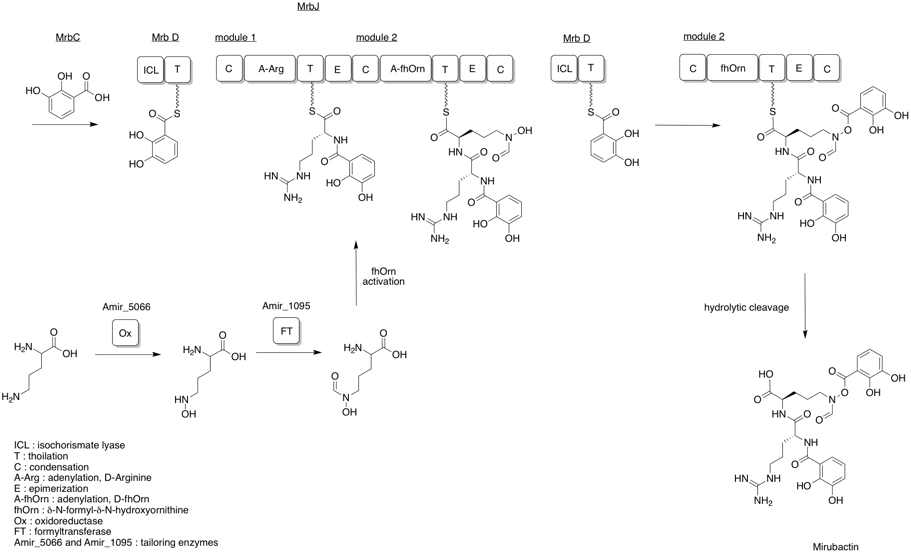
Biosynthesis of mirubactin as proposed by Giessen, T. and coworkers (2012).
