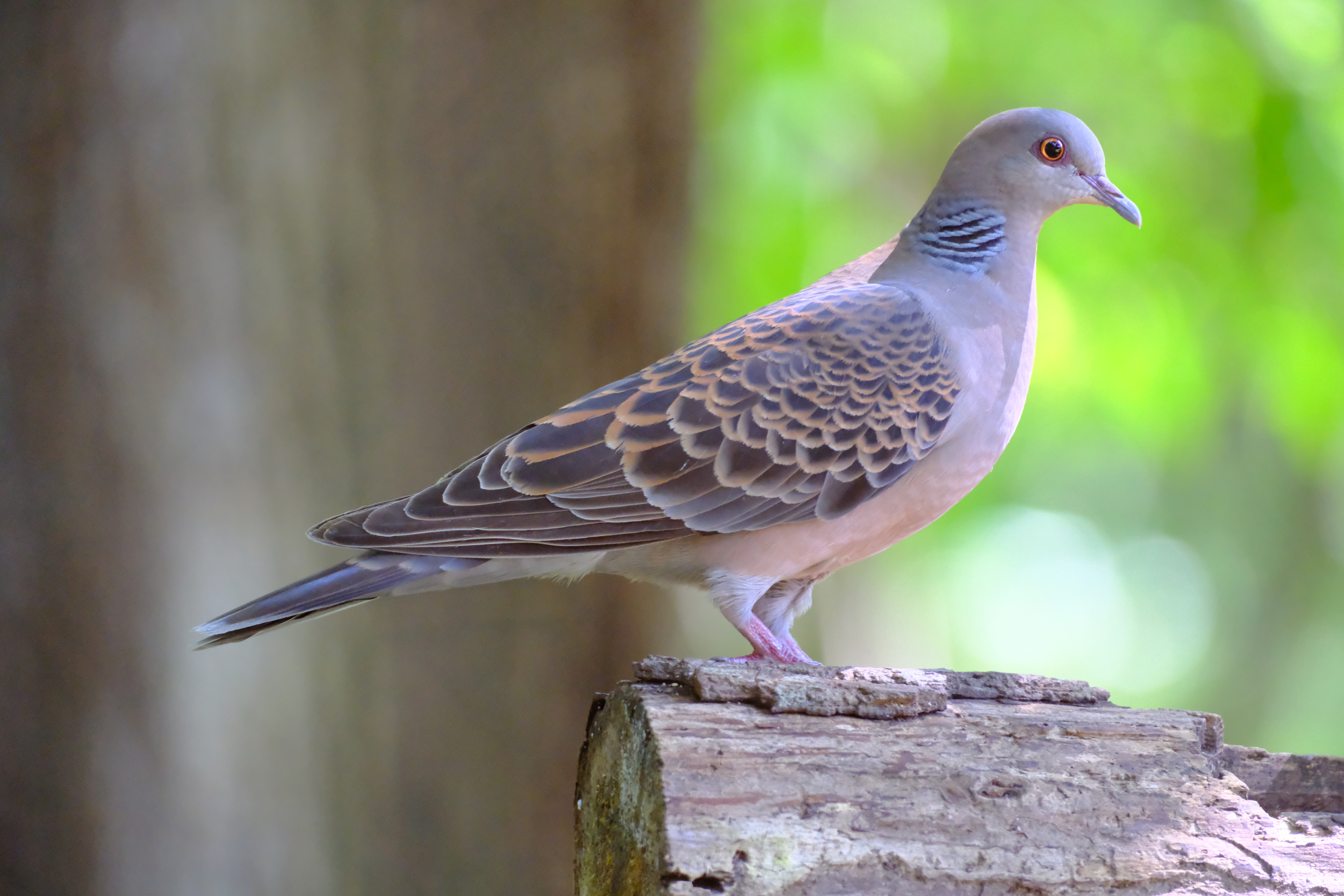
- S. o. orientalis, Japan

Conservation status
- Least Concern (IUCN 3.1)

Scientific classification
- Kingdom: Animalia
- Phylum: Chordata
- Class: Aves
- Order: Columbiformes
- Family: Columbidae
- Genus: Streptopelia
- Species: S. orientalis

Binomial name
- Streptopelia orientalis (Latham, 1790)
- Range of S. orientalis Breeding Resident Passage Non-breeding

= Oriental turtle dove =

Species of bird

The Oriental turtle dove or rufous turtle dove (Streptopelia orientalis) is a member of the bird family Columbidae. The species has a wide native distribution range from Central Asia east across Asia to Japan. The populations show variations in the patterning of plumage and have been designated into at least six named subspecies. Populations in the higher latitudes tend to migrate south in winter, while those closer to the tropics are sedentary. Vagrants have been recorded in North America and Europe. The species is predominantly granivorous and forages on the ground.

== Taxonomy ==
- - - - - Streptopelia decaocto
        - Streptopelia roseogrisea
      - Streptopelia decipiens
    - Streptopelia semitorquata
  - - Streptopelia capicola
    - Streptopelia vinacea
- - - - - - - Streptopelia hypopyrrha
            - Streptopelia turtur
        - Streptopelia orientalis
      - Streptopelia bitorquata
  - Streptopelia tranquebarica

Relationship with congeneric species. Maximum likelihood phylogeny based on a 2001 study.

The genus name Streptopelia is from Ancient Greek streptos, "collar" and peleia, "dove". The specific orientalis is Latin for "eastern", in this case referring to the type locality, China.

The species has a wide distribution with geographical variation in plumage that has led to at least six subspecies being designated. The distributions of many are not disjunct and gradation exists except in some island populations. Some of the populations of Streptopelia turtur that occur on the eastern edge can be very similar in appearance to S. orientalis and in the past the two species have been lumped together.

- western Oriental turtle dove (S. o. meena) (Sykes, 1832) – eastern Asia and Central Asia south to the Himalayas from Kashmir to central Nepal. Winters in India as far south as Sri Lanka.
- eastern Oriental turtle dove (S. o. orientalis) (Latham, 1790) – central Siberia to Japan and Korea south to the Himalayas from Assam to Yunnan and northern Vietnam. Winters in South and Southeast Asia (includes S. baicalensis Buturlin).
- S. o. stimpsoni (Stejneger, 1887) – the Ryukyu Islands
- S. o. orii Yamashina, 1932 – Taiwan
- S. o. erythrocephala (Bonaparte, 1855) – southern peninsular India. This subspecies is reddish-brown on the head with no grey on the forehead or crown, unlike the other subspecies. The undertail coverts and terminal tail band are slaty grey.
- S. o. agricola (Tickell, 1833) – from Orissa and Bengal to northeastern India and into Myanmar south to Hainan

The Oriental turtle dove has two distinct migratory northern subspecies, S. o. orientalis in the central Siberian taiga, and S. o. meena in the open woodlands of Central Asia. The differences in the tail patterns of the subspecies S. o. orientalis and S. o. meena help separate identification in their wintering grounds. The nominate form is described as having a grey tip to the tail and more black in the outer web of the outer tail feathers, while meena has a white tip to its tail like the European turtle dove and less black in the outer web of the outer tail feathers. However, these are not consistent differences: both forms can have white or grey tail-bands and orientalis can have little black in the outer webs of the outer tail feathers.

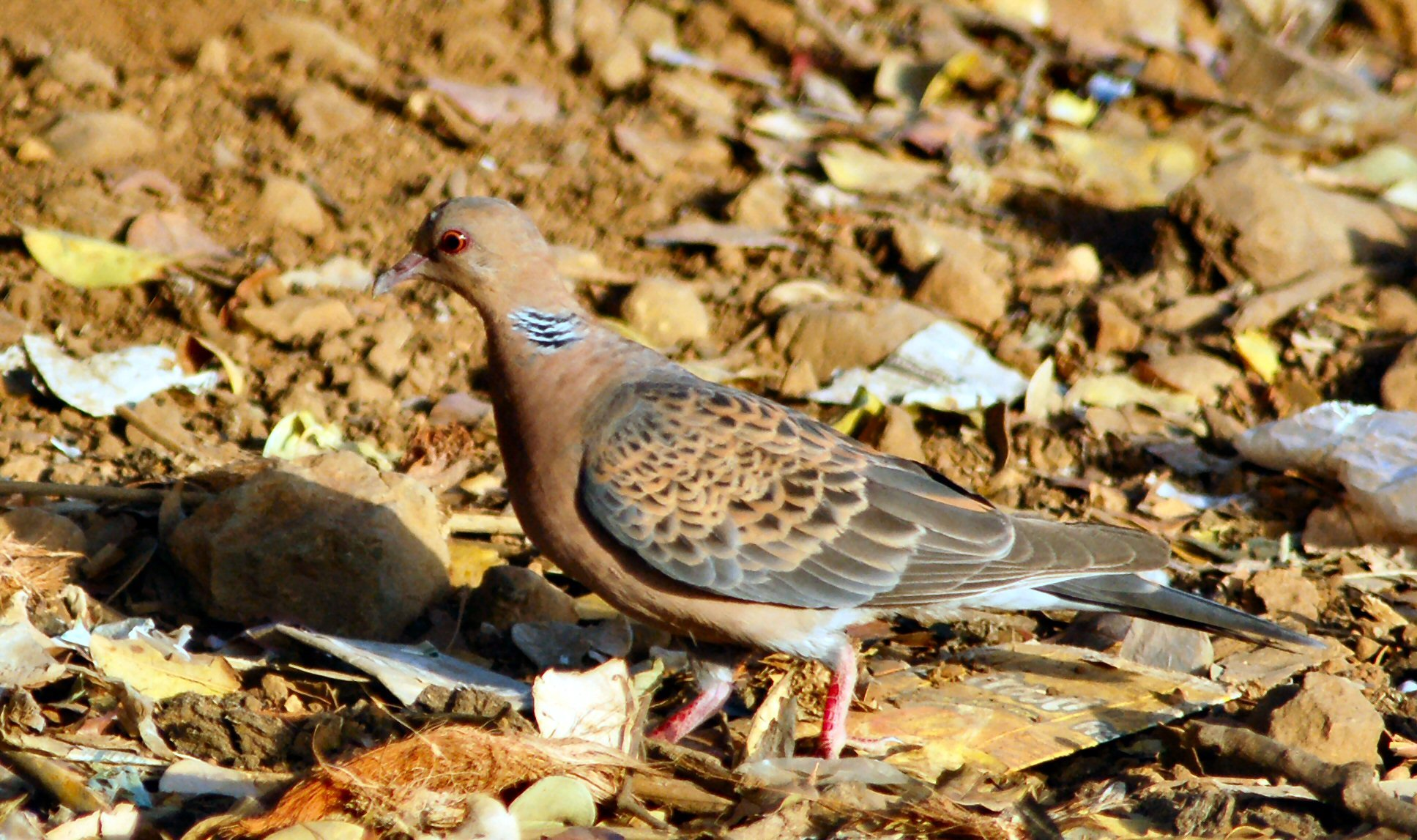
S. o. erythrocephala
southern India

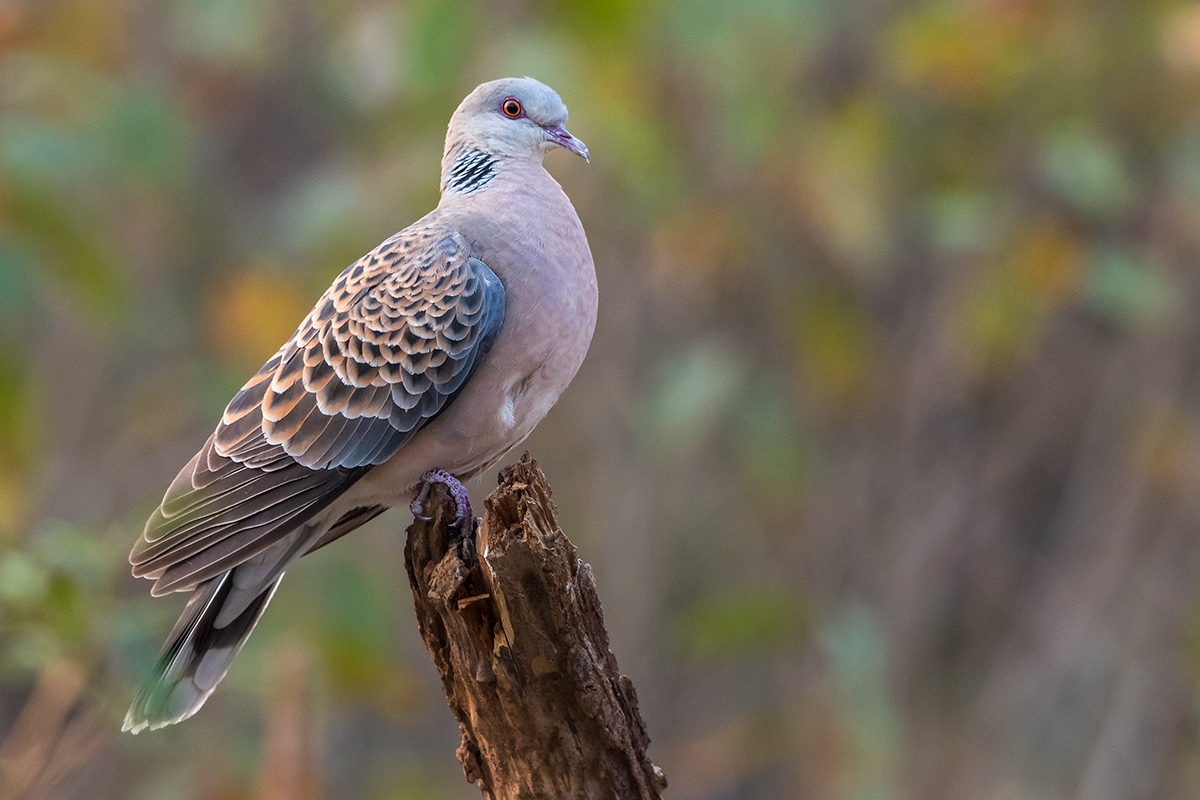
S. o. meena
central Himalayas

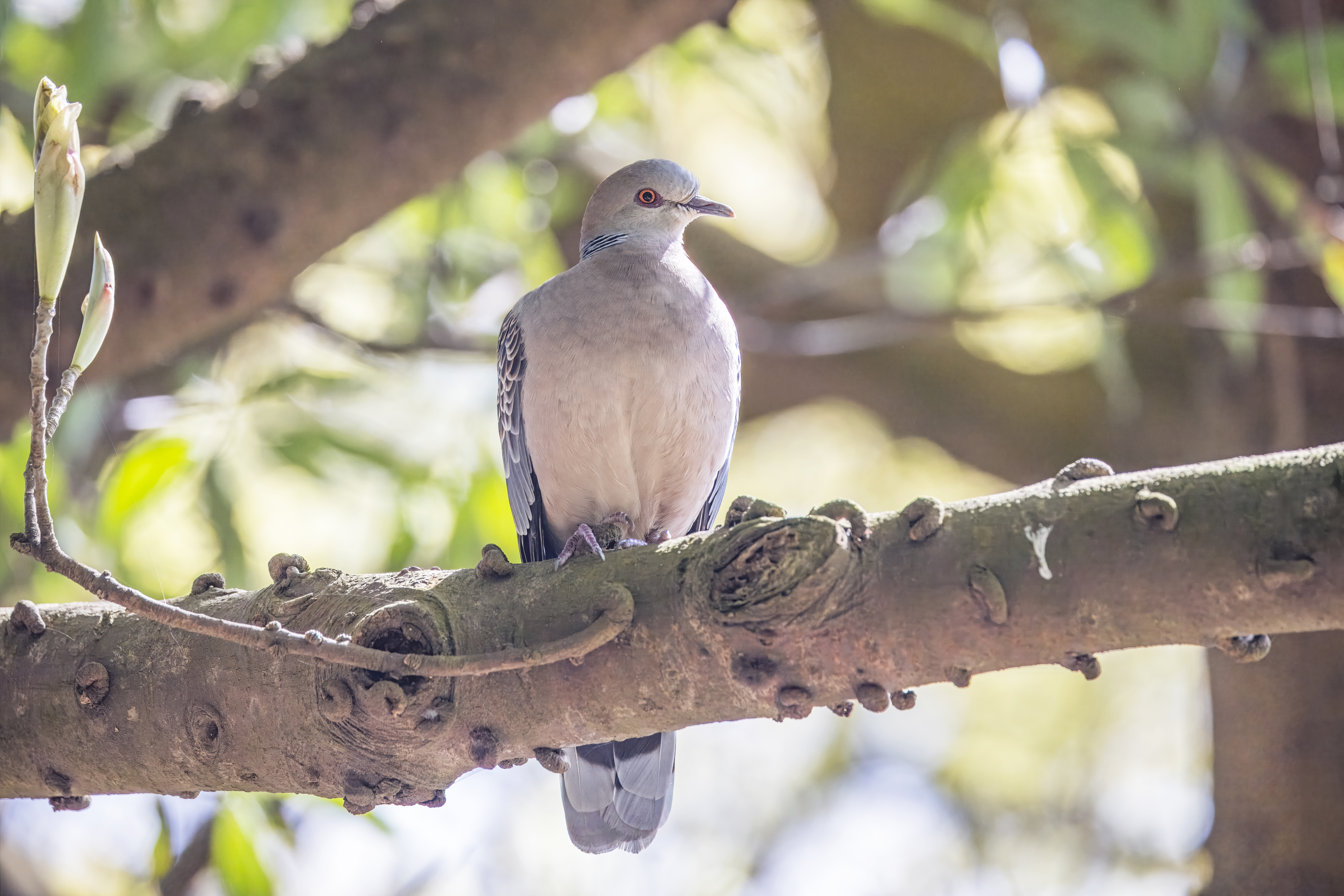
S. o. orii
Taiwan

== Description ==
The Oriental dove is very similar in plumage to the European turtle dove. It is a little larger than that species, particularly in the case of orientalis, about the same size as a collared dove. It shares the black and white striped patch on the side of its neck made of silver-tipped feathers, but the breast is less pink, and the orange-brown wing feathers of the turtle dove are replaced with a browner hue, and darker centres giving a scaly appearance. The tail is wedge shaped, like the turtle dove. The flight is more relaxed and direct than that of its relative. Additionally, the turtle-dove has a bare patch of skin around its eyes, which the oriental dove lacks.

=== Call ===
The calls are different from the purring of the European turtle dove. It is a four-syllable her-her-oo-oo. There are significant call differences within the populations as well.

== Distribution and habitat ==
Oriental turtle doves in Japan

The habitat varies, but the Oriental turtle dove breeds in well-wooded but open habitats and winters in more open habitats but usually with good tree cover.

The breeding range of the westernmost race, meena, marginally extends into the Western Palearctic region. The southernmost populations are resident, but most other birds migrate south to winter in India, the Maldives, and southern Japan. They disperse widely and are known from islands such as the Lakshadweep in winter. S. o. orientalis occurs as a rarity in western Alaska and British Columbia. It is also a vagrant to northern and western Europe and occurrences in Britain tend to gather much attention from twitchers.

== Ecology ==
=== Breeding ===
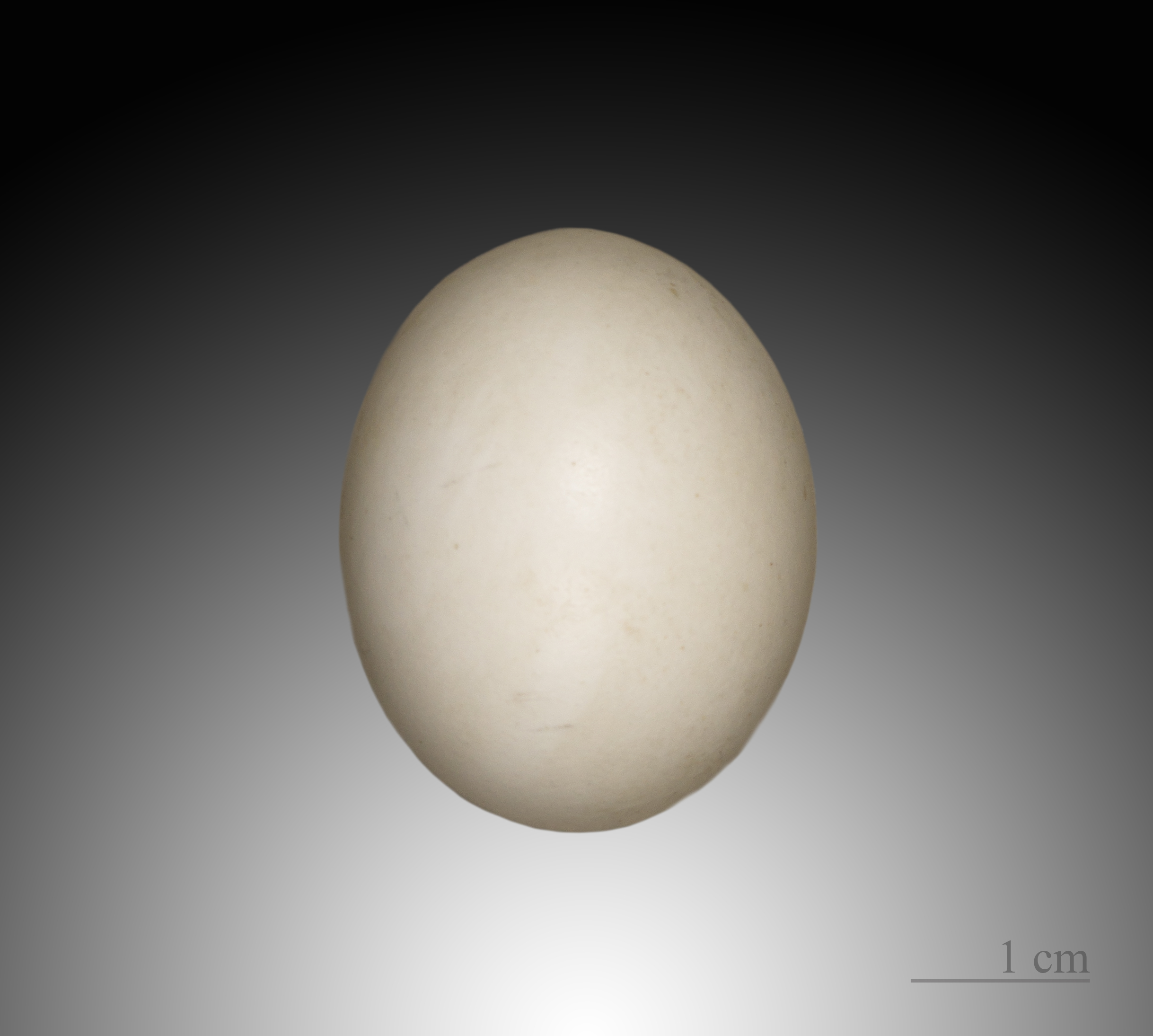
Egg of Streptopelia orientalis

The summer breeding season in the temperate zone can be protracted. In southern India, the breeding season is in winter. In display, the male flaps its wing noisily and shoots up before gliding down with outspread tail. Nests take about two days to build with the male gathering material and the female placing it. The nest is more substantial than in some other doves and is placed at mid-canopy height. In Japan, nests built at a greater height tended to be prone to predation. Males were found to incubate in the day and the female by night. Two white eggs, as for all pigeons and doves, are laid in a twig nest in a tree. Incubation begins immediately after the first egg is laid. The eggs hatch in 15 to 16 days and the chicks take about 15 to 17 days to fledge (in Japan). Both parents feed the altricial chicks with crop milk. Multiple broods may be raised and nests built by the pair or by others may be reused. Nest reuse may possibly increase the chances of predation. In Japan the principal predators of nestlings and eggs were crows and magpies and to a lesser extent cats and snakes.

=== Diet ===
The Oriental turtle dove is granivorous, and feeds on the seeds of hemp, sunflower, wheat, millet and amaranth. It also consumes gastropods. They forage on the ground.

=== Parasites and diseases ===
Nests in Japan that have accumulated faeces have been found to host a number of flies belonging to the families Sphaeroceridae, Sepsidae, and Stratiomyidae.

Subcutaneous mites of the species Hypodectes propus have been recorded in Japan. Deaths of a number of birds due to avian pox virus have been recorded in South Korea.

=== Other associations ===
On Hongdo Island, Korea, migratory doves were found to carry seeds of the exotic Achyranthes japonica attached to their plumage.

== In culture ==
The Ainu people traditionally interpret bird calls as elaborate sayings in their own language. In the case of these doves, the ascribed saying, an amalgam of several, is as follows:

Kusuwep toyta
Huci wakkata
Katkemat suke
Pon tono ipe

Translation:

Turtle dove ploughs,
Grandmother draws water,
Wife cooks,
Little master eats. (Note: It is not clear who the “master” is here. Some say it is the ethnic Yamato exploiting the Ainu people, a position supported by the fact that the word for 'master' used here, tono, is a Japanese loanword. However, the Ainu people also refer to some animals by this title, such as isepo tono 'lord rabbit' or sisoya tono 'lord wasp'. It is also possible that this expression simply refers to the young child of the household.)

The reason the dove is said to be 'ploughing' is that it is often seen burrowing in the fields with its feet in search of food, and thus appears as such.

== Gallery ==
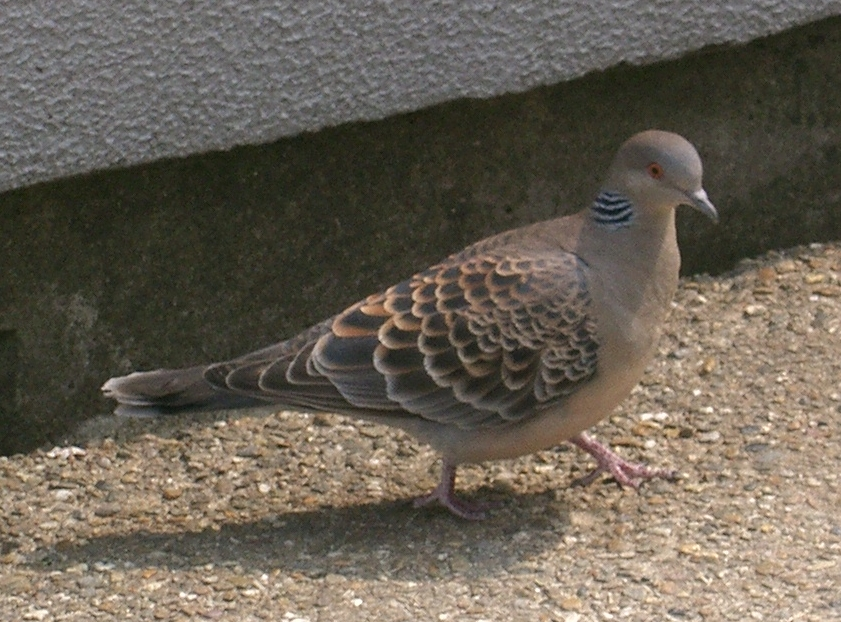
Oriental turtle dove

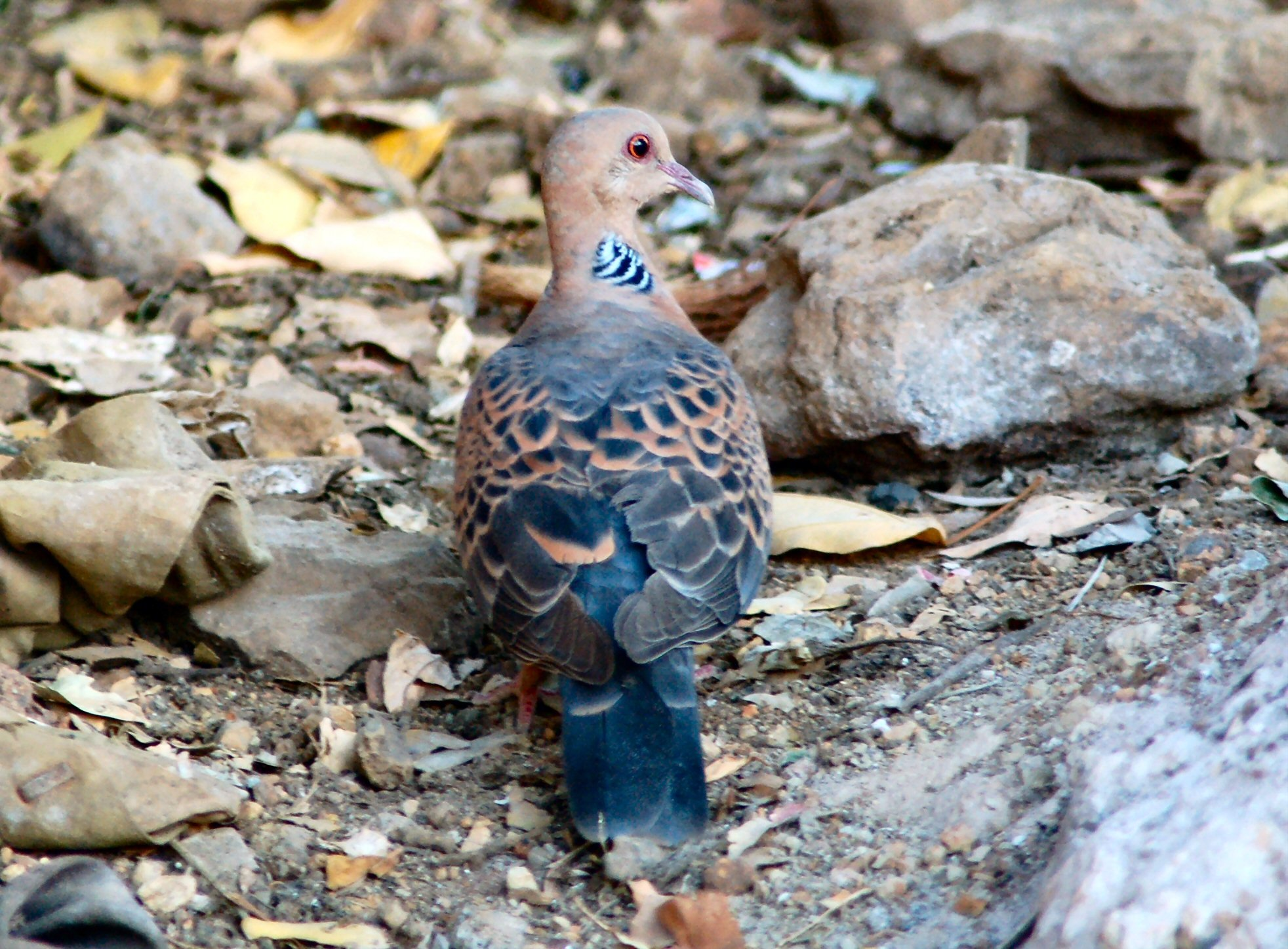
Oriental turtle doves forage on the ground for their food

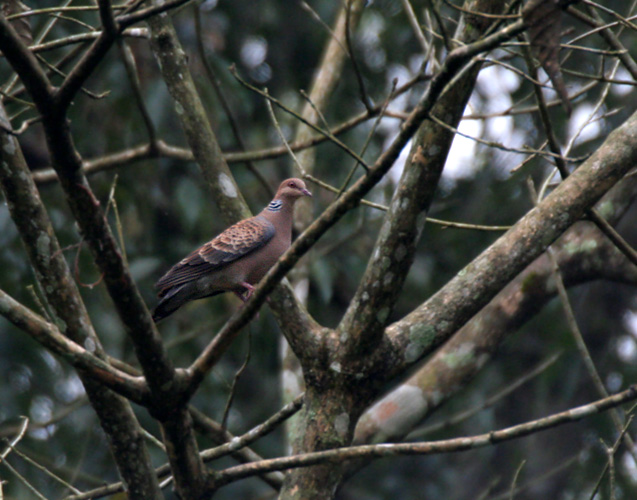
At Jayanti in Buxa Tiger Reserve in Jalpaiguri district of West Bengal, India

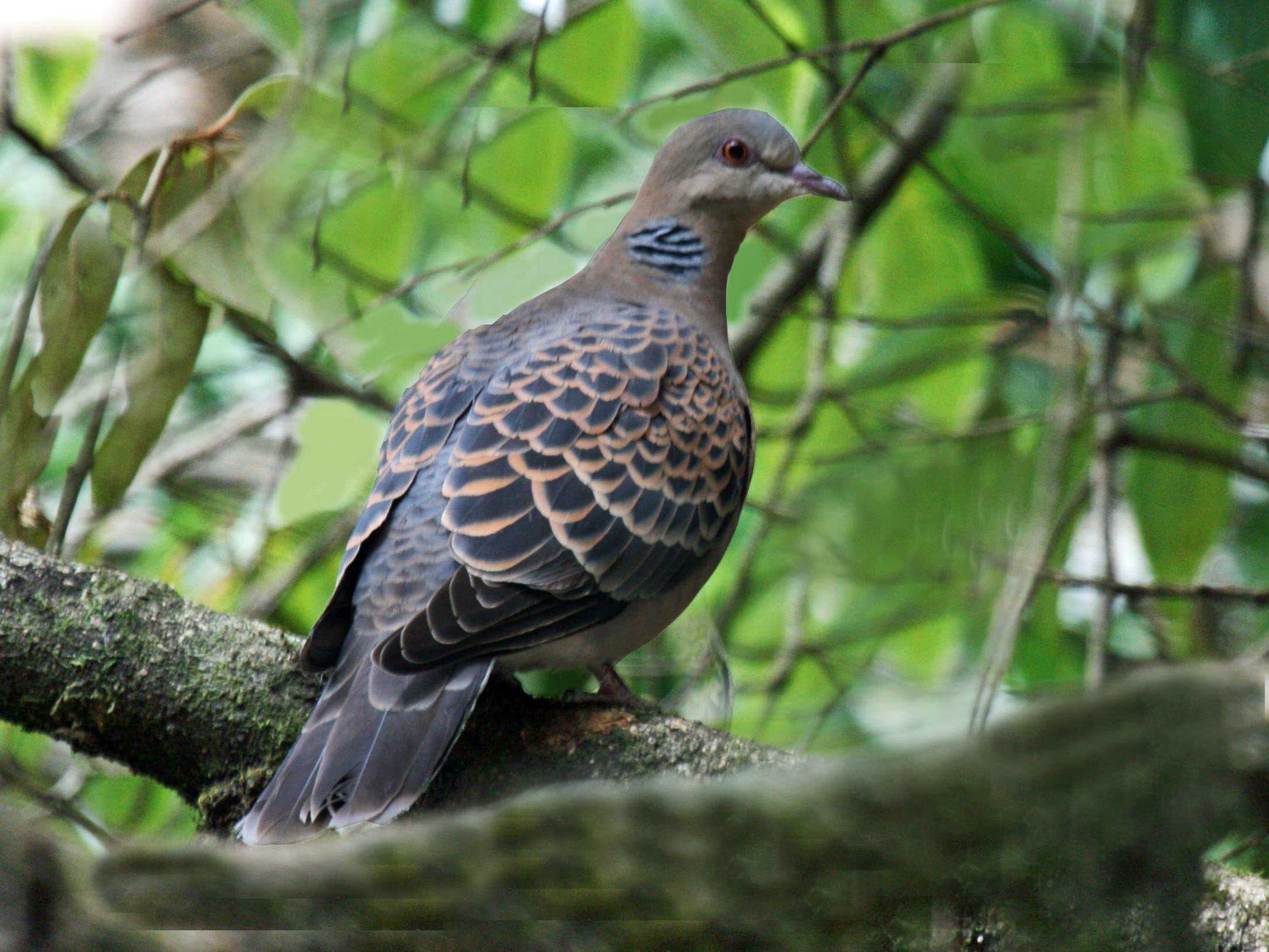
In Nepal

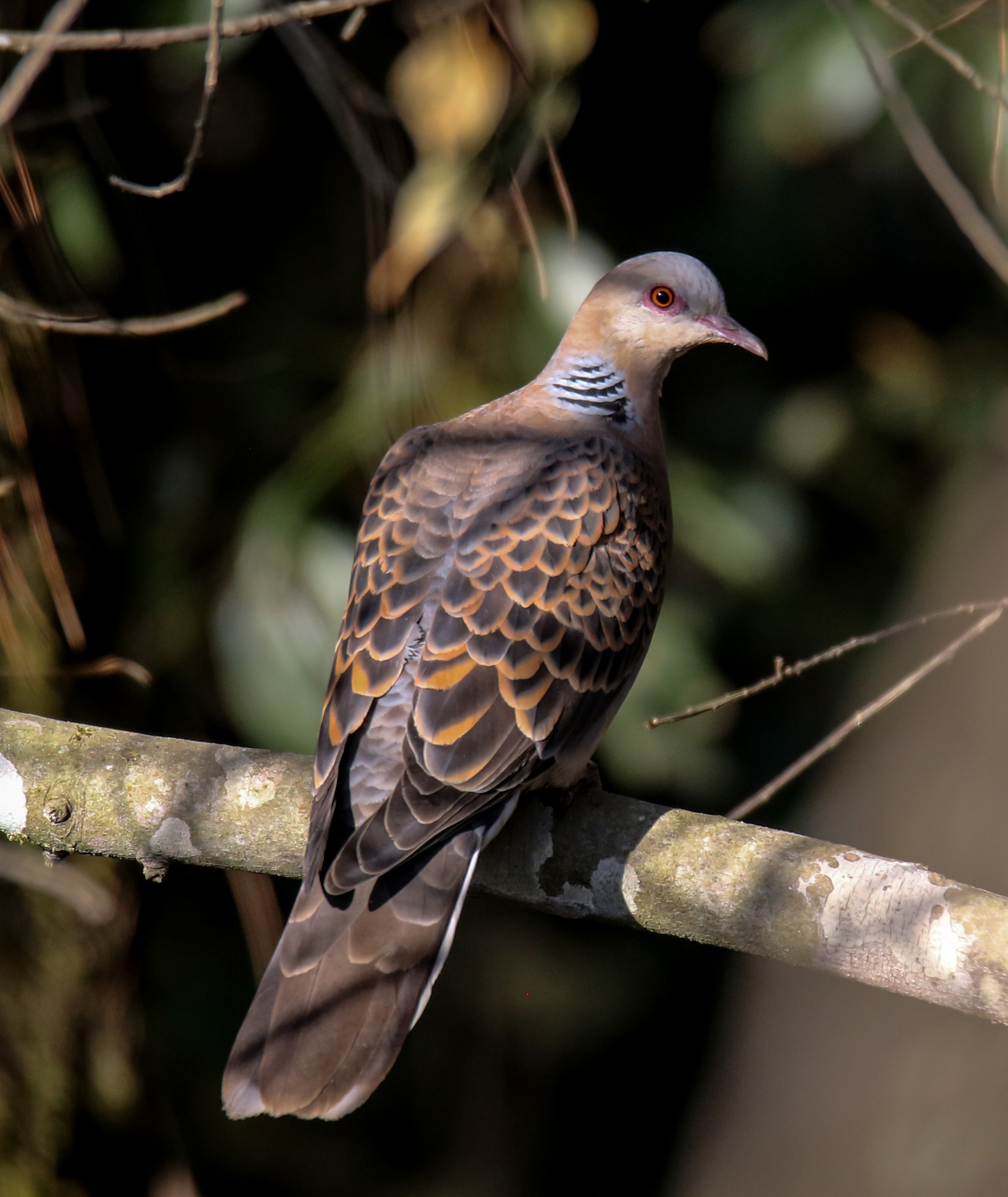
In Nepal

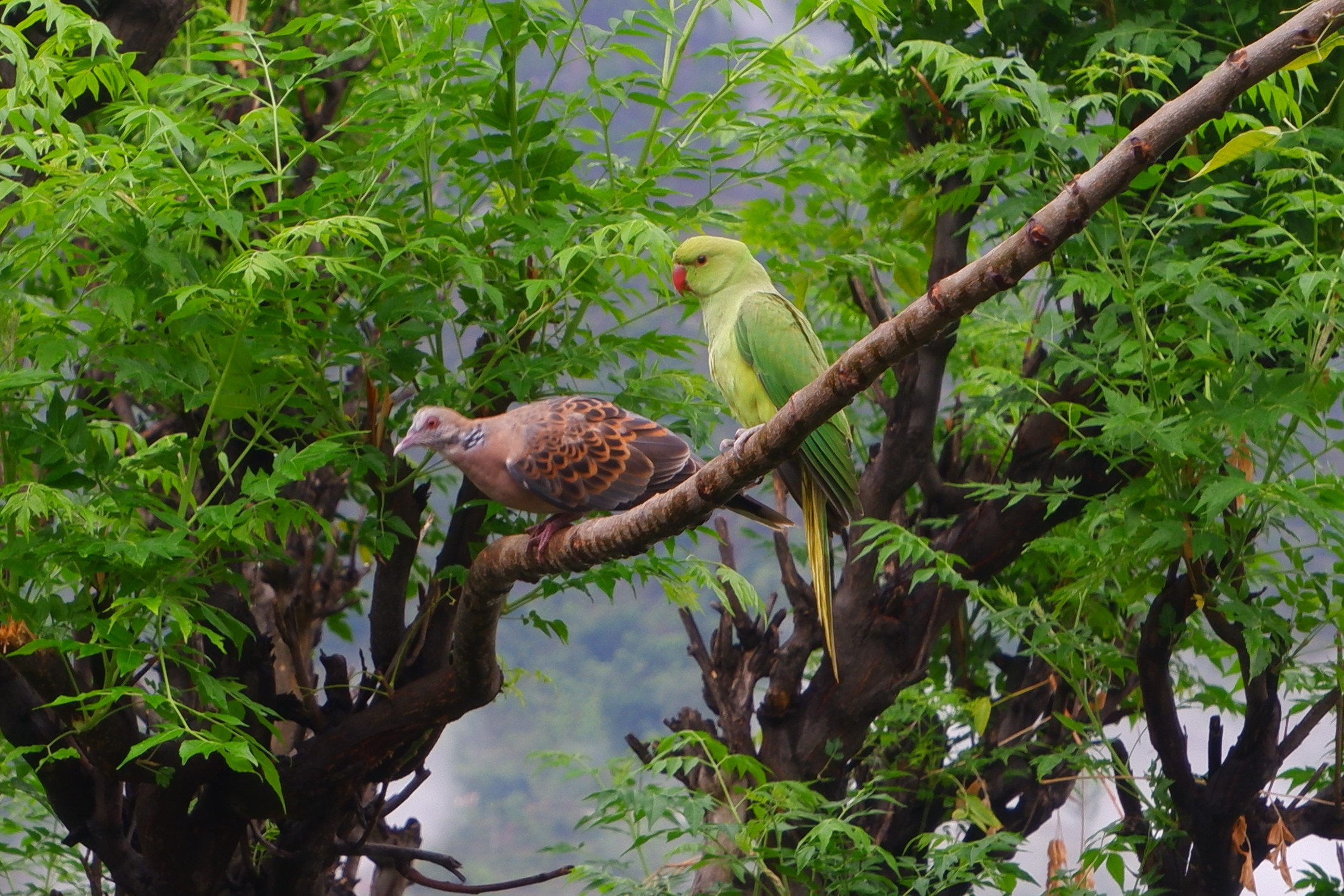
In Uttrakhand, India

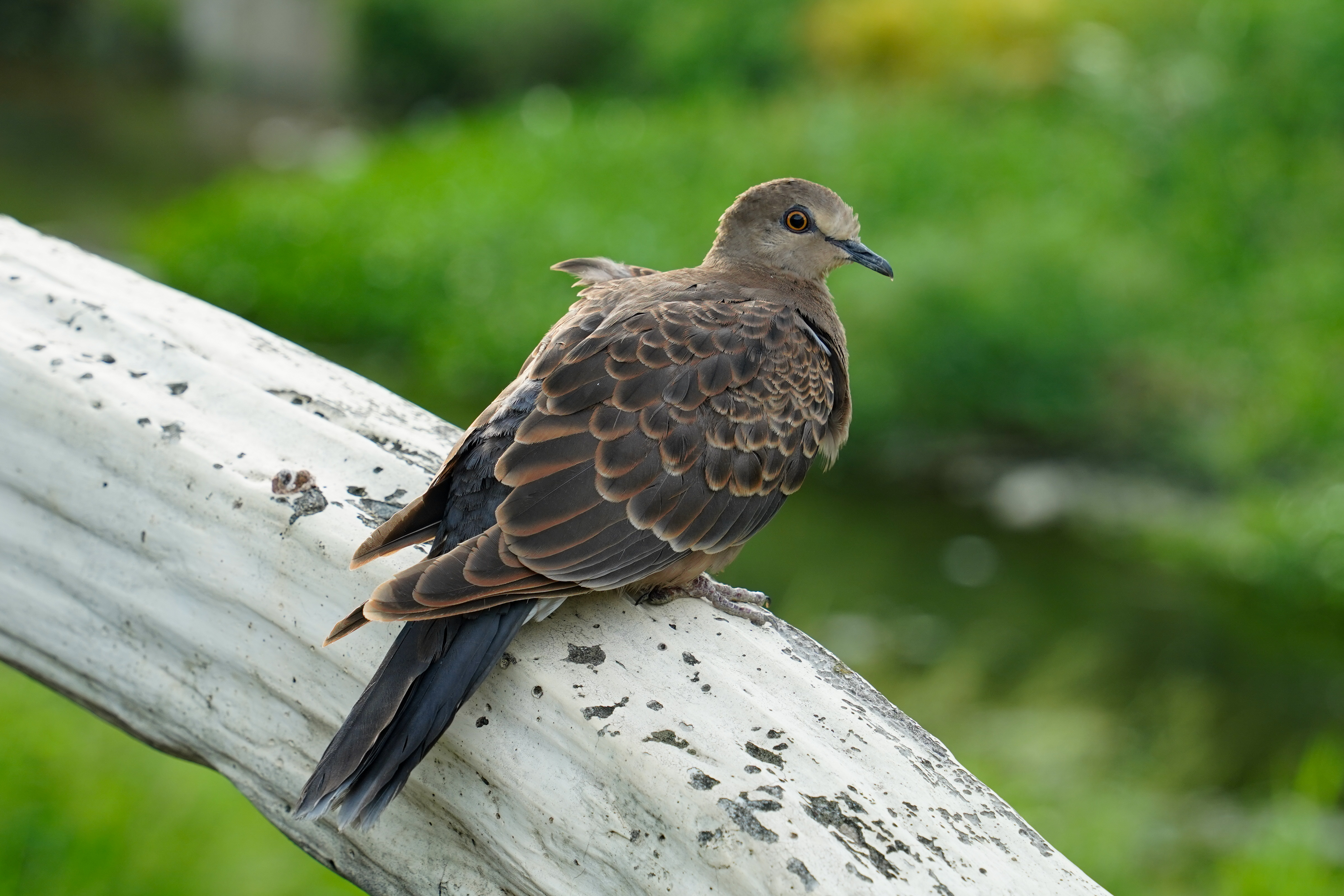
In Hsinchu City, Taiwan

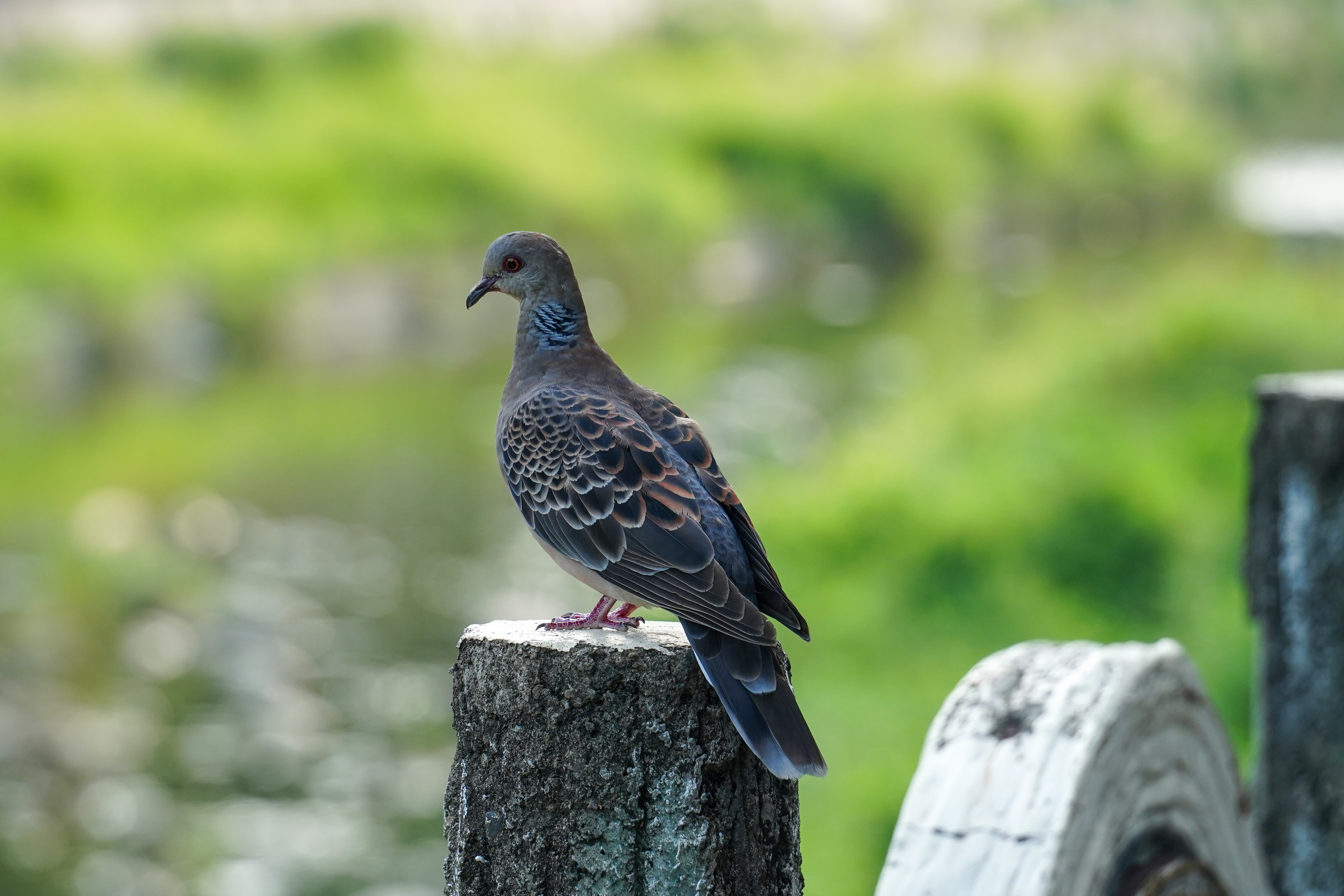
In Hsinchu City, Taiwan

== Bibliography ==
- "National Geographic" Field Guide to the Birds of North America ISBN
- Handbook of the Birds of the World Vol 4, Josep del Hoyo editor, ISBN
