= 2,3-dihydroxybenzoate 2,3-dioxygenase =

Class of enzymes

Identifiers
- EC no.: 1.13.11.28
- CAS no.: 56802-97-2

Databases
- IntEnz: IntEnz view
- BRENDA: BRENDA entry
- ExPASy: NiceZyme view
- KEGG: KEGG entry
- MetaCyc: metabolic pathway
- PRIAM: profile
- PDB structures: RCSB PDB PDBe PDBsum
- Gene Ontology: AmiGO / QuickGO
Search
- PMC: articles
- PubMed: articles
- NCBI: proteins

2,3-dihydroxybenzoate 2,3-dioxygenase (EC 1.13.11.28) is an enzyme that catalyzes the chemical reaction

2,3-Dihydroxybenzoic acid
O_{2}
2-carboxy-cis,cis-muconic acid

The two substrates of this enzyme are 2,3-dihydroxybenzoic acid and oxygen. Its product is 2-carboxy-cis,cis-muconic acid.

This enzyme belongs to the family of oxidoreductases, specifically those acting on single donors with O_{2} as oxidant and incorporation of two atoms of oxygen into the substrate (oxygenases). The oxygen incorporated need not be derived from O_{2}. The systematic name of this enzyme class is 2,3-dihydroxybenzoate:oxygen 2,3-oxidoreductase (decyclizing). This enzyme is also called 2,3-dihydroxybenzoate 2,3-oxygenase.
