= Kukoamines =

Kukoamine A
- Kukoamines 2D structure

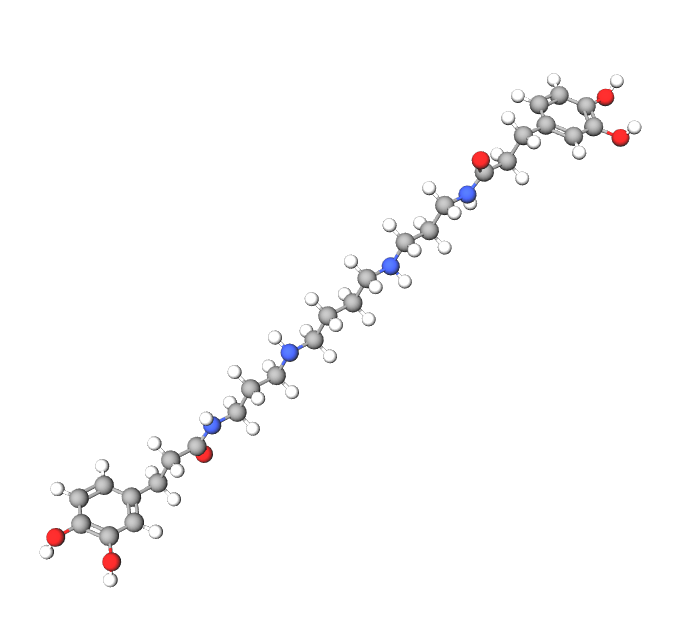
- Kukoamines 3D structure

Names
- Preferred IUPAC name 3-(3,4-Dihydroxyphenyl)-N-[3-[4-[3-[3-(3,4-dihydroxyphenyl)propanoylamino]propylamino]butylamino]propyl]propanamide
- Other names N(1),N(12)-bis(dihydrocaffeoyl)spermine; AC1NSXD9; BDBM50240622; DNC013917; C17615

Identifiers
CAS Number	75288-96-9
3D model (JSmol)	Interactive image
ChEBI	CHEBI:81220
ChEMBL	ChEMBL79129
ChemSpider	4477322
KEGG	C17615
PubChem CID	5318865
UNII	9YM64FBW2R
- InChI: InChI=1S/C28H42N4O6/c33-23-9-5-21(19-25(23)35)7-11-27(37)31-17-3-15-29-13-1-2-14-30-16-4-18-32-28(38)12-8-22-6-10-24(34)26(36)20-22/h5-6,9-10,19-20,29-30,33-36H,1-4,7-8,11-18H2,(H,31,37)(H,32,38) Key: IOLDDENZPBFBHV-UHFFFAOYSA-N
- SMILES: C1=CC(=C(C=C1CCC(=O)NCCCNCCCCNCCCNC(=O)CCC2=CC(=C(C=C2)O)O)O)O

Properties
Chemical formula	C_{28}H_{42}N_{4}O_{6}
Molar mass	530.666 g·mol^{−1}
- Except where otherwise noted, data are given for materials in their standard state (at 25 °C [77 °F], 100 kPa). Infobox references

Kukoamines are chemicals that are present in some plants including Lycium chinense, potatoes, and tomatoes. The most prevalent example is kukoamine A; others include kukoamine B, C, and D.

Chemically, kukoamines are catechols and also dihydrocaffeic acid derivatives of polyamines.
