= FAHD1 =

Protein-coding gene in the species Homo sapiens

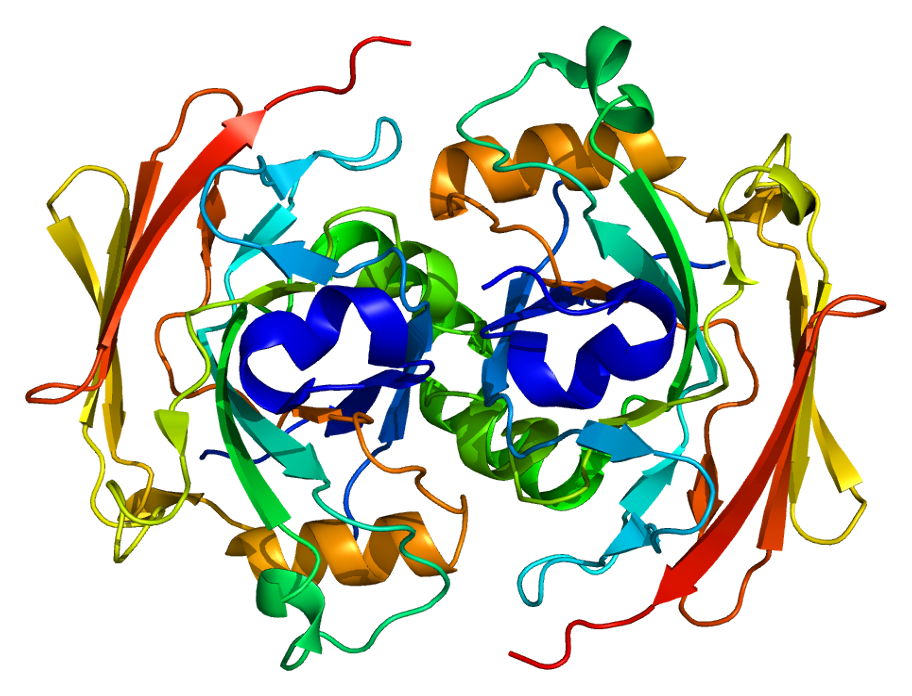

Identifiers
- Aliases: FAHD1, C16orf36, YISKL, fumarylacetoacetate hydrolase domain containing 1
- External IDs: OMIM: 616320; MGI: 1915886; GeneCards: FAHD1
Available structures
PDB	Ortholog search: PDBe RCSB
PDB	List of PDB id codes 1SAW
Enzyme activity
EC #	BRENDA	ExPASy	KEGG	MetaCyc
3.7.1.5	↗	↗	↗	↗
4.1.1.112	↗	↗	↗	↗
5.3.2.2	↗	↗	↗	↗

Gene location (Mouse)
Chr.	Chromosome 17 (mouse)
Band	17|17 A3.3	Start	25,067,866 bp
Band	17|17 A3.3	End	25,069,338 bp
RNA expression pattern
Bgee	Human / Mouse (ortholog); Top expressed in: pancreatic ductal cell; jejunal mucosa; endothelial cell; duodenum; kidney; renal medulla; vastus lateralis muscle; human penis; liver; right ventricle / Top expressed in: Ileal epithelium; right kidney; human kidney; cardiac muscle tissue of left ventricle; duodenum; extensor digitorum longus muscle; interventricular septum; jejunum; plantaris muscle; left lobe of liver; More reference expression data
BioGPS	n/a
Gene ontology
Molecular function	acetylpyruvate hydrolase activity; acylpyruvate hydrolase activity; catalytic activity; hydrolase activity; fumarylpyruvate hydrolase activity; metal ion binding; lyase activity; oxaloacetate decarboxylase activity
Cellular component	cytosol; mitochondrion; nucleoplasm; cytoplasm; mitochondrial matrix
Biological process	metabolism; tricarboxylic acid cycle
Sources:Amigo / QuickGO
Orthologs
Databases	NCBI: entry
Species	Human	Mouse
Entrez	81889	68636
Ensembl	n/a	ENSMUSG00000045316
UniProt	Q6P587	Q8R0F8
RefSeq (mRNA)	NM_031208; NM_001018104; NM_001142398	NM_023480
RefSeq (protein)	NP_001018114; NP_001135870; NP_112485	NP_075969
Location (UCSC)	n/a	Chr 17: 25.07 – 25.07 Mb
PubMed search
- Wikidata
View/Edit Human	View/Edit Mouse

Fumarylacetoacetate hydrolase domain-containing protein 1, also known as FLJ36880 protein, is an enzyme that in humans is encoded by the FAHD1 gene on chromosome 16.

== Structure ==
The FAHD1 gene encodes for a 24-kDa protein that is localized to the mitochondrion and belongs to the fumarylacetoacetate hydrolase family of proteins. The structure of FAHD1 has been resolved using X-ray crystallography at 2.2-Å resolution. The overall structure is similar to the C-terminal domain of the bifunctional enzyme HpcE from Escherichia coli C, fumarylacetoacetate hydrolase from Mus musculus and to YcgM (Apc5008) from E. coli 1262. A number of conserved amino acids including Asp-102 and Arg-106 of FAHD1 appear to be important for its catalytic activity.

== Function ==
The FAHD1 protein has been shown to function as an oxaloacetate decarboxylase in eukaryotes. The FAHD1 protein probably also functions as an acylpyruvase, having been shown to catalyze the hydrolysis of acetylpyruvate and fumarylpyruvate in in-vitro experiments. Mg(2+) was required for maximal enzyme activity.
