= (2,3-dihydroxybenzoyl)adenylate synthase =

InterPro Family

Identifiers
- EC no.: 2.7.7.58
- CAS no.: 122332-73-4

Databases
- IntEnz: IntEnz view
- BRENDA: BRENDA entry
- ExPASy: NiceZyme view
- KEGG: KEGG entry
- MetaCyc: metabolic pathway
- PRIAM: profile
- PDB structures: RCSB PDB PDBe PDBsum
- Gene Ontology: AmiGO / QuickGO
Search
- PMC: articles
- PubMed: articles
- NCBI: proteins

In enzymology, a (2,3-dihydroxybenzoyl)adenylate synthase (EC 2.7.7.58) is an enzyme that catalyzes the chemical reaction ATP + 2,3-dihydroxybenzoate $\rightleftharpoons$ diphosphate + (2,3-dihydroxybenzoyl)adenylate.

Thus, the two substrates of this enzyme are ATP and 2,3-dihydroxybenzoate, whereas its two products are diphosphate and (2,3-dihydroxybenzoyl)adenylate.

This enzyme belongs to the family of transferases, specifically those transferring phosphorus-containing nucleotide groups (nucleotidyltransferases). The systematic name of this enzyme class is ATP:2,3-dihydroxybenzoate adenylyltransferase. This enzyme is also called 2,3-dihydroxybenzoate-AMP ligase. This enzyme participates in biosynthesis of siderophore group nonribosomal.
