= Anthranilate 3-monooxygenase (deaminating) =

Enzyme class

Identifiers
- EC no.: 1.14.13.35
- CAS no.: 37256-68-1

Databases
- IntEnz: IntEnz view
- BRENDA: BRENDA entry
- ExPASy: NiceZyme view
- KEGG: KEGG entry
- MetaCyc: metabolic pathway
- PRIAM: profile
- PDB structures: RCSB PDB PDBe PDBsum
- Gene Ontology: AmiGO / QuickGO
Search
- PMC: articles
- PubMed: articles
- NCBI: proteins

Anthranilate 3-monooxygenase (deaminating) (EC 1.14.13.35) is an enzyme that catalyzes the chemical reaction

Anthranilic acid
+ NADP + H^{+}
O_{2}
NH_{3}
2,3-Dihydroxybenzoic acid
+ NADP^{+}

The four substrates of this enzyme are anthranilic acid, reduced nicotinamide adenine dinucleotide phosphate (NADPH), oxygen, and a proton. Its products are 2,3-dihydroxybenzoic acid, oxidised NADP^{+}, and ammonia.

This enzyme is an oxidoreductase, acting on paired donors, with molecular oxygen as oxidant and incorporation of one of atoms. The systematic name of this enzyme class is anthranilate,NADPH:oxygen oxidoreductase (3-hydroxylating, deaminating). Other names in common use include anthranilate hydroxylase, anthranilate 2,3-dioxygenase (deaminating), anthranilate hydroxylase (deaminating), anthranilic hydroxylase, and anthranilate 2,3-hydroxylase (deaminating). The enzyme isolated from Trichosporon cutaneum is a flavoprotein.
