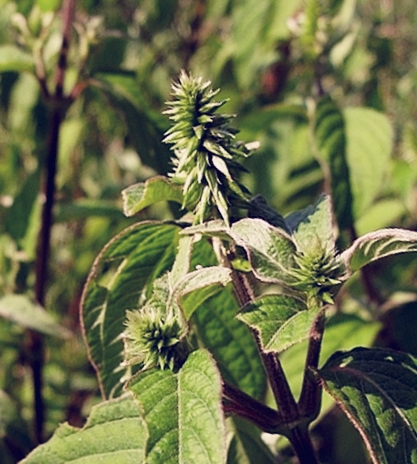

Scientific classification
- Kingdom: Plantae
- Clade: Tracheophytes
- Clade: Angiosperms
- Clade: Eudicots
- Order: Caryophyllales
- Family: Amaranthaceae
- Genus: Achyranthes
- Species: A. japonica

Binomial name
- Achyranthes japonica (Miq.) Nakai

= Achyranthes japonica =

Species of flowering plant

Achyranthes japonica, commonly known as Oriental chaff flower or Japanese chaff flower, is a perennial member of the genus Achyranthes in the family Amaranthaceae. It can be discovered on the roadside and its main distribution is in Korea and Japan.

== Ecology ==
A. japonica is a perennial plant growing to 50–150 cm (20–59 in) in height with thickened roots. Stems are quadrangular, branched, and glabrous or slightly pubescent. Stem nodes are dilated. The petiolate leaves are opposite, elliptic or oblong, and slightly pubescent, 10–20 cm (3.9–7.9 in) long and 4–10 cm (1.6–3.9 in) wide. Leaf veins show an arced pattern similar to that of dogwoods. Tiny green flowers bloom from August to September, with "bottle-brush" inflorescence spikes in axils and at terminals of the stem. Each flower has five fused stamens and a single pistil.

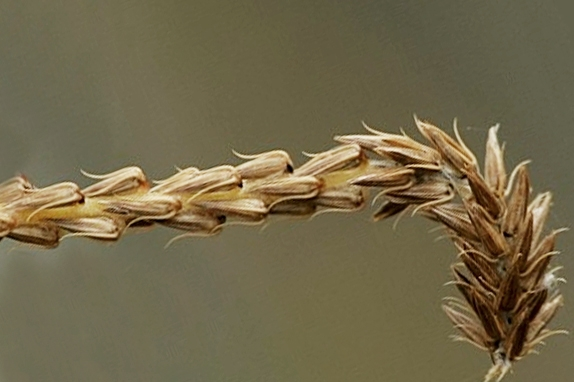
Achyranthes japonica fruits

Fruits are elliptic utricules, 2.5 mm (0.098 in), held tightly against the stem, with tiny branch-shaped bracts that easily stick to clothing.

Members of the genus Achyranthes in cultivation call for partial shade and rich, deep, well-drained soil, sandy and slightly acid. A. japonica grows in woody areas in lowlands and hills.

== Chemical compounds and traditional medicine ==
The root of the plant is used in the traditional medicine of Korea. Several chemical constituents have been isolated. The seeds contain various hormones, including ecdysterone, rubrosterone, and inokosterone. The roots contain triterpenoids and saponins. The plant provides the antioxidant protocatechuic acid.

== Status in United States ==
Achyranthes japonica is an introduced species in the United States. It was first reported in Kentucky in the 1980s, and by 2014 it was established in nine states of the Ohio River basin. As of 2025, the plant has been reported as far west as Missouri, as far south as Georgia, and as far east as Virginia.

== Bibliography ==
- Bown, Deni (2001). New Encyclopedia of Herbs & Their Uses (1st American ed.). London: DK Pub. ISBN 978-0789480316. "The Herb Society of America" on title page.
- World Health Organization, ed. (1998). Medicinal Plants in the Republic of Korea: Information on 150 Commonly Used Medicinal Plants. Manila: WHO Regional Office for the Western Pacific. Compiled by Natural Products Research Institute, Seoul National University. WHO Regional Publications Western Pacific Series no. 21.
