= Gentisate decarboxylase =

gentisate decarboxylase

Identifiers
- EC no.: 4.1.1.62
- CAS no.: 37290-54-3

Databases
- BRENDA: enzyme data
- ExPASy: NiceZyme view
- KEGG: enzyme entry
- MetaCyc: metabolic pathway
- Rhea: reactions
- PDB structures: RCSB PDB PDBe PDBsum
- Gene Ontology: AmiGO / QuickGO
Search
- PMC: articles
- PubMed: articles
- NCBI: proteins

Gentisate decarboxylase (EC 4.1.1.62) is an enzyme characterised from Klebsiella aerogenes that catalyzes the decarboxylation of gentisic acid to hydroquinone and carbon dioxide:

gentisic acid
CO_{2}
hydroquinone

The reaction is involved in plant-fungus responses in Populus species.

This enzyme is a lyase, specifically a carboxy-lyase, which cleave carbon-carbon bonds. The systematic name of this enzyme class is 2,5-dihydroxybenzoate carboxy-lyase (hydroquinone-forming). Other names in use include 2,5-dihydroxybenzoate decarboxylase, and gentisate carboxy-lyase.
