= O-pyrocatechuate decarboxylase =

Class of enzymes

o-pyrocatechuate decarboxylase

Identifiers
- EC no.: 4.1.1.46
- CAS no.: 37289-48-8

Databases
- BRENDA: enzyme data
- ExPASy: NiceZyme view
- KEGG: enzyme entry
- MetaCyc: metabolic pathway
- Rhea: reactions
- PDB structures: RCSB PDB PDBe PDBsum
- Gene Ontology: AmiGO / QuickGO
Search
- PMC: articles
- PubMed: articles
- NCBI: proteins

o-pyrocatechuate decarboxylase (EC 4.1.1.46) is an enzyme characterised from Aspergillus niger that catalyzes the decarboxylation of 2,3-dihydroxybenzoic acid to catechol and carbon dioxide:

2,3-dihydroxybenzoic acid
CO_{2}
catechol

The reaction is part of the catabolism of indole in fungi such as Aspergillus oryzae.

This enzyme is a lyase, specifically a carboxy-lyase, which cleave carbon-carbon bonds. The systematic name of this enzyme class is 2,3-dihydroxybenzoate carboxy-lyase (catechol-forming). This enzyme is also called 2,3-dihydroxybenzoate carboxy-lyase.
