= 3-hydroxybenzoate 4-monooxygenase =

Class of enzymes

Identifiers
- EC no.: 1.14.13.23
- CAS no.: 37256-76-1

Databases
- BRENDA: enzyme data
- ExPASy: NiceZyme view
- KEGG: enzyme entry
- MetaCyc: metabolic pathway
- Rhea: reactions
- PDB structures: RCSB PDB PDBe PDBsum
- Gene Ontology: AmiGO / QuickGO
Search
- PMC: articles
- PubMed: articles
- NCBI: proteins

3-hydroxybenzoate 4-monooxygenase (EC 1.14.13.23) is an enzyme that catalyzes the chemical reaction

3-Hydroxybenzoic acid
+ NADPH + H^{+}
O_{2}
H_{2}O
Protocatechuic acid
+ NADP^{+}

The foursubstrates of this enzyme are 3-hydroxybenzoic acid, reduced nicotinamide adenine dinucleotide phosphate (NADPH), oxygen, and a proton. Its products are protocatechuic acid, oxidised NADP^{+}, and water.

The enzyme is a flavin-containing monooxygenase that uses molecular oxygen as oxidant and incorporates one of its atoms into the starting material. The systematic name of this enzyme class is 3-hydroxybenzoate,NADPH:oxygen oxidoreductase (4-hydroxylating). It is also called 3-hydroxybenzoate 4-hydroxylase. It participates in benzoate degradation via hydroxylation and uses flavin adenine dinucleotide as a cofactor.

== Structural studies ==
As of late 2007, two structures have been solved for this class of enzymes, with PDB accession codes PDB: 2DKH and PDB: 2DKI.
