= Bilobol =

Names
- Preferred IUPAC name 5-[(8Z)-Pentadec-8-enyl]benzene-1,3-diol
- Other names 5-[(Z)-Pentadec-8-en-1-yl]resorcinol; 5-Pentadecenylresorcinol

Identifiers
CAS Number	22910-86-7
3D model (JSmol)	Interactive image; Interactive image
ChemSpider	4445147
PubChem CID	5281852
UNII	NSK9KWM3T6
CompTox Dashboard (EPA)	DTXSID90872874
- InChI: InChI=1S/C21H34O2/c1-2-3-4-5-6-7-8-9-10-11-12-13-14-15-19-16-20(22)18-21(23)17-19/h7-8,16-18,22-23H,2-6,9-15H2,1H3/b8-7- Key: TUGAUFMQYWZJAB-FPLPWBNLSA-N; InChI=1/C21H34O2/c1-2-3-4-5-6-7-8-9-10-11-12-13-14-15-19-16-20(22)18-21(23)17-19/h7-8,16-18,22-23H,2-6,9-15H2,1H3/b8-7- Key: TUGAUFMQYWZJAB-FPLPWBNLBC
- SMILES: Oc1cc(cc(O)c1)CCCCCCC\C=C/CCCCCC; CCCCCCC=CCCCCCCCC1=CC(=CC(=C1)O)O

Properties
Chemical formula	C_{21}H_{34}O_{2}
Molar mass	318.501 g·mol^{−1}
- Except where otherwise noted, data are given for materials in their standard state (at 25 °C [77 °F], 100 kPa). Infobox references

Bilobol is an alkylresorcinol from Ginkgo biloba. Chemically, it is similar in structure to urushiol, the irritant found in poison ivy; it is a strong skin irritant itself.

== Natural occurrences ==
Bilobol can be found in Ginkgo biloba fruits.
