= Protocatechuate 3,4-dioxygenase =

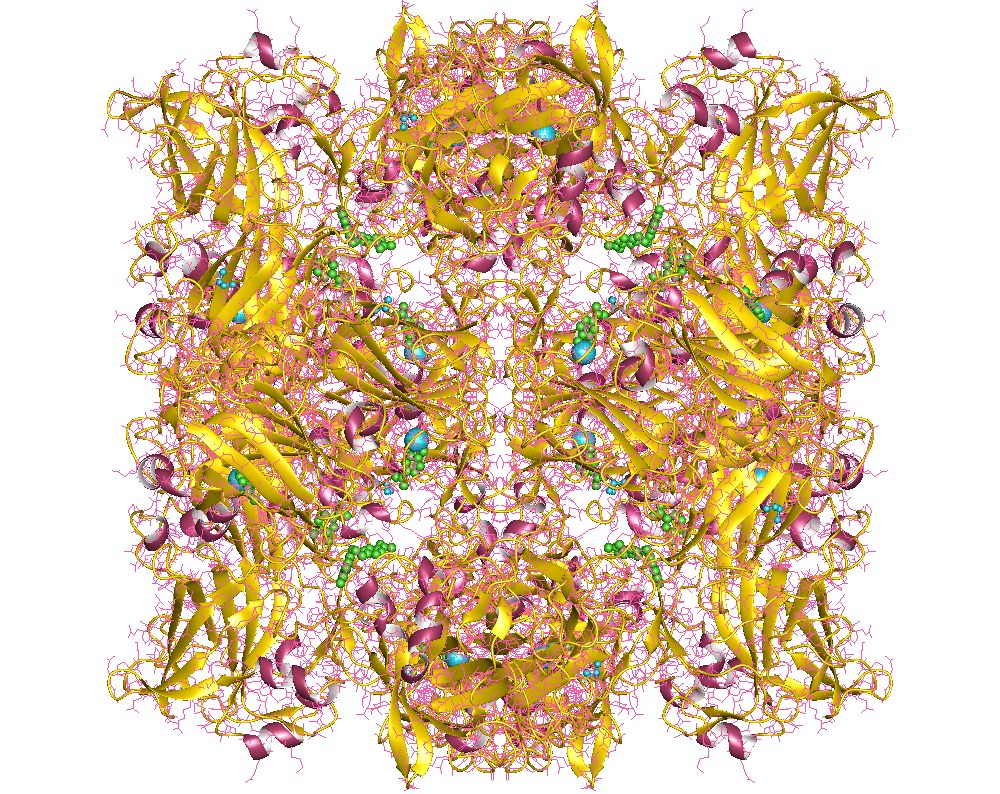
- Protocatechuate 3,4-dioxygenase hetero24mer, Pseudomonas putida

Identifiers
- EC no.: 1.13.11.3
- CAS no.: 9029-47-4

Databases
- IntEnz: IntEnz view
- BRENDA: BRENDA entry
- ExPASy: NiceZyme view
- KEGG: KEGG entry
- MetaCyc: metabolic pathway
- PRIAM: profile
- PDB structures: RCSB PDB PDBe PDBsum
- Gene Ontology: AmiGO / QuickGO
Search
- PMC: articles
- PubMed: articles
- NCBI: proteins

Protocatechuate 3,4-dioxygenase (EC 1.13.11.3) is an enzyme that catalyzes the chemical reaction

protocatechuic acid
O_{2}
3-carboxy-cis,cis-muconic acid

The two substrates of this enzyme are protocatechuic acid and oxygen. Its product is 3-carboxy-cis,cis-muconic acid.

This enzyme belongs to the family of oxidoreductases, specifically those acting on single donors with O_{2} as oxidant and incorporation of two atoms of oxygen into the substrate (oxygenases). The systematic name of this enzyme class is protocatechuate:oxygen 3,4-oxidoreductase (decyclizing). Other names in common use include protocatechuate oxygenase, protocatechuic acid oxidase, protocatechuic 3,4-dioxygenase, and protocatechuic 3,4-oxygenase. This enzyme participates in benzoate degradation via hydroxylation and 2,4-dichlorobenzoate degradation. It employs one cofactor, iron.

This enzyme has been found effective at improving organic fluorophore-stability in single-molecule experiments. Commercial preps of the enzyme isolated from Pseudomonas spp. generally require further purification to remove strong contaminating nuclease activity.

== Structural studies ==
As of late 2007, 37 structures have been solved for this class of enzymes, with PDB accession codes 1EO2, 1EO9, 1EOA, 1EOB, 1EOC, 1YKK, 1YKL, 1YKM, 1YKN, 1YKO, 1YKP, 2BUM, 2BUQ, 2BUR, 2BUT, 2BUU, 2BUV, 2BUW, 2BUX, 2BUY, 2BUZ, 2BV0, 2PCD, 3PCA, 3PCB, 3PCC, 3PCD, 3PCE, 3PCF, 3PCG, 3PCH, 3PCI, 3PCJ, 3PCK, 3PCL, 3PCM, and 3PCN.
