= 4-sulfobenzoate 3,4-dioxygenase =

Class of enzymes

Identifiers
- EC no.: 1.14.12.8
- CAS no.: 122933-81-7

Databases
- BRENDA: enzyme data
- ExPASy: NiceZyme view
- KEGG: enzyme entry
- MetaCyc: metabolic pathway
- Rhea: reactions
- PDB structures: RCSB PDB PDBe PDBsum
- Gene Ontology: AmiGO / QuickGO
Search
- PMC: articles
- PubMed: articles
- NCBI: proteins

4-sulfobenzoate 3,4-dioxygenase (EC 1.14.12.8) is an enzyme originally obtained from Comamonas testosteroni that catalyzes the chemical reaction

4-sulfobenzoic acid
+ NADH
O_{2} + H^{+}
protocatechuic acid
+ NAD^{+} + H_{2}SO_{3}

The four substrates of this enzyme are 4-sulfobenzoic acid, reduced nicotinamide adenine dinucleotide (NADH), oxygen and a proton. Its products are protocatechuic acid (3,4-dihydroxybenzoic acid), NAD^{+}, and sulfurous acid.

This enzyme is an oxidoreductase, which uses molecular oxygen as oxidant and incorporates its atoms into the starting material. The systematic name of this enzyme class is 4-sulfobenzoate,NADH:oxygen oxidoreductase (3,4-hydroxylating, sulfite-forming). Other names in common use include 4-sulfobenzoate dioxygenase, and 4-sulfobenzoate 3,4-dioxygenase system. It participates in toluene degradation and is an iron–sulfur protein that uses flavin mononucleotide as a cofactor.
