= 3,4-dihydroxyphthalate decarboxylase =

Class of enzymes

Identifiers
- EC no.: 4.1.1.69
- CAS no.: 83137-76-2

Databases
- BRENDA: enzyme data
- ExPASy: NiceZyme view
- KEGG: enzyme entry
- MetaCyc: metabolic pathway
- Rhea: reactions
- PDB structures: RCSB PDB PDBe PDBsum
- Gene Ontology: AmiGO / QuickGO
Search
- PMC: articles
- PubMed: articles
- NCBI: proteins

3,4-dihydroxyphthalate decarboxylase (EC 4.1.1.69) is an enzyme characterised from a Micrococcus species that catalyzes the decarboxylation of 3,4-dihydroxyphthalic acid to protocatechuic acid and carbon dioxide:

3,4-dihydroxyphthalic acid
CO_{2}
protocatechuic acid

The enzyme has been of interest as it is involved in pathways that can transform lignin into useful small molecules.

This enzyme is a lyase, specifically a carboxy-lyase, which cleave carbon-carbon bonds. The systematic name of this enzyme class is 3,4-dihydroxyphthalate carboxy-lyase (3,4-dihydroxybenzoate-forming). This enzyme is also called 3,4-dihydroxyphthalate carboxy-lyase.
