= Terephthalate 1,2-cis-dihydrodiol dehydrogenase =

terephthalate 1,2-cis-dihydrodiol dehydrogenase

Identifiers
- EC no.: 1.3.1.61

Databases
- IntEnz: IntEnz view
- BRENDA: BRENDA entry
- ExPASy: NiceZyme view
- KEGG: KEGG entry
- MetaCyc: metabolic pathway
- PRIAM: profile
- PDB structures: RCSB PDB PDBe PDBsum
- Gene Ontology: AmiGO / QuickGO
Search
- PMC: articles
- PubMed: articles
- NCBI: proteins

In enzymology, a terephthalate 1,2-cis-dihydrodiol dehydrogenase (EC 1.3.1.61) is an enzyme that catalyzes the chemical reaction:

cis-4,5-dihydroxycyclohexa-1(6),2-diene-1,4-dicarboxylate + NAD^{+} $\rightleftharpoons$ 3,4-dihydroxybenzoate + CO_{2} + NADH

Thus, the two substrates of this enzyme are cis-4,5-dihydroxycyclohexa-1(6),2-diene-1,4-dicarboxylate and NAD^{+}, whereas its 3 products are 3,4-dihydroxybenzoate, CO_{2}, and NADH.

This enzyme belongs to the family of oxidoreductases, specifically those acting on the CH-CH group of donor with NAD+ or NADP+ as acceptor. The systematic name of this enzyme class is cis-4,5-dihydroxycyclohexa-1(6),2-diene-1,4-dicarboxylate:NAD+ oxidoreductase (decarboxylating). This enzyme participates in 2,4-dichlorobenzoate degradation.
