= 3-fumarylpyruvate hydrolase =

Class of enzymes

3-Fumarylpyruvate hydrolase

Identifiers
- EC no.: 3.7.1.20

Databases
- IntEnz: IntEnz view
- BRENDA: BRENDA entry
- ExPASy: NiceZyme view
- KEGG: KEGG entry
- MetaCyc: metabolic pathway
- PRIAM: profile
- PDB structures: RCSB PDB PDBe PDBsum
Search
- PMC: articles
- PubMed: articles
- NCBI: proteins

3-Fumarylpyruvate hydrolase (EC 3.7.1.20, nagK (gene), naaD (gene)) is an enzyme with systematic name 3-fumarylpyruvate hydrolyase. This enzyme catalyses the following chemical reaction

3-Fumarylpyruvic acid
H_{2}O
Fumaric acid
+
Pyruvic acid

The enzyme is involved in bacterial degradation of 5-substituted salicylates.
