= (3S,4R)-3,4-dihydroxycyclohexa-1,5-diene-1,4-dicarboxylate dehydrogenase =

Enzyme

Identifiers
- EC no.: 1.3.1.53
- CAS no.: 162032-77-1

Databases
- IntEnz: IntEnz view
- BRENDA: BRENDA entry
- ExPASy: NiceZyme view
- KEGG: KEGG entry
- MetaCyc: metabolic pathway
- PRIAM: profile
- PDB structures: RCSB PDB PDBe PDBsum
- Gene Ontology: AmiGO / QuickGO
Search
- PMC: articles
- PubMed: articles
- NCBI: proteins

In enzymology, (3S,4R)-3,4-dihydroxycyclohexa-1,5-diene-1,4-dicarboxylate dehydrogenase (EC 1.3.1.53) is an enzyme that catalyzes the chemical reaction

3,4-dihydroxycyclohexa-1,5-diene-1,4-dicarboxylic acid
+ NAD^{+}
CO_{2} + H^{+}
CO_{2} + H^{+}
protocatechuic acid
+ NADH

The two substrates of this enzyme are (3S,4R)-3,4-dihydroxycyclohexa-1,5-diene-1,4-dicarboxylate and oxidised nicotinamide adenine dinucleotide (NAD^{+}). Its products are protocatechuic acid, carbon dioxide, reduced NADH and a proton.

This enzyme is a part of the terephthalate degradation pathway in bacteria.

== Family ==
This enzyme belongs to the family of oxidoreductases, specifically those acting on the CH-CH group of donor with NAD+ or NADP+ as acceptor. The systematic name of this enzyme class is (3S,4R)-3,4-dihydroxycyclohexa-1,5-diene-1,4-dicarboxylate:NAD+ oxidoreductase. Another name in common use is (1R,2S)-dihydroxy-3,5-cyclohexadiene-1,4-dicarboxylate dehydrogenase. This enzyme uses ferrous iron as a cofactor.
