= Vanillate monooxygenase =

Class of enzymes

Identifiers
- EC no.: 1.14.13.82
- CAS no.: 39307-11-4

Databases
- IntEnz: IntEnz view
- BRENDA: BRENDA entry
- ExPASy: NiceZyme view
- KEGG: KEGG entry
- MetaCyc: metabolic pathway
- PRIAM: profile
- PDB structures: RCSB PDB PDBe PDBsum
- Gene Ontology: AmiGO / QuickGO
Search
- PMC: articles
- PubMed: articles
- NCBI: proteins

Vanillate monooxygenase (EC 1.14.13.82) is an enzyme that catalyzes the chemical reaction

vanillic acid
+ NADH + H^{+}
O_{2}
H_{2}O
protocatechuic acid
+ NAD^{+} + H_{2}C=O

The four substrates of this enzyme are vanillic acid, reduced nicotinamide adenine dinucleotide (NADH), oxygen, and a proton. Its products are protocatechuic acid, oxidised NAD^{+}, water, and formaldehyde.

This enzyme is an oxidoreductase, acting on paired donors, with molecular oxygen as oxidant and incorporating one of its atoms. The systematic name of this enzyme class is vanillate:oxygen oxidoreductase (demethylating). Other names in common use include 4-hydroxy-3-methoxybenzoate demethylase, and vanillate demethylase. This enzyme participates in vanillin degradation in Pseudomonas bacteria.
