= Maleylpyruvate isomerase =

Class of enzymes

Identifiers
- EC no.: 5.2.1.4
- CAS no.: 9023-77-2

Databases
- IntEnz: IntEnz view
- BRENDA: BRENDA entry
- ExPASy: NiceZyme view
- KEGG: KEGG entry
- MetaCyc: metabolic pathway
- PRIAM: profile
- PDB structures: RCSB PDB PDBe PDBsum
- Gene Ontology: AmiGO / QuickGO
Search
- PMC: articles
- PubMed: articles
- NCBI: proteins

Maleylpyruvate isomerase (EC 5.2.1.4) is an enzyme that catalyzes the chemical reaction

3-Maleylpyruvic acid
3-Fumarylpyruvic acid

The enzyme has one substrate, 3-maleylpyruvic acid, which it converts to its geometric isomer, 3-fumarylpyruvic acid.

This enzyme belongs to the family of isomerases, specifically cis-trans isomerases. The systematic name of this enzyme class is 3-maleylpyruvate cis-trans-isomerase. This enzyme participates in tyrosine metabolism.

== Structural studies ==
As of late 2007, two structures have been solved for this class of enzymes, with PDB accession codes 2NSF and 2NSG.
