= 2-oxo-3-(5-oxofuran-2-ylidene)propanoate lactonase =

Class of enzymes

Identifiers
- EC no.: 3.1.1.91

Databases
- BRENDA: enzyme data
- ExPASy: NiceZyme view
- KEGG: enzyme entry
- MetaCyc: metabolic pathway
- Rhea: reactions
- PDB structures: RCSB PDB PDBe PDBsum
Search
- PMC: articles
- PubMed: articles
- NCBI: proteins

The enzyme 2-oxo-3-(5-oxofuran-2-ylidene)propanoate lactonase (EC 3.1.1.91, naaC (gene); systematic name 2-oxo-3-(5-oxofuran-2-ylidene)propanoate lactonohydrolase) catalyses the reaction

2-oxo-3-(5-oxofuran-2-ylidene)propanoic acid
H_{2}O
3-maleylpyruvic acid

The enzyme characterised from Bradyrhizobium sp. JS329 hydrolyses the lactone, 2-oxo-3-(5-oxofuran-2-ylidene)propanoic acid, to 3-maleylpyruvic acid. This is a step in the degradation pathway of 5-nitroanthranilic acid in this bacterium.
