= Carboxy-cis,cis-muconate cyclase =

Class of enzymes

Identifiers
- EC no.: 5.5.1.5
- CAS no.: 37318-55-1

Databases
- IntEnz: IntEnz view
- BRENDA: BRENDA entry
- ExPASy: NiceZyme view
- KEGG: KEGG entry
- MetaCyc: metabolic pathway
- PRIAM: profile
- PDB structures: RCSB PDB PDBe PDBsum
- Gene Ontology: AmiGO / QuickGO
Search
- PMC: articles
- PubMed: articles
- NCBI: proteins

Carboxy-cis,cis-muconate cyclase (EC 5.5.1.5) is an enzyme that catalyzes the chemical reaction

2-(carboxymethyl)-5-oxo-2,5-dihydro-3-furoic acid
3-carboxy-cis,cis-muconic acid

The enzyme has one substrate, 2-(carboxymethyl)-5-oxo-2,5-dihydro-3-furoic acid, which is converted to 3-carboxy-cis,cis-muconic acid.

This enzyme belongs to the family of isomerases, specifically the class of intramolecular lyases. The systematic name of this enzyme class is 3-carboxy-2,5-dihydro-5-oxofuran-2-acetate lyase (decyclizing). This enzyme is also called 3-carboxymuconate cyclase. This enzyme participates in benzoate degradation via hydroxylation.

== Structural studies ==
As of late 2007, only one structure has been solved for this class of enzymes, with the PDB accession code 1JOF.
