= DB-2073 =

Names
- Preferred IUPAC name 2-Hexyl-5-propylbenzene-1,3-diol
- Other names 2-n-Hexyl-5-n-propylresorcinol

Identifiers
CAS Number	39341-78-1
3D model (JSmol)	Interactive image
ChemSpider	170764
PubChem CID	197183
UNII	E3BW82CH2T
CompTox Dashboard (EPA)	DTXSID10192566
- InChI: InChI=1S/C15H24O2/c1-3-5-6-7-9-13-14(16)10-12(8-4-2)11-15(13)17/h10-11,16-17H,3-9H2,1-2H3 Key: VERGPVBZPMTZDY-UHFFFAOYSA-N
- SMILES: Oc1cc(cc(O)c1CCCCCC)CCC

Properties
Chemical formula	C_{15}H_{24}O_{2}
Molar mass	236.355 g·mol^{−1}
- Except where otherwise noted, data are given for materials in their standard state (at 25 °C [77 °F], 100 kPa). Infobox references

DB-2073 is a dialkylresorcinol antibiotic isolated from the broth culture of Pseudomonas sp B-9004.
