= 4,5-dihydroxyphthalate decarboxylase =

Class of enzymes

Identifiers
- EC no.: 4.1.1.55
- CAS no.: 37290-48-5

Databases
- BRENDA: enzyme data
- ExPASy: NiceZyme view
- KEGG: enzyme entry
- MetaCyc: metabolic pathway
- Rhea: reactions
- PDB structures: RCSB PDB PDBe PDBsum
- Gene Ontology: AmiGO / QuickGO
Search
- PMC: articles
- PubMed: articles
- NCBI: proteins

The enzyme 4,5-dihydroxyphthalate decarboxylase (EC 4.1.1.55), characterised from Pseudomonas species, catalyzes the decarboxylation of 4,5-dihydroxyphthalic acid to 3,4-dihydroxybenzoic acid (protocatechuic acid) and carbon dioxide:

4,5-dihydroxyphthalic acid
CO_{2}
protocatechuic acid

The reaction is part of a pathway that removes phthalic acid and its esters from the environment. The enzyme has been of interest as part of processes to convert lignin into useful small molecules.

This enzyme is a lyase, specifically a carboxy-lyase, which cleave carbon-carbon bonds. The systematic name of this enzyme class is 4,5-dihydroxyphthalate carboxy-lyase (3,4-dihydroxybenzoate-forming). This enzyme is also called 4,5-dihydroxyphthalate carboxy-lyase.
