= Protocatechuate decarboxylase =

Class of enzymes

Identifiers
- EC no.: 4.1.1.63
- CAS no.: 37290-55-4

Databases
- BRENDA: enzyme data
- ExPASy: NiceZyme view
- KEGG: enzyme entry
- MetaCyc: metabolic pathway
- Rhea: reactions
- PDB structures: RCSB PDB PDBe PDBsum
- Gene Ontology: AmiGO / QuickGO
Search
- PMC: articles
- PubMed: articles
- NCBI: proteins

Protocatechuate decarboxylase (EC 4.1.1.63) is an enzyme characterised from Klebsiella aerogenes that catalyzes the decarboxylation of protocatechuic acid to catechol and carbon dioxide:

protocatechuic acid
CO_{2}
catechol

Metabolic engineering of the enzyme has been of interest in a pathway for industrial synthesis of aromatic comounds and the polymer component, adipic acid, via muconic acid.

This enzyme is a lyases, specifically a carboxy-lyase, which cleave carbon-carbon bonds. The systematic name of this enzyme class is 3,4-dihydroxybenzoate carboxy-lyase (catechol-forming). Other names in use include 3,4-dihydroxybenzoate decarboxylase, and protocatechuate carboxy-lyase.
