= 3-Fumarylpyruvic acid =

Names
- Preferred IUPAC name (2E)-4,6-Dioxohept-2-enedioic acid
- Other names (E)-4,6-Dioxohept-2-enedioic acid

Identifiers
CAS Number	75164-74-8
3D model (JSmol)	Interactive image
ChEBI	CHEBI:1506
ChemSpider	4444156
KEGG	C02514
PubChem CID	5280525
UNII	454MG36A86
CompTox Dashboard (EPA)	DTXSID801031876
- InChI: InChI=1S/C7H6O6/c8-4(1-2-6(10)11)3-5(9)7(12)13/h1-2H,3H2,(H,10,11)(H,12,13)/b2-1+ Key: AZCFLHZUFANAOR-OWOJBTEDSA-N
- SMILES: OC(=O)\C=C\C(=O)CC(=O)C(O)=O

Properties
Chemical formula	C_{7}H_{6}O_{6}
Molar mass	186.119 g·mol^{−1}
- Except where otherwise noted, data are given for materials in their standard state (at 25 °C [77 °F], 100 kPa). Infobox references

3-Fumarylpyruvic acid, or 3-fumarylpyruvate, is a dicarboxylic acid formed from the isomerisation of 3-maleylpyruvate by maleylpyruvate isomerase. It is converted into fumaric and pyruvic acids by 3-fumarylpyruvate hydrolase.

== Biosynthesis ==
3-Fumarylpyruvic acid is an intermediate in the metabolism of the amino acid tyrosine in some organisms. At an earlier stage, in the presence of the enzyme gentisate 1,2-dioxygenase and oxygen, gentisic acid undergoes a ring-opening reaction to give 3-maleylpyruvic acid: This is converted to its geometric isomer by the enzyme maleylpyruvate isomerase.

Gentisic acid
O_{2}
3-Maleylpyruvic acid
3-Fumarylpyruvic acid

== Metabolism ==
The metabolism of 3-fumarylpyruvic acid by the enzyme 3-fumarylpyruvate hydrolase involves its cleavage into fumaric and pyruvic acids.

3-Fumarylpyruvic acid
H_{2}O
Fumaric acid
+
Pyruvic acid
