= Alkylresorcinol =

Class of chemical compounds

Common structure of those in cereals

Bilobol (5-[(Z)-pentadec-8-enylo]resorcinol)

Alkylresorcinols (ARs), also known as resorcinolic lipids, are amphiphilic phenolic lipids characterised by a non-polar odd-numbered alkyl side chain with up to 27 carbon atoms attached to a polar resorcinol (1,3-dihydroxybenzene) ring.

== Natural sources of alkylresorcinols ==
Alkylresorcinols are relatively rare in nature and are reported to be found in fungi, bacteria, and some lower and higher plants. DB-2073 is an antibiotic isolated from the broth culture of Pseudomonas sp. They are also the main constituents of the outer shell of the cyst of Azotobacter.

Among the plant sources, the shell oil of cashew nut (Anacardium occidentale L.) has the highest amount of ARs, which consists of 20% phenolic lipids. Moreover, ARs were found in the peels and pulp of peas (Pisum sativum L.), pulp and leaves of ginkgo (Ginkgo biloba L.), pulp and peels of mango (Mangifera indica L.), and in some cereals. In the case of cereals, the hyaline layer, inner pericarp, and testa showed the highest amounts of AR.

DB-2073 (2-n-hexyl-5-n-propylresorcinol)

=== Occurrence in cereals ===
The alkylresorcinols alkyl chain, present in cereals, ranges from 15 to 25 carbon atoms. ARs have been reported to be present in high amounts in rye, wheat, and triticale, and in low concentrations in barley, maize, oat, and millet, while no information is at present available for Khorasan wheat. They are most abundant in the bran fractions (2600-4100 μg/g; 0.1-0.3% of dry weight), whereas they are in trace amounts in strachy endosperm and germ. They can also be found in rice, though not in the edible parts of the rice plant.

Their presence in the endosperm (the part of cereal grain that is used to make white flour), means that alkylresorcinols can be used as 'biomarkers' for people who eat foods containing wholegrain wheat and rye, rather than cereal products based on white flour. Moreover, they were thought to have anti-nutritive properties (e.g. decreasing growth of pigs and chickens fed rye), but this theory has been discredited, and a number of animal studies have demonstrated that they have no obvious negative effect on animals or humans, while recent studies suggest they may have some health benefits as activators of the enzyme SIRT3, with the 17-carbon homologue 5-heptadecylresorcinol showing strongest activity.

==== Biomarkers of a whole grain diet ====
Increasing evidence from human intervention trials suggests that they are the most promising biomarker of whole grain wheat and rye intake. Alkylresorcinol metabolites, 3,5-dihydroxybenzoic acid (DHBA) and 3,5-dihydroxyphenylpropionoic acid (DHPPA) were first identified in urine and can be quantified in urine and plasma, and may be an alternative, equivalent biomarker of whole grain wheat intake.

The average intake of alkylresorcinols in the UK is around 11 mg/person/day, and in Sweden is around 20 mg/person/day. This varies widely depending on whether people normally consume wholegrain/wholemeal/brown bread, which is high in alkylresorcinols (300-1000 μg/g), or white wheat bread, which has very low concentrations of alkylresorcinols (<50 μg/g).

==== Biomarkers of cereal presence in archaeological pottery ====
Recently, alkylresorcinols have been widely recognised as a biomarker for the presence of cereals in archaeological pottery. They were previously found in a well-preserved Bronze Age wooden container from Switzerland, and coarse ware vessels from a Roman cavalry barrack at Vindolanda. A study demonstrated that the survival of ARs is highly dependent on the cooking procedures and burial conditions. However, if recoverable, analysis of these phenolic lipids in archaeological contexts is valuable as it can help explain the uptake and spread of cereal processing of past communities in particular regions.

== Possible biological activities ==
In vitro studies have shown that alkylresorcinols may prevent cells turning cancerous, but that they do not have any effect on cells that are already cancerous. Alkylresorcinols also increase gamma-tocopherol levels in rats when fed in high amounts (0.2% of total diet and above).

The alkylresorcinols in Grevillea banksii and Grevillea 'Robyn Gordon' are responsible for contact dermatitis.

== Trivial names of some resorcinolic lipids ==
- olivetol
- persoonol
- grevillol
- ardisinol I
- ardisinol II
- adipostatin A
- adipostatin B
- bilobol
- hexylresorcinol
- hydrobilobol
- cardol
- rucinol
- irisresorcinol
- panosialin
- stemphol
- R-leprosol
- α-leprosol
- merulinic acid
- xenognosin

== Derivatives ==
Sorgoleone is a hydrophobic root exudate of Sorghum bicolor.
