= Rubrosterone =

Names
- IUPAC name 2β,3β,14α-Trihydroxy-5β-androst-7-ene-6,17-dione
- Systematic IUPAC name (3aR,5aR,7R,8S,9aR,9bR,11aS)-3a,7,8-Trihydroxy-9a,11a-dimethyl-3,3a,5a,6,7,8,9,9a,9b,10,11,11a-dodecahydro-1H-cyclopenta[a]phenanthrene-1,5(2H)-dione
- Other names 2,3,14-Trihydroxyandrost-7-ene-6,17-dione

Identifiers
| CAS Number | 19466-41-2 |
| 3D model (JSmol) | Interactive image |
| ChEMBL | ChEMBL2087163 |
| ChemSpider | 19989140 |
| PubChem CID | 12315102 |
| UNII | ND477TPA7H |
- InChI: InChI=1S/C19H26O5/c1-17-9-15(22)14(21)8-12(17)13(20)7-11-10(17)3-5-18(2)16(23)4-6-19(11,18)24/h7,10,12,14-15,21-22,24H,3-6,8-9H2,1-2H3/t10-,12-,14+,15-,17+,18+,19+/m0/s1 Key: OMQCWEJQYPUGJG-DTDIXVHCSA-N; InChI=1/C19H26O5/c1-17-9-15(22)14(21)8-12(17)13(20)7-11-10(17)3-5-18(2)16(23)4-6-19(11,18)24/h7,10,12,14-15,21-22,24H,3-6,8-9H2,1-2H3/t10-,12-,14+,15-,17+,18+,19+/m0/s1 Key: OMQCWEJQYPUGJG-DTDIXVHCBX
- SMILES: O[C@@H]1[C@H](O)C[C@](C(C=C2[C@]3([H])CC[C@@]4(C)[C@@]2(O)CCC4=O)=O)([H])[C@]3(C)C1

Properties
| Chemical formula | C_{19}H_{26}O_{5} |
| Molar mass | 334.412 g·mol^{−1} |
- Except where otherwise noted, data are given for materials in their standard state (at 25 °C [77 °F], 100 kPa). verify (what is ?) Infobox references

Rubrosterone is a steroid found in insects and plants. Due to its similarity with vertebral steroids, there has been some interest in the study of its effects on humans.
