= Meta-Hydroxyphenylhydracrylic acid =

meta-Hydroxyphenylhydracrylic acid
- Chemical structure of meta-hydroxyphenylhydracrylic acid

Names
- Other names (-)-β-m-Hydroxyphenyl-hydracrylic acid m-HPHA

Identifiers
CAS Number	64662-02-8
3D model (JSmol)	Interactive image
ChEBI	CHEBI:78336
ChemSpider	11487695
PubChem CID	22600106
UNII	ET93YCZ5MJ
- InChI: InChI=1S/C9H10O4/c10-5-8(9(12)13)6-2-1-3-7(11)4-6/h1-4,8,10-11H,5H2,(H,12,13) Key: DGBMCKWHCNMPPE-UHFFFAOYSA-N
- SMILES: OCC(C(O)=O)c1cccc(O)c1

Properties
Chemical formula	C_{9}H_{10}O_{4}
Molar mass	182.175 g·mol^{−1}
- Except where otherwise noted, data are given for materials in their standard state (at 25 °C [77 °F], 100 kPa). verify (what is ?) Infobox references

meta-Hydroxyphenylhydracrylic acid is a metabolite in the degradation of (+)-catechin in the crab-eating macaque (Macaca irus) excreted in the urine. It is also a substance found in human urine.
