= Gentisate 1,2-dioxygenase =

Identifiers
- EC no.: 1.13.11.4
- CAS no.: 9029-48-5

Databases
- IntEnz: IntEnz view
- BRENDA: BRENDA entry
- ExPASy: NiceZyme view
- KEGG: KEGG entry
- MetaCyc: metabolic pathway
- PRIAM: profile
- PDB structures: RCSB PDB PDBe PDBsum
- Gene Ontology: AmiGO / QuickGO
Search
- PMC: articles
- PubMed: articles
- NCBI: proteins

Gentisate 1,2-dioxygenase (EC 1.13.11.4) is an enzyme that catalyzes the chemical reaction

Gentisic acid
O_{2}
3-Maleylpyruvic acid

The two substrates of this enzyme are gentisic acid and oxygen. Oxidative ring cleavage gives 3-maleylpyruvic aicd.

This enzyme belongs to the family of oxidoreductases, specifically those acting on single donors with O_{2} as oxidant and incorporation of two atoms of oxygen into the substrate (oxygenases). The oxygen incorporated need not be derived from O_{2}. The systematic name of this enzyme class is gentisate:oxygen 1,2-oxidoreductase (decyclizing). Other names in common use include gentisate oxygenase, 2,5-dihydroxybenzoate dioxygenase, gentisate dioxygenase, and gentisic acid oxidase. This enzyme participates in tyrosine metabolism. It employs one cofactor, iron.

== Structural studies ==
As of late 2007, only one structure has been solved for this class of enzymes, with the PDB accession code 2D40.
