= 3-Carboxy-cis,cis-muconic acid =

Names
- Preferred IUPAC name (1E,3Z)-Buta-1,3-diene-1,2,4-tricarboxylic acid

Identifiers
CAS Number	1116-26-3
3D model (JSmol)	Interactive image
ChEBI	CHEBI:15749
ChemSpider	4444085
KEGG	C01163
PubChem CID	5280404
UNII	5H95988TN5
CompTox Dashboard (EPA)	DTXSID60415055
- InChI: InChI=1S/C7H6O6/c8-5(9)2-1-4(7(12)13)3-6(10)11/h1-3H,(H,8,9)(H,10,11)(H,12,13)/b2-1-,4-3+ Key: KJOVGYUGXHIVAY-BXTBVDPRSA-N; InChI=1/C7H6O6/c8-5(9)2-1-4(7(12)13)3-6(10)11/h1-3H,(H,8,9)(H,10,11)(H,12,13)/b2-1-,4-3+ Key: KJOVGYUGXHIVAY-BXTBVDPRBN
- SMILES: OC(=O)\C=C/C(=C\C(O)=O)/C(O)=O

Properties
Chemical formula	C_{7}H_{6}O_{6}
Molar mass	186.119 g·mol^{−1}
Density	1.25 g cm^{−3}
Dipole moment	0.40 D
- Except where otherwise noted, data are given for materials in their standard state (at 25 °C [77 °F], 100 kPa). Infobox references

3-Carboxy-cis,cis-muconic acid is a metabolite of the catechin degradation by Bradyrhizobium japonicum.

== Biosynthesis ==
The enzyme protocatechuate 3,4-dioxygenase found in Pseudomonas aeruginosa uses protocatechuic acid and oxygen to produce 3-carboxy-cis,cis-muconate.

protocatechuic acid
O_{2}
3-carboxy-cis,cis-muconic acid

== Metabolism ==
The enzyme 3-carboxy-cis,cis-muconate cycloisomerase found in Pseudomonas putida converts 3-carboxy-cis,cis-muconate to 2-(carboxymethyl)-5-oxo-2,5-dihydro-2-furoic acid as part of a sequence which eventually gives β-ketoadipic acid.

3-carboxy-cis,cis-muconic acid
2-(carboxymethyl)-5-oxo-2,5-dihydro-2-furoic acid

The enzyme carboxy-cis,cis-muconate cyclase gives the isomeric 2-(carboxymethyl)-5-oxo-2,5-dihydro-3-furoic acid as its product.

3-carboxy-cis,cis-muconic acid
2-(carboxymethyl)-5-oxo-2,5-dihydro-3-furoic acid
