= 3,5-Dihydroxyphenylpropionoic acid =

- Chemical structure of 3,5-dihydroxyphenylpropionoic acid

Names
- Preferred IUPAC name 3-(3,5-Dihydroxyphenyl)propanoic acid
- Other names DHPPA

Identifiers
CAS Number	26539-01-5
3D model (JSmol)	Interactive image
ChemSpider	141878
ECHA InfoCard	100.189.620
KEGG	C22602
PubChem CID	161525
UNII	7YU8R3VQ5R
CompTox Dashboard (EPA)	DTXSID90181110
- InChI: InChI=1S/C9H10O4/c10-7-3-6(1-2-9(12)13)4-8(11)5-7/h3-5,10-11H,1-2H2,(H,12,13) Key: ITPFIKQWNDGDLG-UHFFFAOYSA-N; InChI=1/C9H10O4/c10-7-3-6(1-2-9(12)13)4-8(11)5-7/h3-5,10-11H,1-2H2,(H,12,13) Key: ITPFIKQWNDGDLG-UHFFFAOYAE
- SMILES: C1=C(C=C(C=C1O)O)CCC(=O)O

Properties
Chemical formula	C_{9}H_{10}O_{4}
Molar mass	182.175 g·mol^{−1}
- Except where otherwise noted, data are given for materials in their standard state (at 25 °C [77 °F], 100 kPa). Infobox references

3,5-Dihydroxyphenylpropionoic acid is a metabolite of alkylresorcinols, first identified in human urine and can be quantified in urine and plasma, and may be an alternative, equivalent biomarker of whole grain wheat intake.
