= Ethyl protocatechuate =

Names
- Preferred IUPAC name Ethyl 3,4-dihydroxybenzoate
- Other names Ethyl ester of 3,4-dihydroxybenzoic acid 3,4-Dihydroxybenzoic acid ethyl ester EDHB; Ethyl-3,4-dihydroxybenzoate

Identifiers
CAS Number	3943-89-3
3D model (JSmol)	Interactive image
ChEBI	CHEBI:132364
ChemSpider	69954
ECHA InfoCard	100.021.391
EC Number	223-529-0
PubChem CID	77547
UNII	4YGJ96WTBG
CompTox Dashboard (EPA)	DTXSID2057732
- InChI: InChI=1S/C9H10O4/c1-2-13-9(12)6-3-4-7(10)8(11)5-6/h3-5,10-11H,2H2,1H3 Key: KBPUBCVJHFXPOC-UHFFFAOYSA-N
- SMILES: CCOC(=O)C1=CC(=C(C=C1)O)O

Properties
Chemical formula	C_{9}H_{10}O_{4}
Molar mass	182.175 g·mol^{−1}
Appearance	White or pale brownish yellow, crystalline powder; odorless or has a faint phenol-like odour
Melting point	132 to 135 °C (270 to 275 °F; 405 to 408 K)
Boiling point	357 to 358 °C (675 to 676 °F; 630 to 631 K)
Solubility in water	Insoluble in water; soluble in ethanol
- Except where otherwise noted, data are given for materials in their standard state (at 25 °C [77 °F], 100 kPa). Infobox references

Ethyl protocatechuate is a phenolic compound. It can be found in the peanut seed testa. It is also present in wine. It is the ethylic ester of protocatechuic acid.

The compound is a prolyl 4-hydroxylase inhibitor and can be used to protect the myocardium.

== See also ==
- Phenolic content in wine
