= 3,5-Dihydroxybenzoic acid =

- Chemical structure of 3,5-dihydroxybenzoic acid

Names
- Preferred IUPAC name 3,5-Dihydroxybenzoic acid
- Other names α-Resorcylic acid

Identifiers
CAS Number	99-10-5
3D model (JSmol)	Interactive image
ChEBI	CHEBI:39912
ChEMBL	ChEMBL95308
ChemSpider	7146
ECHA InfoCard	100.002.482
EC Number	202-730-7
IUPHAR/BPS	5783
PubChem CID	7424
UNII	2WC5LMO6L1
CompTox Dashboard (EPA)	DTXSID8059184
- InChI: InChI=1S/C7H6O4/c8-5-1-4(7(10)11)2-6(9)3-5/h1-3,8-9H,(H,10,11) Key: UYEMGAFJOZZIFP-UHFFFAOYSA-N
- SMILES: C1=C(C=C(C=C1O)O)C(=O)O

Properties
Chemical formula	C_{7}H_{6}O_{4}
Molar mass	154.121 g·mol^{−1}
Melting point	235.3 °C (455.5 °F; 508.4 K)
Solubility in water	soluble
Solubility in acetone	soluble
Solubility in ethanol	very soluble
Solubility in diethyl ether	very soluble
Acidity (pK_{a})	4.04

Hazards
- GHS labelling
Pictograms	(GHS07: Exclamation mark)
Signal word	Warning
Hazard statements	H315, H319, H335
Precautionary statements	P261, P264, P271, P280, P302+P352, P304+P340, P305+P351+P338, P312, P321, P332+P313, P337+P313, P362, P403+P233, P405, P501

Related compounds
Related compounds	2,3-Dihydroxybenzoic acid; 2,4-Dihydroxybenzoic acid; 2,5-Dihydroxybenzoic acid; 2,6-Dihydroxybenzoic acid; 3,4-Dihydroxybenzoic acid
- Except where otherwise noted, data are given for materials in their standard state (at 25 °C [77 °F], 100 kPa). verify (what is ?) Infobox references

3,5-Dihydroxybenzoic acid (α-resorcylic acid) is a dihydroxybenzoic acid. It is a colorless solid.

== Preparation and occurrence ==
It is prepared by disulfonation of benzoic acid followed by hydrolysis of the disulfonate.

It is a metabolite of alkylresorcinols, first identified in human urine and can be quantified in urine and plasma, and may be an alternative, equivalent biomarker of whole grain wheat intake.
