= Dihydroxybenzoic acid =

Chemical structure of 2,4-dihydroxybenzoic acid

Dihydroxybenzoic acids (DHBA) are a type of phenolic acids.

There are six main compounds, having all the same molecular formula C_{7}H_{6}O_{4}. Those are:

- 2,3-Dihydroxybenzoic acid (2-Pyrocatechuic acid or hypogallic acid)
- 2,4-Dihydroxybenzoic acid (β-Resorcylic acid)
- 2,5-Dihydroxybenzoic acid (Gentisic acid)
- 2,6-Dihydroxybenzoic acid (γ-Resorcylic acid)
- 3,4-Dihydroxybenzoic acid (Protocatechuic acid)
- 3,5-Dihydroxybenzoic acid (α-Resorcylic acid)

Orsellinic acid is also a dihydoxybenzoic acid having an extra methyl group.
