= Dihydrocaffeic acid =

Names
- Preferred IUPAC name 3-(3,4-Dihydroxyphenyl)propanoic acid

Identifiers
| CAS Number | 1078-61-1 |
| 3D model (JSmol) | Interactive image |
| Beilstein Reference | 2213449 |
| ChEBI | CHEBI:48400 |
| ChEMBL | ChEMBL136927 |
| ChemSpider | 308986 |
| ECHA InfoCard | 100.012.804 |
| EC Number | 214-083-8 |
| Gmelin Reference | 482169 |
| KEGG | C10447 |
| PubChem CID | 348154 |
| UNII | MSW0228VUB |
| CompTox Dashboard (EPA) | DTXSID40221919 |
- InChI: InChI=1S/C9H10O4/c10-7-3-1-6(5-8(7)11)2-4-9(12)13/h1,3,5,10-11H,2,4H2,(H,12,13) Key: DZAUWHJDUNRCTF-UHFFFAOYSA-N
- SMILES: C1=CC(=C(C=C1CCC(=O)O)O)O

Properties
| Chemical formula | C_{9}H_{10}O_{4} |
| Molar mass | 182.175 g·mol^{−1} |
| Melting point | 136 °C (277 °F; 409 K) |
| Solubility in water | 42.8 g/L |

Hazards
- GHS labelling
| Pictograms | (GHS07: Exclamation mark) |
| Signal word | Warning |
| Hazard statements | H315, H319, H335 |
| Precautionary statements | P261, P264, P271, P280, P302+P352, P304+P340, P305+P351+P338, P312, P321, P332+P313, P337+P313, P362, P403+P233, P405, P501 |
- Except where otherwise noted, data are given for materials in their standard state (at 25 °C [77 °F], 100 kPa). Infobox references

Dihydrocaffeic acid (DHCA; systematic name 3-(3,4-dihydroxyphenyl)propionic acid) is a phytochemical found in grapes and other plants. DHCA is known to lower IL-6 production through down regulation of DNMT1 expression and inhibition of DNA methylation of the IL-6 gene in mice. DHCA in combination with malvidin-3′-O-glucoside (Mal-gluc) is effective in promoting resilience against stress by modulating brain synaptic plasticity and peripheral inflammation. DHCA/Mal-gluc also significantly lowered depression like phenotypes in mice that had increased peripheral inflammation caused by transplantation of hematopoietic progenitor cells from other more stress-susceptible mice.
