= 3-Maleylpyruvic acid =

Names
- Preferred IUPAC name (2Z)-4,6-Dioxohept-2-enedioic acid

Identifiers
CAS Number	75164-75-9
3D model (JSmol)	Interactive image
Beilstein Reference	1725756
ChEBI	CHEBI:30859
ChemSpider	4444134
KEGG	C02167
PubChem CID	5280494; 6857405 (dianion)
- InChI: InChI=1S/C7H6O6/c8-4(1-2-6(10)11)3-5(9)7(12)13/h1-2H,3H2,(H,10,11)(H,12,13)/b2-1- Key: AZCFLHZUFANAOR-UPHRSURJSA-N
- SMILES: C(C(=O)/C=C\C(=O)O)C(=O)C(=O)O

Properties
Chemical formula	C_{7}H_{6}O_{6}
Molar mass	186.119 g·mol^{−1}
- Except where otherwise noted, data are given for materials in their standard state (at 25 °C [77 °F], 100 kPa). Infobox references

3-Maleylpyruvic acid, or 3-maleylpyruvate, is a dicarboxylic acid formed by the oxidative ring opening of gentisic acid by gentisate 1,2-dioxygenase during the metabolism of tyrosine. It is converted into 3-fumarylpyruvate by maleylpyruvate isomerase.

== Biosynthesis ==
In some organisms, the amino acid tyrosine is metabolised to gentisic acid. In the presence of the enzyme gentisate 1,2-dioxygenase and oxygen, this compound undergoes a ring-opening reaction to give 3-maleylpyruvic acid:

gentisic acid
O_{2}
3-maleylpyruvic acid

This reaction has been used to detect gentisic acid with a whole-cell biosensor developed from a 3-maleylpyruvic acid-inducible gene expression system and the gentisate 1,2-dioxygenase gene from chemolithoautotrophic bacterium Cupriavidus necator.

== Metabolism ==
The enzyme maleylpyruvate isomerase converts 3-maleylpyruvic acid to its geometric isomer, 3-fumarylpyruvic acid.

cis isomer
trans isomer
