= Protocatechuic acid =

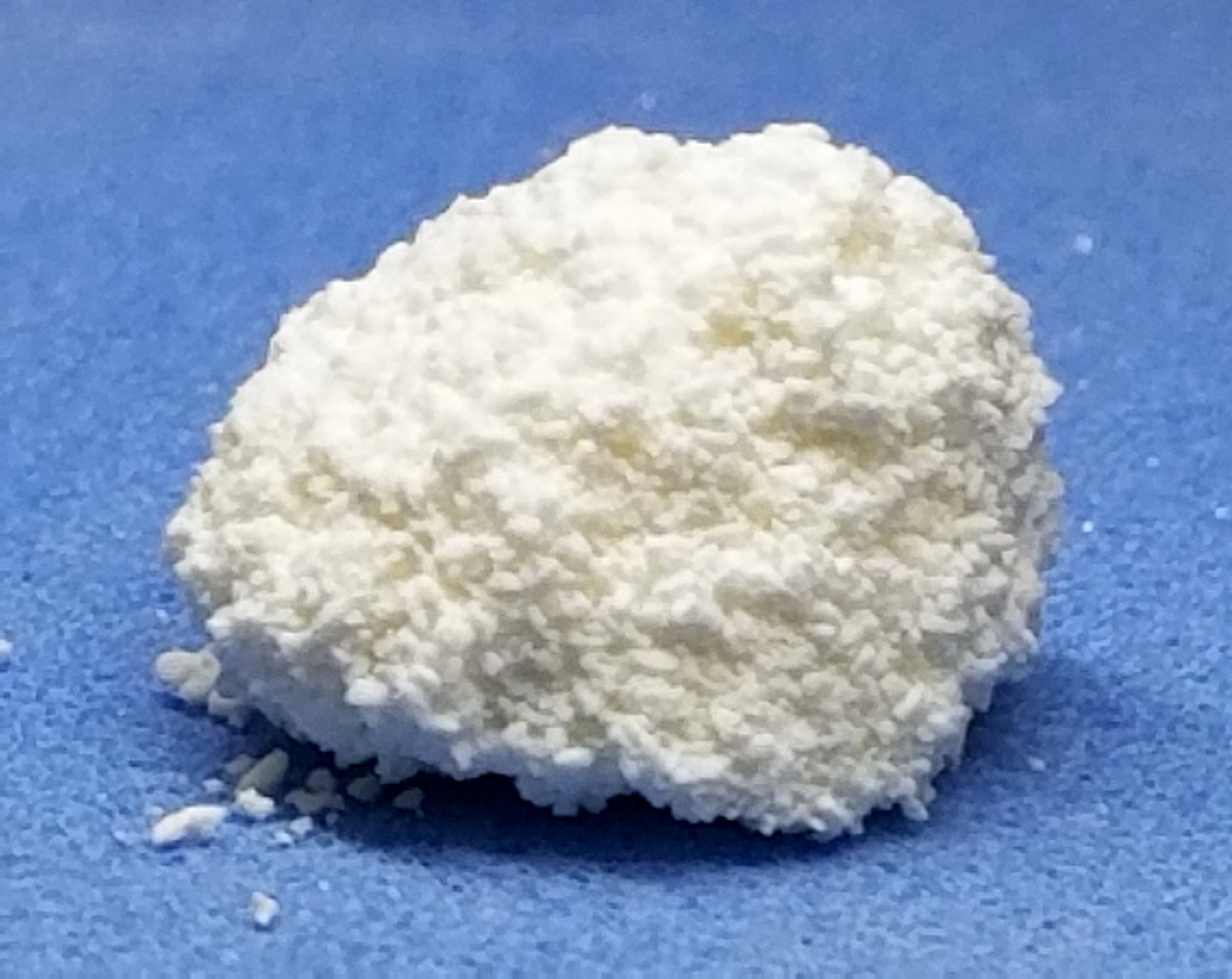

Names
- Preferred IUPAC name 3,4-Dihydroxybenzoic acid
- Other names 3,4-Dihydroxybenzoic acid PCA; Protocatechuate

Identifiers
CAS Number	99-50-3
3D model (JSmol)	Interactive image
ChEBI	CHEBI:36062
ChEMBL	ChEMBL37537
ChemSpider	71
DrugBank	DB03946
ECHA InfoCard	100.002.509
EC Number	202-760-0
KEGG	C00230
PubChem CID	72
RTECS number	UL0560000
UNII	36R5QJ8L4B
CompTox Dashboard (EPA)	DTXSID4021212
- InChI: InChI=1S/C7H6O4/c8-5-2-1-4(7(10)11)3-6(5)9/h1-3,8-9H,(H,10,11) Key: YQUVCSBJEUQKSH-UHFFFAOYSA-N
- SMILES: C1=CC(=C(C=C1C(=O)O)O)O

Properties
Chemical formula	C_{7}H_{6}O_{4}
Molar mass	154.121 g·mol^{−1}
Appearance	light brown solid
Density	1.524 g/cm^{3} (4 °C (39 °F; 277 K))
Melting point	202 °C (396 °F; 475 K)
Solubility in water	18 g/L (14 °C (57 °F; 287 K)); 271 g/L (80 °C (176 °F; 353 K))
Solubility in ethanol	very soluble
Solubility in diethyl ether	soluble
Acidity (pK_{a})	4.48; 8.83; 12.6

Hazards
NFPA 704 (fire diamond)	2 0 0
Safety data sheet (SDS)	MSDS

Related compounds
Related compounds	2,3-Dihydroxybenzoic acid; 2,4-Dihydroxybenzoic acid; 2,5-Dihydroxybenzoic acid; 2,6-Dihydroxybenzoic acid; 3,5-Dihydroxybenzoic acid; Ethyl protocatechuate
- Except where otherwise noted, data are given for materials in their standard state (at 25 °C [77 °F], 100 kPa). verify (what is ?) Infobox references

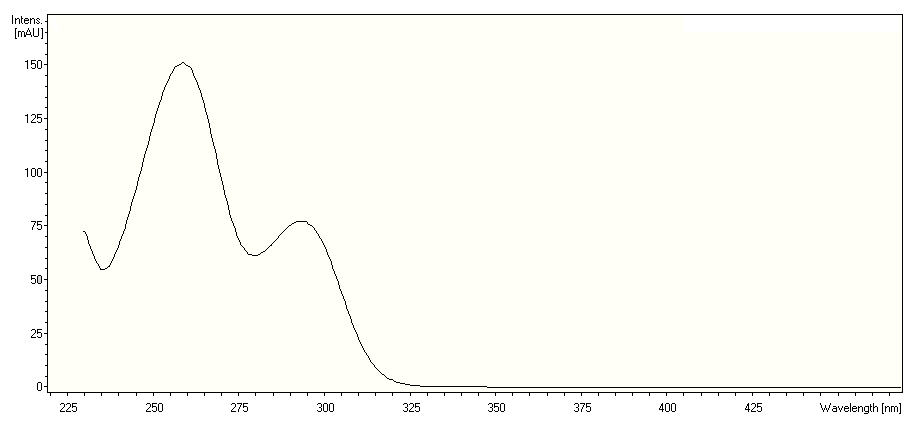
UV visible spectrum of protocatechuic acid

Protocatechuic acid (PCA) is a dihydroxybenzoic acid, a type of phenolic acid. Its name is derived from the catechu extract. It is a major metabolite of antioxidant polyphenols found in green tea. It has mixed effects on normal and cancer cells in in vitro and in vivo studies. It is produced commercially from vanillin.

== Biological effects ==
Protocatechuic acid (PCA) is antioxidant and anti-inflammatory. PCA extracted from Hibiscus sabdariffa protected against chemically induced liver toxicity in vivo. In vitro testing documented antioxidant and anti-inflammatory activity of PCA, while liver protection in vivo was measured by chemical markers and histological assessment.

PCA has been reported to induce apoptosis of human leukemia cells, as well as malignant HSG1 cells taken from human oral cavities, but PCA was found to have mixed effects on TPA-induced mouse skin tumours. Depending on the amount of PCA and the time before application, PCA could reduce or enhance tumour growth. Similarly, PCA was reported to increase proliferation and inhibit apoptosis of neural stem cells. In an in vitro model using HL-60 leukemia cells, protocatechuic acid showed an antigenotoxic effect and tumoricidal activity. In two preclinical investigations, protocatechuic acid from Hibiscus sabdariffa showed an excellent ability to effectively inhibit the replication of herpes simplex virus type 2 and to potently deactivate the catalytic activity of urease.

== Occurrence in nature ==
Protocatechuic acid is one of the most common phenolic acids, and can be isolated from various plant sources. Some examples include the catechu, the stem bark of Boswellia dalzielii. and from leaves of Diospyros melanoxylon.

The hardening of the protein component of insect cuticle has been shown to be due to the tanning action of an agent produced by oxidation of a phenolic substance. In the analogous hardening of the cockroach ootheca, the phenolic substance concerned is protocatechuic acid.

=== In foods ===
Açaí oil, obtained from the fruit of the açaí palm (Euterpe oleracea), is rich in protocatechuic acid (630±36 mg/kg). Protocatechuic acid also exists in the skins of some strains of onion as an antifungal mechanism, increasing endogenous resistance against smudge fungus. It is also found in Allium cepa (17,540 ppm).

PCA occurs in roselle (Hibiscus sabdariffa), which is used worldwide as a food and beverage.

Protocatechuic acid is also found in mushrooms such as Agaricus bisporus or Phellinus linteus.

PCA is regarded as an active component in traditional Chinese herbal medicine such as Stenoloma chusanum (L.) Ching, Ilex chinensis Sims, Cibotium barometz (L.) J.Sm.

== Metabolism ==
Protocatechuic acid is one of the main catechins metabolites found in humans after consumption of green tea infusions.

=== Enzymes ===
Biosynthesis enzymes

- 3-dehydroshikimate dehydratase
- (3S,4R)-3,4-dihydroxycyclohexa-1,5-diene-1,4-dicarboxylate dehydrogenase
- terephthalate 1,2-cis-dihydrodiol dehydrogenase
- 3-hydroxybenzoate 4-monooxygenase
- 4-hydroxybenzoate 3-monooxygenase (NAD(P)H)
- 4-sulfobenzoate 3,4-dioxygenase
- vanillate monooxygenase
- 3,4-dihydroxyphthalate decarboxylase
- 4,5-dihydroxyphthalate decarboxylase

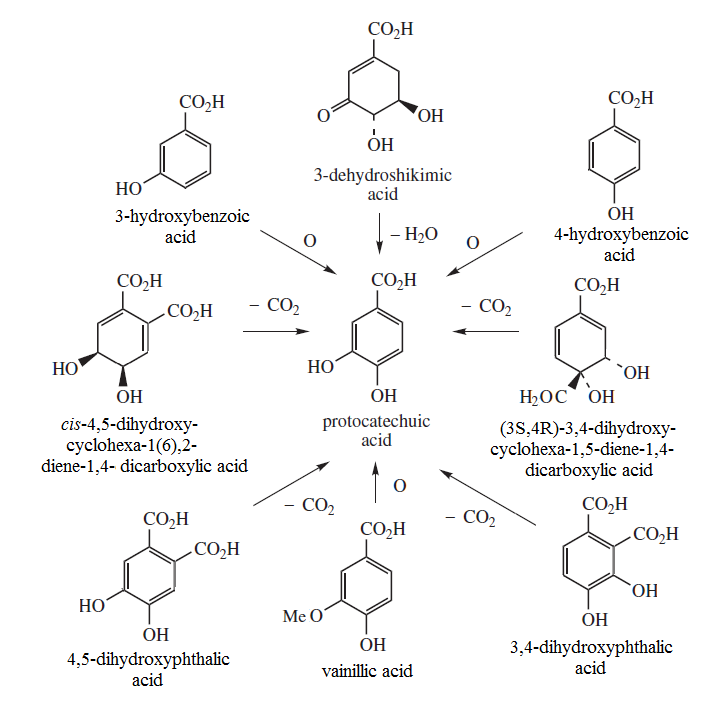
Protocatechuic acid biosynthesis

Degradation enzymes

- The enzyme protocatechuate decarboxylase uses 3,4-dihydroxybenzoate to produce catechol and CO_{2}.
- The enzyme protocatechuate 3,4-dioxygenase uses 3,4-dihydroxybenzoate and oxygen to produce 3-carboxy-cis,cis-muconate.
protocatechuic acid
O_{2}
3-carboxy-cis,cis-muconic acid
