= 2,4-Dihydroxybenzoic acid =

- Chemical structure of 2,4-dihydroxybenzoic acid

Names
- Preferred IUPAC name 2,4-Dihydroxybenzoic acid
- Other names: β-Resorcylic acid β-Resorcinolic acid; p-Hydroxysalicylic acid; 2,4-DHBA

Identifiers
CAS Number	89-86-1
3D model (JSmol)	Interactive image
ChEBI	CHEBI:42094
ChEMBL	ChEMBL328910
ChemSpider	1446
DrugBank	DB02839
ECHA InfoCard	100.001.770
PubChem CID	1491
UNII	LU39SC9JYL
CompTox Dashboard (EPA)	DTXSID0025074
- InChI: InChI=1S/C7H6O4/c8-4-1-2-5(7(10)11)6(9)3-4/h1-3,8-9H,(H,10,11) Key: UIAFKZKHHVMJGS-UHFFFAOYSA-N
- SMILES: C1=CC(=C(C=C1O)O)C(=O)O

Properties
Chemical formula	C_{7}H_{6}O_{4}
Molar mass	154.121 g·mol^{−1}
Melting point	229 °C (444 °F; 502 K)
Solubility in water	soluble
Solubility in ethanol	soluble
Solubility in diethyl ether	soluble
Solubility in benzene	soluble
Acidity (pK_{a})	3.11; 8.55; 14.0

Hazards
- GHS labelling
Pictograms	(GHS07: Exclamation mark)
Signal word	Warning
Hazard statements	H315, H319, H335
Precautionary statements	P261, P280, P302+P352, P305+P351+P338

Related compounds
Related compounds	2,3-Dihydroxybenzoic acid; 2,5-Dihydroxybenzoic acid; 2,6-Dihydroxybenzoic acid; 3,4-Dihydroxybenzoic acid; 3,5-Dihydroxybenzoic acid
- Except where otherwise noted, data are given for materials in their standard state (at 25 °C [77 °F], 100 kPa). verify (what is ?) Infobox references

2,4-Dihydroxybenzoic acid (β-resorcylic acid) is a dihydroxybenzoic acid.

As a resorcylic acid, it is one of the three isomeric crystalline acids that are both carboxyl derivatives of resorcinol and dihydroxy derivatives of benzoic acid. Synthesis from resorcinol is via the Kolbe-Schmitt reaction.

It is a degradation product of cyanidin glycosides from tart cherries in cell cultures. It is also a metabolite found in human plasma after cranberry juice consumption.
