= 2,6-Dihydroxybenzoic acid =

- Chemical structure of 2,6-dihydroxybenzoic acid

Names
- Preferred IUPAC name 2,6-Dihydroxybenzoic acid
- Other names: γ-Resorcylic acid; 2-Carboxyresorcinol; 2,6-Resorcylic acid

Identifiers
| CAS Number | 303-07-1 |
| 3D model (JSmol) | Interactive image |
| ChEMBL | ChEMBL454808 |
| ChemSpider | 8974 |
| ECHA InfoCard | 100.005.578 |
| PubChem CID | 9338 |
| UNII | RSA5G6VRPV |
| CompTox Dashboard (EPA) | DTXSID1059785 |
- InChI: InChI=1S/C7H6O4/c8-4-2-1-3-5(9)6(4)7(10)11/h1-3,8-9H,(H,10,11) Key: AKEUNCKRJATALU-UHFFFAOYSA-N
- SMILES: C1=CC(=C(C(=C1)O)C(=O)O)O

Properties
| Chemical formula | C_{7}H_{6}O_{4} |
| Molar mass | 154.121 g·mol^{−1} |
| Melting point | 171 °C (340 °F; 444 K) |
| Solubility in water | soluble |
| Solubility in ethanol | soluble |
| Solubility in diethyl ether | soluble |
| Solubility in trifluoroacetic acid | slightly soluble |

Related compounds
| Related compounds | 2,3-Dihydroxybenzoic acid; 2,4-Dihydroxybenzoic acid; 2,5-Dihydroxybenzoic acid; 3,4-Dihydroxybenzoic acid; 3,5-Dihydroxybenzoic acid |
- Except where otherwise noted, data are given for materials in their standard state (at 25 °C [77 °F], 100 kPa). verify (what is ?) Infobox references

2,6-Dihydroxybenzoic acid (γ-resorcylic acid) is a dihydroxybenzoic acid.
