= Gentisic acid =

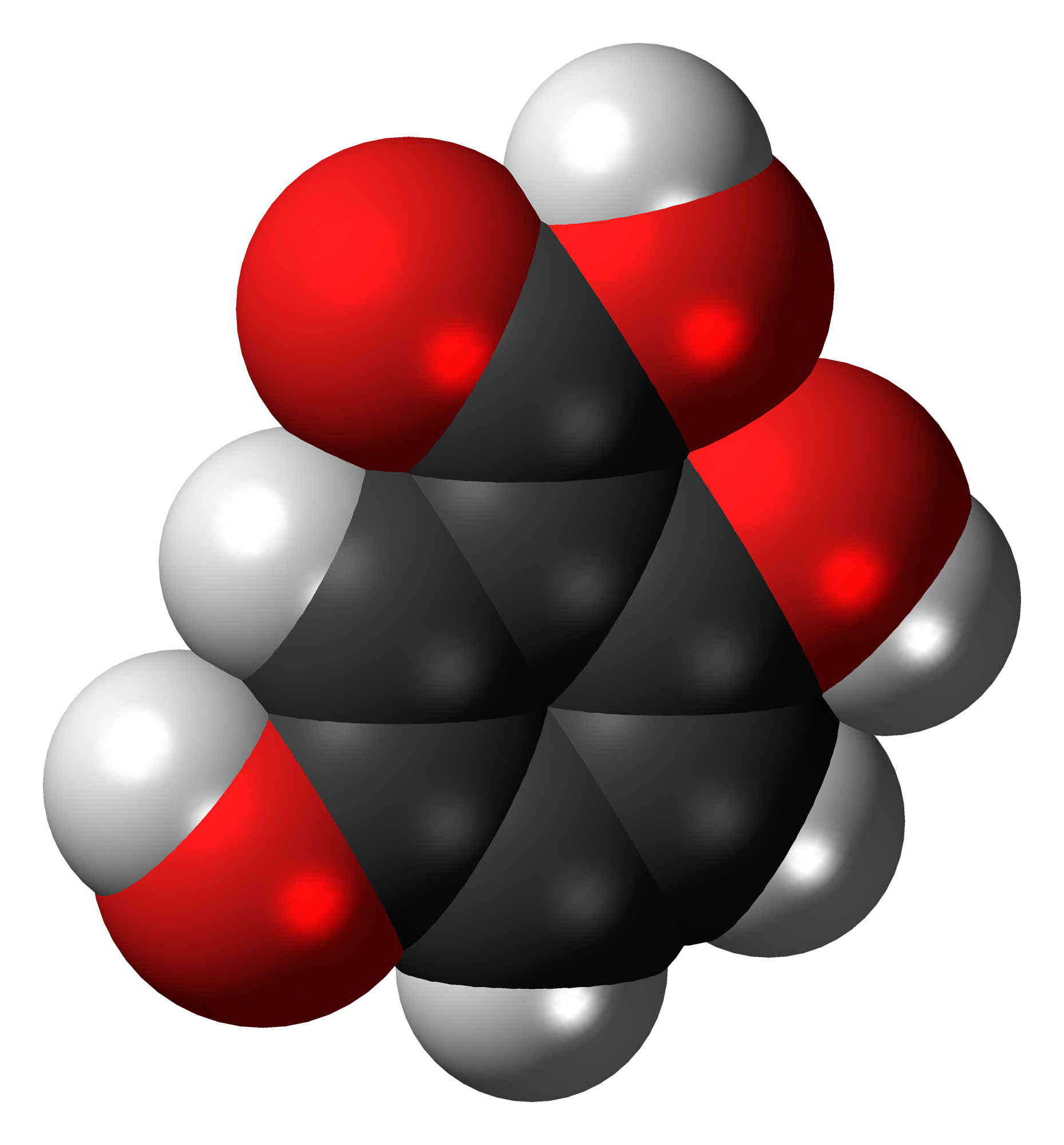

Names
- Preferred IUPAC name 2,5-Dihydroxybenzoic acid
- Other names: DHB; 5-Hydroxysalicylic acid; Gentianic acid; Carboxyhydroquinone; 2,5-Dioxybenzoic Acid; Hydroquinonecarboxylic acid

Identifiers
CAS Number	490-79-9
3D model (JSmol)	Interactive image
ChEBI	CHEBI:17189
ChEMBL	ChEMBL1461
ChemSpider	3350
ECHA InfoCard	100.007.017
KEGG	C00628
PubChem CID	3469
UNII	VP36V95O3T
CompTox Dashboard (EPA)	DTXSID4060078
- InChI: InChI=1S/C7H6O4/c8-4-1-2-6(9)5(3-4)7(10)11/h1-3,8-9H,(H,10,11) Key: WXTMDXOMEHJXQO-UHFFFAOYSA-N
- SMILES: O=C(O)c1cc(O)ccc1O

Properties
Chemical formula	C_{7}H_{6}O_{4}
Molar mass	154.121 g·mol^{−1}
Appearance	white to yellow powder
Melting point	204 °C (399 °F; 477 K)
Solubility in water	very soluble
Solubility in ethanol	very soluble
Solubility in diethyl ether	very soluble
Solubility in acetone	soluble
Acidity (pK_{a})	2.97

Related compounds
Related compounds	2,3-Dihydroxybenzoic acid; 2,4-Dihydroxybenzoic acid; 2,6-Dihydroxybenzoic acid; 3,4-Dihydroxybenzoic acid; 3,5-Dihydroxybenzoic acid
- Except where otherwise noted, data are given for materials in their standard state (at 25 °C [77 °F], 100 kPa). Infobox references

Gentisic acid is a dihydroxybenzoic acid. It is a derivative of benzoic acid and a minor (1%) product of the metabolic break down of aspirin, excreted by the kidneys.

It is also found in the African tree Alchornea cordifolia and in wine.

== Production ==
Gentisic acid is produced by carboxylation of hydroquinone.

C_{6}H_{4}(OH)_{2} + CO_{2} → C_{6}H_{3}(CO_{2}H)(OH)_{2}

This conversion is an example of a Kolbe–Schmitt reaction.

Alternatively the compound can be synthesized from salicylic acid via Elbs persulfate oxidation.

== Metabolism ==
In the presence of the enzyme gentisate 1,2-dioxygenase and oxygen, gentisic acid undergoes a ring-opening reaction to give 3-maleylpyruvic acid:

gentisic acid
O_{2}
3-maleylpyruvic acid

This reaction has been used to detect gentisic acid with a whole-cell biosensor developed from a 3-maleylpyruvic acid-inducible gene expression system and the gentisate 1,2-dioxygenase gene from chemolithoautotrophic bacterium Cupriavidus necator.

== Applications ==
As a hydroquinone, gentisic acid is readily oxidised and is used as an antioxidant excipient in some pharmaceutical preparations.

In the laboratory, it is used as a sample matrix in matrix-assisted laser desorption/ionization (MALDI) mass spectrometry, and has been shown to conveniently detect peptides incorporating the boronic acid moiety by MALDI.
