= 2,3-Dihydroxybenzoic acid =

Names
- Preferred IUPAC name 2,3-Dihydroxybenzoic acid
- Other names: Hypogallic acid; 2-Pyrocatechuic acid; o-Pyrocatechuic acid

Identifiers
| CAS Number | 303-38-8 |
| 3D model (JSmol) | Interactive image; Interactive image |
| Abbreviations | 2,3-DHBA; 2,3-DHB |
| ChEBI | CHEBI:18026 |
| ChEMBL | ChEMBL1432 |
| ChemSpider | 18 |
| DrugBank | DB01672 |
| ECHA InfoCard | 100.005.582 |
| KEGG | C00196 |
| PubChem CID | 19 |
| UNII | 70D5FBB392 |
| CompTox Dashboard (EPA) | DTXSID70858712 |
- InChI: InChI=1S/C7H6O4/c8-5-3-1-2-4(6(5)9)7(10)11/h1-3,8-9H,(H,10,11) Key: GLDQAMYCGOIJDV-UHFFFAOYSA-N; InChI=1/C7H6O4/c8-5-3-1-2-4(6(5)9)7(10)11/h1-3,8-9H,(H,10,11) Key: GLDQAMYCGOIJDV-UHFFFAOYAE
- SMILES: O=C(O)c1cccc(O)c1O; c1cc(c(c(c1)O)O)C(=O)O

Properties
| Chemical formula | C_{7}H_{6}O_{4} |
| Molar mass | 154.121 g·mol^{−1} |
| Appearance | Colorless solid |
| Density | 1.542 g/cm^{3} (20 °C) |
| Melting point | 205 °C (401 °F; 478 K) |
| Solubility in water | soluble |
| Solubility in ethanol | soluble |
| Solubility in diethyl ether | soluble |
| Solubility in acetone | soluble |

Related compounds
| Related compounds | 2,4-Dihydroxybenzoic acid; 2,5-Dihydroxybenzoic acid; 2,6-Dihydroxybenzoic acid; 3,4-Dihydroxybenzoic acid; 3,5-Dihydroxybenzoic acid |
- Except where otherwise noted, data are given for materials in their standard state (at 25 °C [77 °F], 100 kPa). verify (what is ?) Infobox references

2,3-Dihydroxybenzoic acid is a dihydroxybenzoic acid, a type of organic compound. It occurs naturally in various plants, bacteria, and fungi.

== Uses ==
It is a potentially useful iron-chelating drug and has antimicrobial properties.

== Occurrence ==
It is found in Phyllanthus acidus and in the aquatic fern Salvinia molesta. It is also abundant in the fruits of Flacourtia inermis.

The colorless solid occurs naturally, being formed via the shikimate pathway. It is incorporated into various siderophores, which are molecules that strongly complex iron ions for absorption into bacteria. 2,3-DHB consists of a catechol group, which upon deprotonation binds iron centers very strongly, and the carboxylic acid group by which the ring attaches to various scaffolds through amide bonds. A famous high affinity siderophore is enterochelin, which contains three dihydroxybenzoyl substituents linked to the depsipeptide of serine.

2,3-Dihydroxybenzoic acid is also a product of human aspirin metabolism.
