= Anacardium othonianum =

Scientific classification
- Kingdom: Plantae
- Clade: Tracheophytes
- Clade: Angiosperms
- Clade: Eudicots
- Clade: Rosids
- Order: Sapindales
- Family: Anacardiaceae
- Genus: Anacardium
- Species: A. othonianum

Binomial name
- Anacardium othonianum Rizzini

Species of flowering plant

Anacardium othonianum is a tree native from the tropical savanna (cerrado) region of Brazil, whose fruit is similar to (but smaller than) that of the common cashew tree (A. occidentale) of the Brazilian Northeast. It is locally known by the Tupi-derived name cajuí, and by the Portuguese names caju-de-árvore-do-cerrado ("tree cashew of the cerrado"), caju-vermelho-de-goiás ("red cashew from Goiás"), cajuzinho-do-cerrado or just cajuzinho ("little cashew").

The species name honors Brazilian botanist Othon Xavier de Brito Machado.

== Description and habitat ==
The tree grows wild in the central region of Brazil, mostly in the state of Goiás.

In the wild, the adult tree ranges from 2 to 6 metres (3 m on average), and produces from 200 to 600 fruits every season. The bark is dark and fissured. The leaves (which are reddish when young) are smooth and obovate, measuring about 15 by 10 cm, with 4 to 8 mm long stalks.

The small pink flowers (4 to 8 mm) are gathered in panicles about 20 cm wide, and are pollinated by bees and wasps. The pear-shaped edible "fruit" — technically a pseudofruit, an achene that develops from the flower stalk — is light red when mature, 2 to 3 cm wide by 2 to 4 cm long weighing between 5 and 10 grams.

As in the common cashew, the true fruit is a kidney-shaped drupe, 15 to 20 mm long and 12 to 15 mm wide, that hangs from the base of the achene: it encloses a single seed covered by a hard capsule, which may be green gray, or dark brown. The fruit's skin contains a strongly irritating oil composed mostly of anacardic acid, cardol, cardanol and other aromatic compounds.

The tree is found at altitudes between 380m and 1100m, mostly above 780m; it prefers acidic soils (pH 4,5-6,5) and tolerates droughts and poor soils. It is easily propagated from seeds. It flowers between June and October; fruits mature in September and October, and can be harvested two or three years after planting.

== Uses ==
The tree is not grown commercially yet, but is commonly found in farms and the wild. The pseudofruits are eaten locally; they are rich in vitamin C and soluble and insoluble fiber. They are said to be tastier than those of the common cashew, for being sweeter and free from astringency. Because of their short shelf life (about 10 days when refrigerated) their consumption is mostly confined to the cerrado region. They are also used for juices, sherbets, candied fruit, jams, and preserves, mostly by local cottage industries.

The toasted nut is edible and similar to the common cashew nut. Its fatty fraction consists mostly of esters of the oleic (60%) and linoleic (21%) acids.

The tea from its bark or leaves is used in the local folk medicine against diarrhea and as gargle for throat infections. The resin can be used as expectorant. The root is used as a purgative.
