= Sanoor =

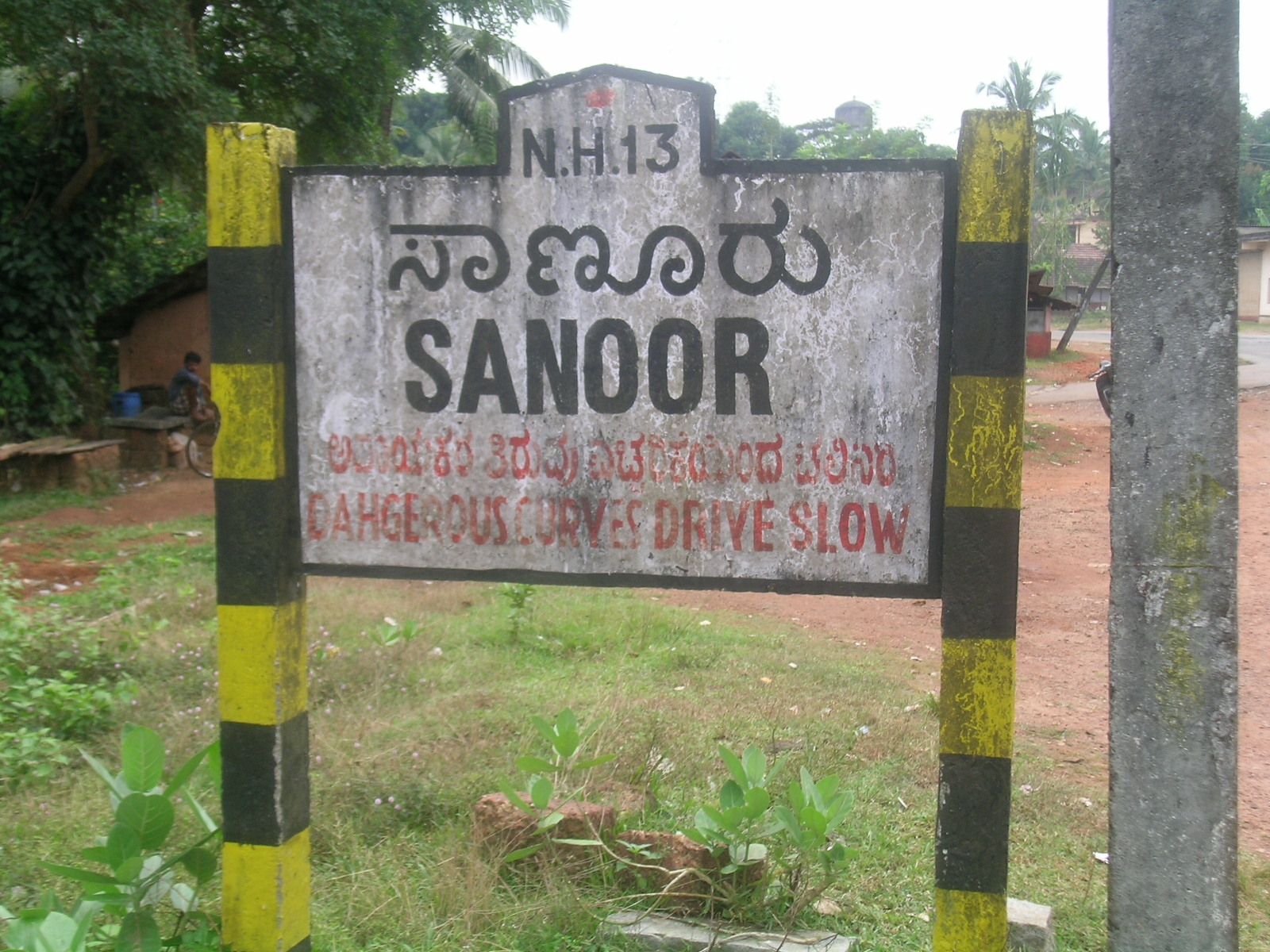
- National Highway sign at Sanoor
- Interactive map of Sanoor
- Coordinates: 13°10′37″N 74°59′35″E
- Country: India
- State: Karnataka
- District: Udupi
- Grama Panchayath: Sanoor Grama Panchayath
- Headquarters: Udupi
- Talukas: Karkala

Population (2001)
  - Total: 6,328

Languages
  - Official: Kannada
  - Spoken languages: Tulu, Kannada, Konkani, Beary

Ethnicity
  - Ethnic groups: Hindu, Jain, Muslim, Christian
- Time zone: UTC+5:30 (IST)
- PIN: 574 114
- Telephone code: 8258
- Nearest city: Mangalore
- Sex ratio: 1.11 male-female
- Literacy: 90%
- Lok Sabha constituency: Chickamagalur Loksabha Constituency
- Vidhan Sabha constituency: Karkala Vidhansabha Kshethra(122nd)
- Distance from Mysore: 250 kilometres (160 mi) (road)
- Distance from Bangalore: 380 kilometres (240 mi) (road)
- The Shambhavi River originates here and flows into the Arabian Sea at Mulky

Sanoor is a village in the southern state of Karnataka, India. During the British Raj, the village was headed by the Patels (Patler). Since independence, it has been administered by a mandala Panchayati raj. The nearest court is in Karkala, 5 kilometres (3.1 mi) from the village center. Sanoor has several primary schools and a government pre-university college. The Tulu language is widely spoken; other languages spoken in the village are Konkani and Kannada. The Bunt (or Nadava) and Billava were early ethnic communities, with the Marathi, Konkani and Brahmins arriving later. With Portuguese settlement, villagers converted to Catholicism. Local Muslims belong to the Moplah community, are known as Beary and speak the Beary dialect of Tulu. The Beary, living in the region for over a thousand years, may be descended from Arab (baharis; outsiders, or overseas) traders.

The village economy is based on agriculture and labour. Hamlets are Irvathuru, Pulkeri, Murathangady, Aayere and Thanada.

The weather is mild with light spells of rain during winter. During Summer, temperatures reach 35 degrees. The monsoon is plentiful enough to fill the river that dries up at the end of summer.

The village is 4.5 km away from Karkala Town, 47 km away from Mangalore and Udupi

== Name ==
Sanoor means "small village" in Kannada.

== Geography ==
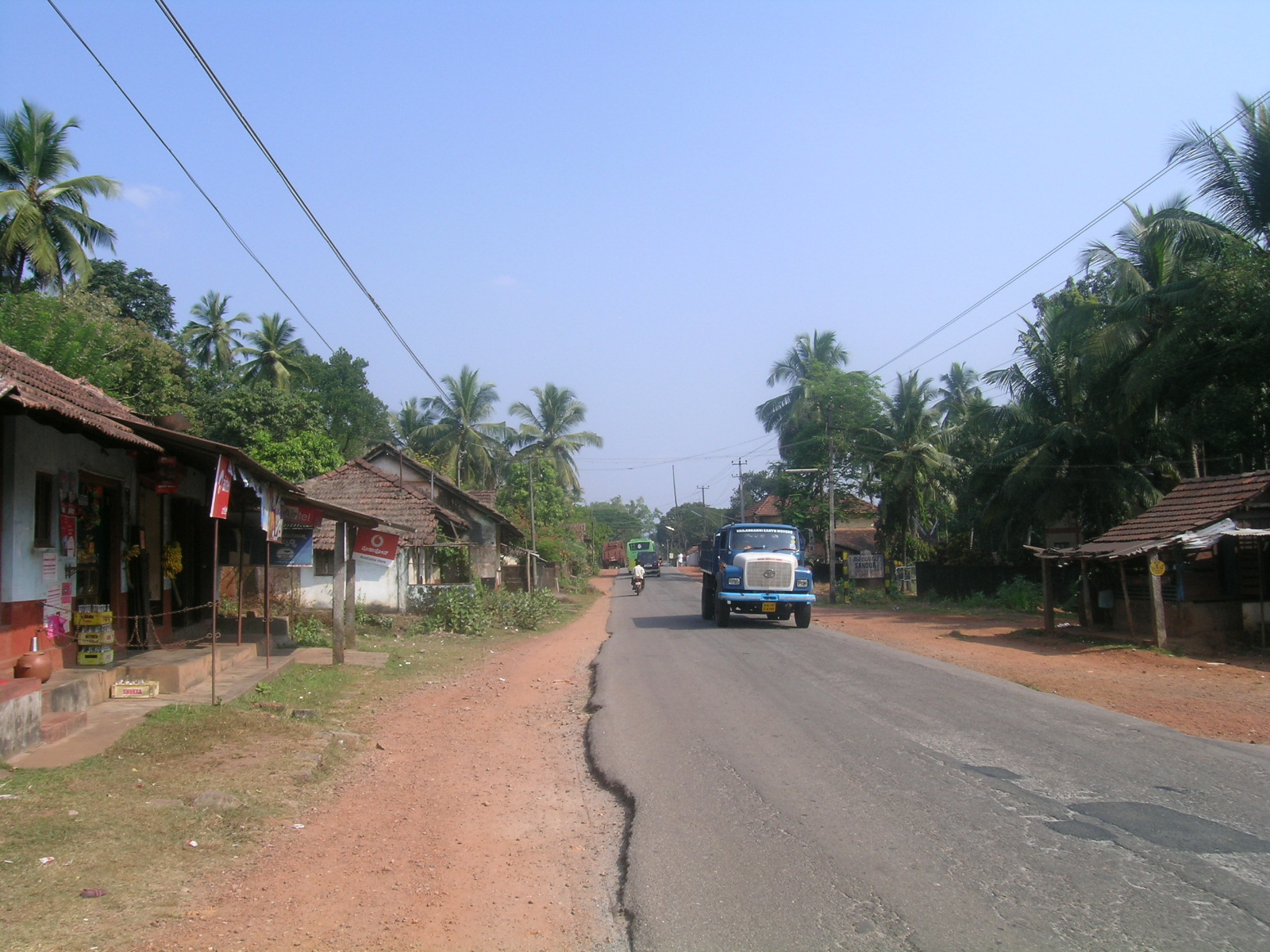
Main street

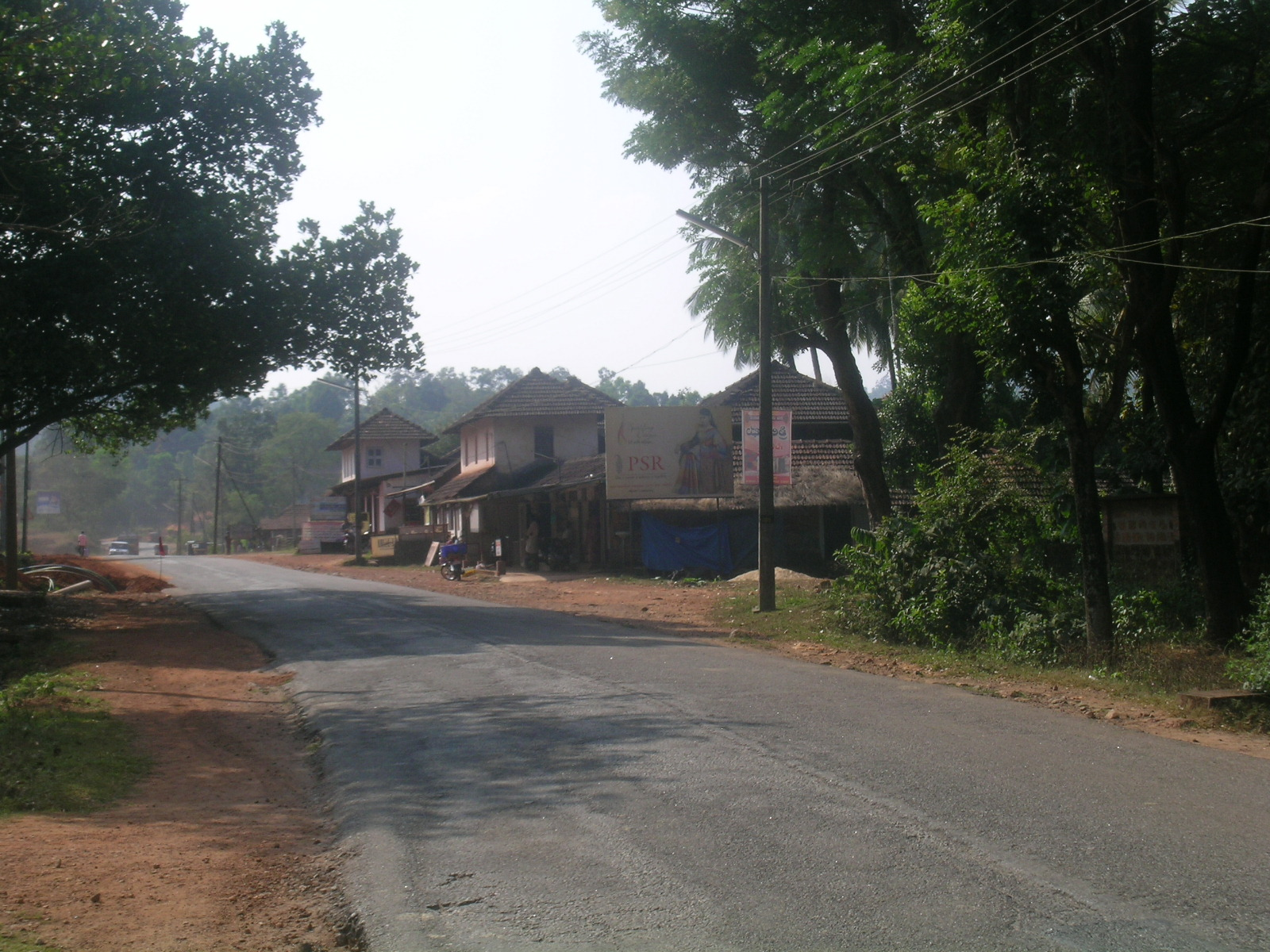
Hamlet of Murathangady

Sanoor is in the Karkala taluk of Udupi district. The Shambhavi River originates here and flows into the Arabian Sea at Mulky. The nearest coastal town is Surathkal, 22 kilometres (14 mi) away by road. The village is on the slopes of the Western Ghats, and its population is concentrated between hills and beside the river. Its forest type is tropical wet evergreen, with cashew plantations on the lower hills. Sanoor has the district's highest rainfall.

The village is administered by a mandala panchayath which includes panchayaths from surrounding villages. Its main street, which runs for about one kilometre, has stores on both sides. A hillock ends the shopping area, followed by a seed farm which sells subsidised rice, mango and jackfruit seeds to farmers.

== Demographics ==
In the 2001 India census, Sanoor had a population of 6,328 (3,008 males and 3,320 females).

== History ==
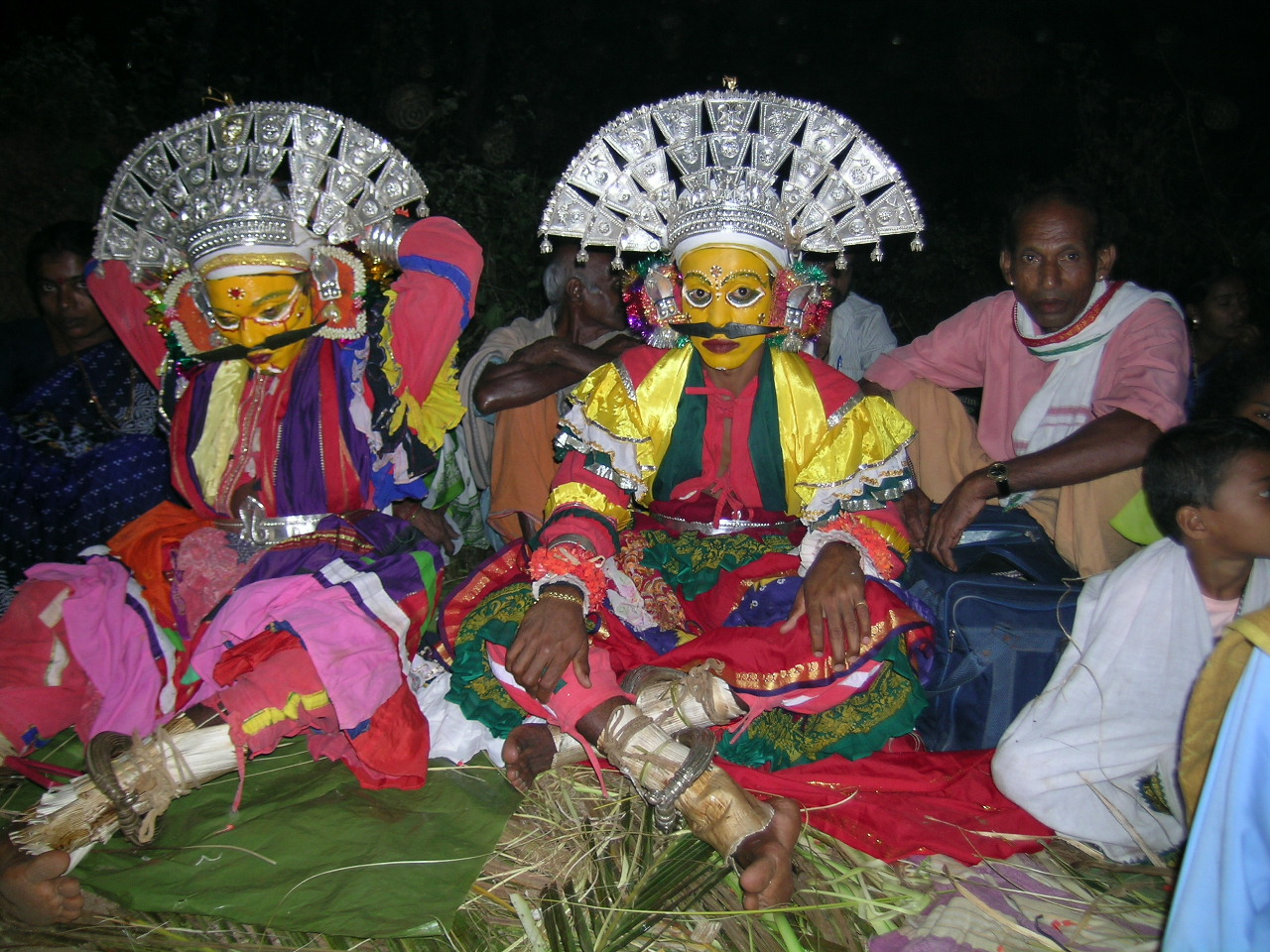
Buta Kola

The region was originally ruled by the Alupa dynasty. Between the 13th and 16th centuries, Sanoor was governed by Bhairarasa Odeyas of the Kalasa-Karkala kingdom. The village has a Siva temple and a Nada Daiva shrine.

The district has two traditions: Buta Kola and Nagaradhane. Buta Kola (spirit worship), a stylised version of the dance of the spirit impersonator, is performed annually at a central shrine.

== Fauna ==
Sanoor, in the Western Ghats, is home to many bird, reptile and mammal species. With only small-scale food-related industries, the area is unpolluted. The commonest birds are crows, pipits and partridges. Other birds include kingfishers, Asian koels, parakeets, black kites, falcons, brahminy kites, treepies, black woodpeckers, whistling thrushes, rock doves, eagle, rufous babblers and peacocks.

Mammal and reptile species include mongoose, jungle cat, leopard, porcupine, wolf, wild pig, monkey and monitor lizard. The last tiger was seen in 1975, when it fell into an unused well. The tiger was rescued and moved to the nearby Dharmasthala Zoo. The village hillocks contain the endangered star tortoise and pangolin.

Russell's viper, saw-scaled viper, cobra and common krait are the four venomous-snake species which are a public concern, and snakebite is still associated with Nagaradhane (snake worship). The krait bite is often painless, and often fatal. Most bites by the other three species are dry bites. The quantity of venom the reptile injects is voluntary, although the venom sac is full.

With deforestation for agriculture, the snake population is increasing. Rats in rice fields are a steady food supply, and humans encounter snakes morning and evening (when the snakes are active).

== Agriculture ==
The region's history of rice cultivation is similar to elsewhere in India. With Aryan migration, the Dravidian people were pushed southward. Aryan wheat culture is restricted to North India; South India retains rice (which may have originated in Bengal) as their staple food. Agriculture in Sanoor depends on the Shambhavi River for irrigation, and dry land is dependent on timely rainfall. Lands are categorised as wet or dry, and the river is diverted in summer for irrigation. Smaller streams generally dry up in midsummer, and monsoon rains fall from May to August. Up to three paddy crops are cultivated annually, depending on land type; dry land yields one crop and wet land two or three, depending on irrigation availability.

Chewing betel leaves with chuna and areca nuts was popular. With growing awareness of its harmful effects, the cultivation of betal vines and the areca nut palm has become isolated. With a scarcity of manpower, the land has been transformed to coconut production (popular in the local cuisine). Rice mills developed in the village during the 1950s, and coconut-oil mills are still in operation. Focus shifted to the cashew industry around 1990, and rice mills depend on supplies from Shimoga and Thirthahalli.

Cashews, native to Venezuela and Brazil, were brought to Goa by the Portuguese in the mid-16th century. The nut may have been favoured by Portuguese sailors because of its stability, portability and nutrient density. Cashews were a part of Portuguese cuisine and were used to make feni. The distilled spirit soon spread throughout the west coast of Goa, Karnataka and Kerala, and sailors brought the cashew to Indonesia and Africa. The slopes of the Western Ghats are favourable for cashews and the native, closely related semecarpus anacardium.

Sanoor has several cashew-processing plants, each employing several hundred people. Processed cashews are exported and, due to increased domestic demand, raw cashews are imported from Indonesia and Africa when the local supply is exhausted. Sanoor also has a cardanol-processing plant which extracts phenolic lipids from the anacardic-acid-rich cashew shells. The lipids are used in chemical industries which produce coating, abrasive and resinous materials.

Vegetables (mainly jackfruit and mangoes) are primarily consumed locally. Mundappa, Totapuri and Neelam are popular mango varieties, and a number of jackfruit varieties are grown.

== Educational institutions ==
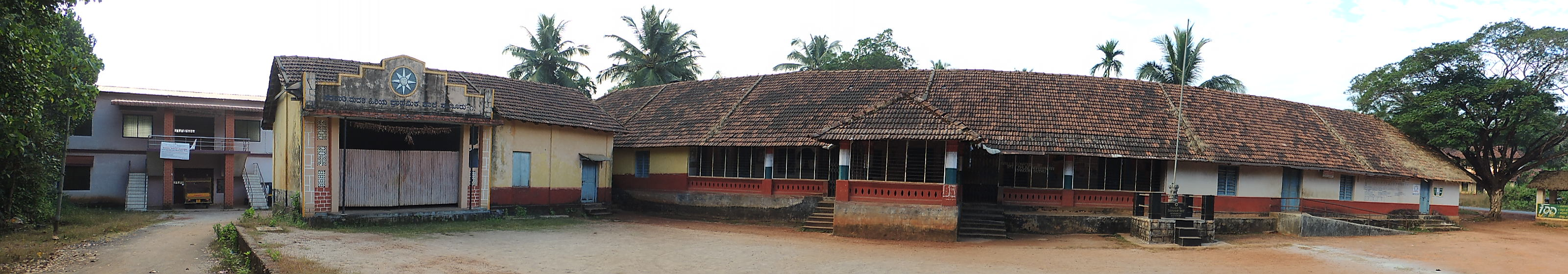
Sanoor Government Higher Primary School

The village has several primary schools. The oldest of the school, St Joseph Aided Primary School, was founded in 1875 AD during the colonial era.

Post independence, Government schools came into existence. Shown here are the two main Kannada medium schools, Government Higher Primary school, and St Joseph Aided Primary School, which gives primary education (form 1 to Form 7).

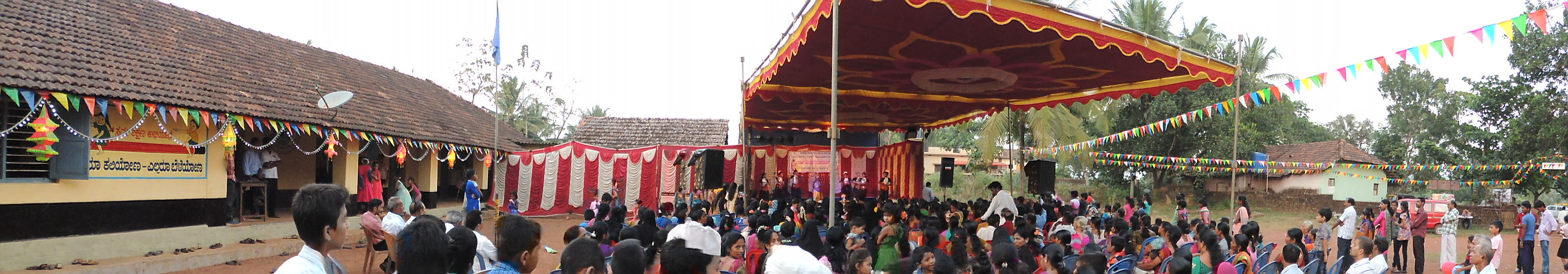
St Joseph Aided Primary School, Sanoor

== Culture ==
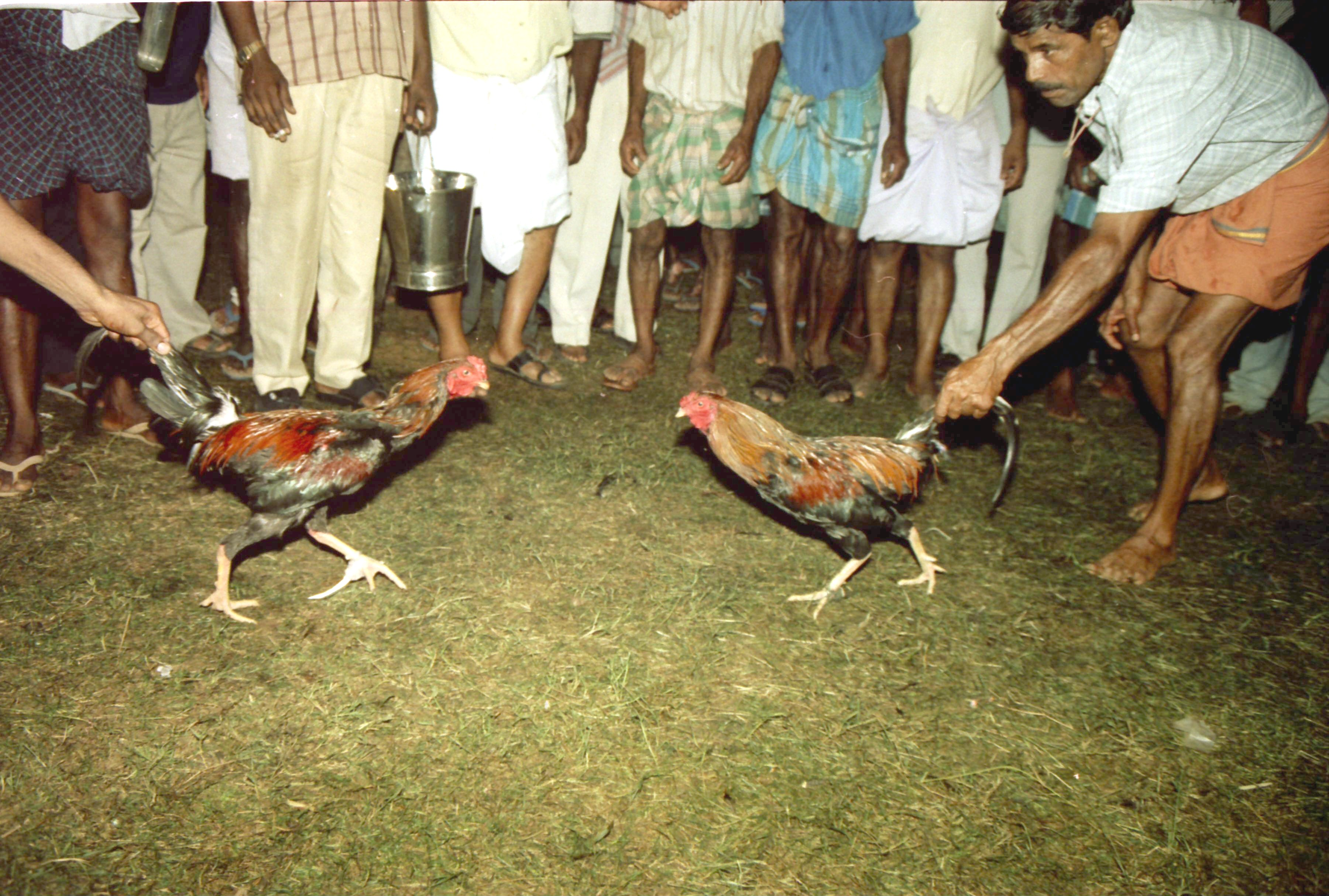
The annual Umanatherna Korida Katta

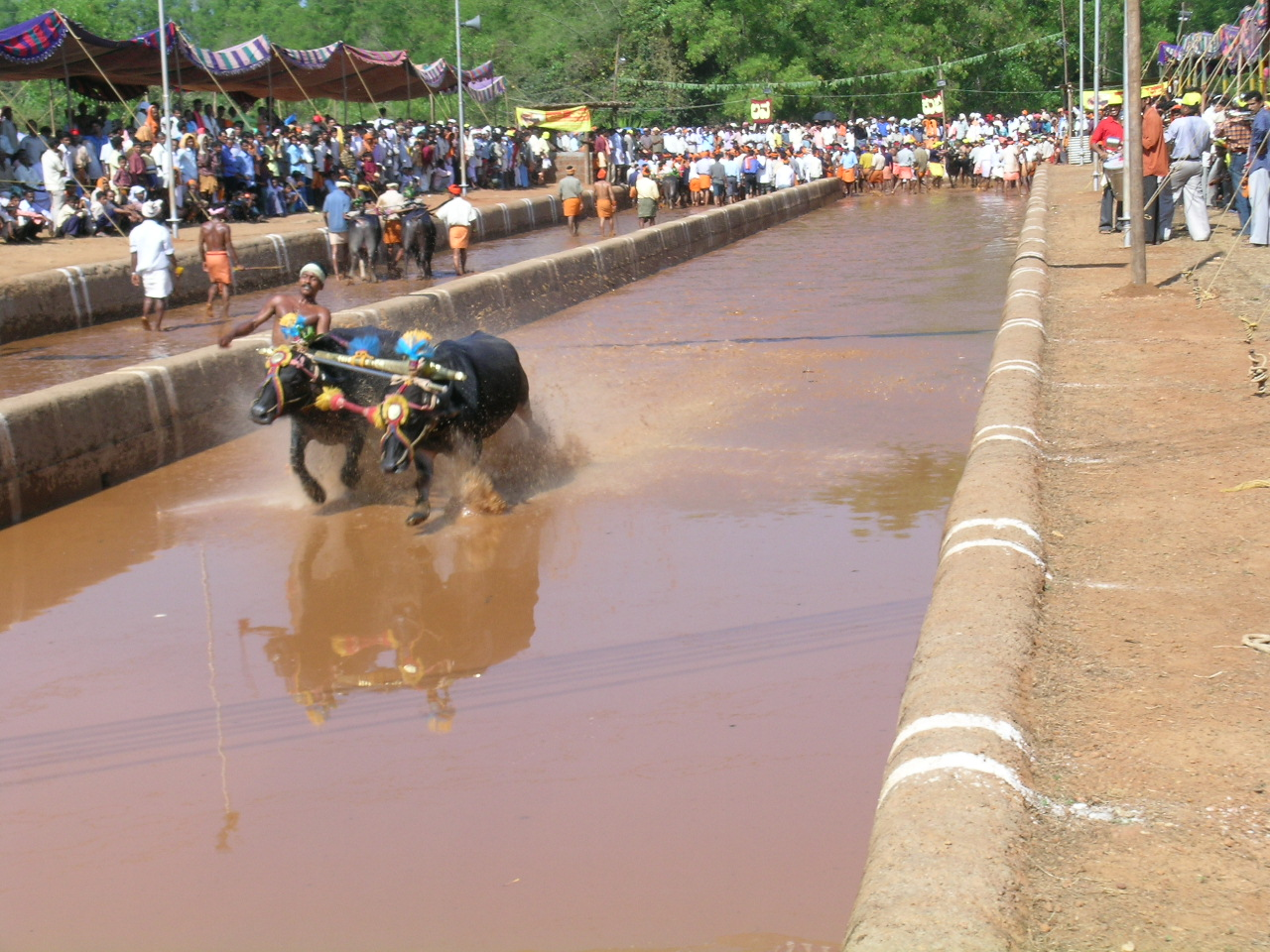
The annual Kambala (water buffalo race)

Yakshagana, Kambala and Korida Katta are the three forms of local entertainment. The Yakshagana Bayalata (open-field musical theater) has become uncommon. cockfighting is an example of the "cultural synthesis of 'little' and 'great' cultures". Also known as Kori Katta, it is popular in the village. Kambala (a bull race) is held in the former South Canara.

== Industry ==
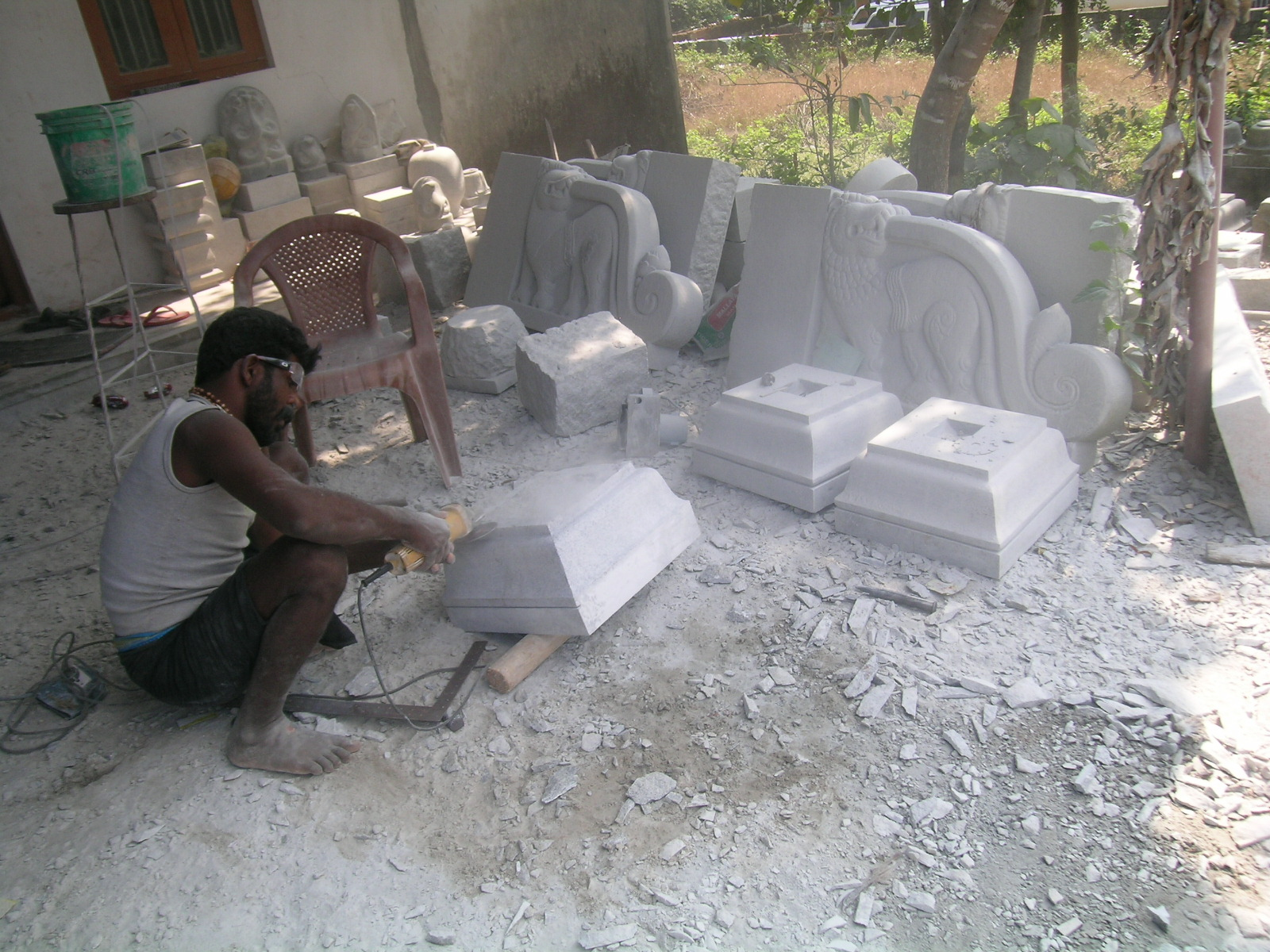
Stone-carving in Sanoor

Granite hills are prominent in the Sanoor region, and several quarries exist. A stone-carving tradition dates back to the Kadamba period. The South Canara region has several granite temples dating to the 7th to 12th centuries which are primarily built in the Gajaprashta style. In addition to monuments, the quarries produce stone for houses and roads.

Beedi (slim, hand-rolled, unfiltered cigarettes) manufacturing was a significant part of the local economy until the 1990s emergence of the cashew industry, with Bharat (No. 30) and Ganesh popular brands. The scene of Tendu leaves sack and Beedis transportation in the bicycles were common to those days. Some beedi processing still takes place in Sanoor.

== Transportation ==
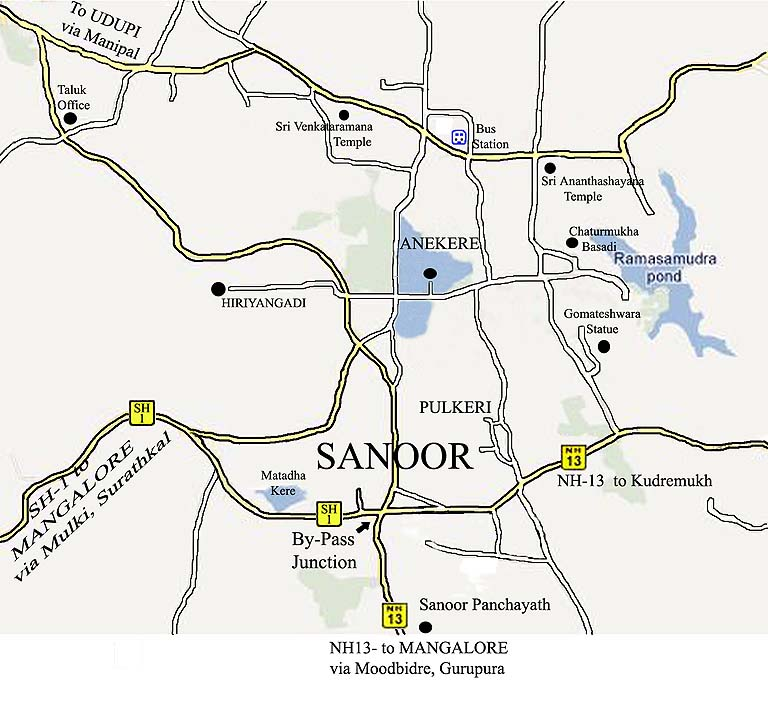
Road map of Sanoor, with old highway numbers

National Highway 50, the former NH-13, passes through Sanoor. Other major roads include State Highway-1 (SH-1) connecting Kalasa-Kudremukha and Padubidri. Rural buses originate from the Karkala bus station (city bus stand); routes are named by source and destination, rather than number. The nearest seaport, airport and city bus station are in Mangalore, 50 kilometres (31 mi) away. A rail station in Udupi, part of the Konkan Railway Thiruvananthapuram-Mumbai route and 37 kilometres (23 mi) from Sanoor, provides service to Goa. Traffic on NH-50 and other roads is heavy, and raised roads with no skirting pose hazards to pedestrians, animals and reptiles.

== Jewelry ==
Like elsewhere in India, local jewellery is similar to the traditional jewelry of the Udupi and neighbouring Dakshina Kannada, Uttara Kannada, Shimoga and Chikmagalur districts. A woman inherits jewelry or receives it at the time of her wedding or other important occasions. Jewelry is a status symbol, and most families pass it from generation to generation. It includes necklaces, earrings, finger, toe and nose rings, bracelets, armlets, pendants and waistbands. Stone-encrusted jewelry is common, with navaratna (nine gems) worn for good fortune.

Kempu bendole, an ear stud made of red stones (such as rubies) is unique to the region; the jimki, a bell-shaped ear jewel set in coloured stones with pearls at the lower end, is a modern variant. Traditional earwear has evolved from the Karna Kundala type (the koppu) to Vajrada Bendole (the Kudkan Jodi), made of natural or synthetic diamonds.

== See also ==
- Karkala
- List of districts of Karnataka
