= Belle, Udupi =

Belle
- village
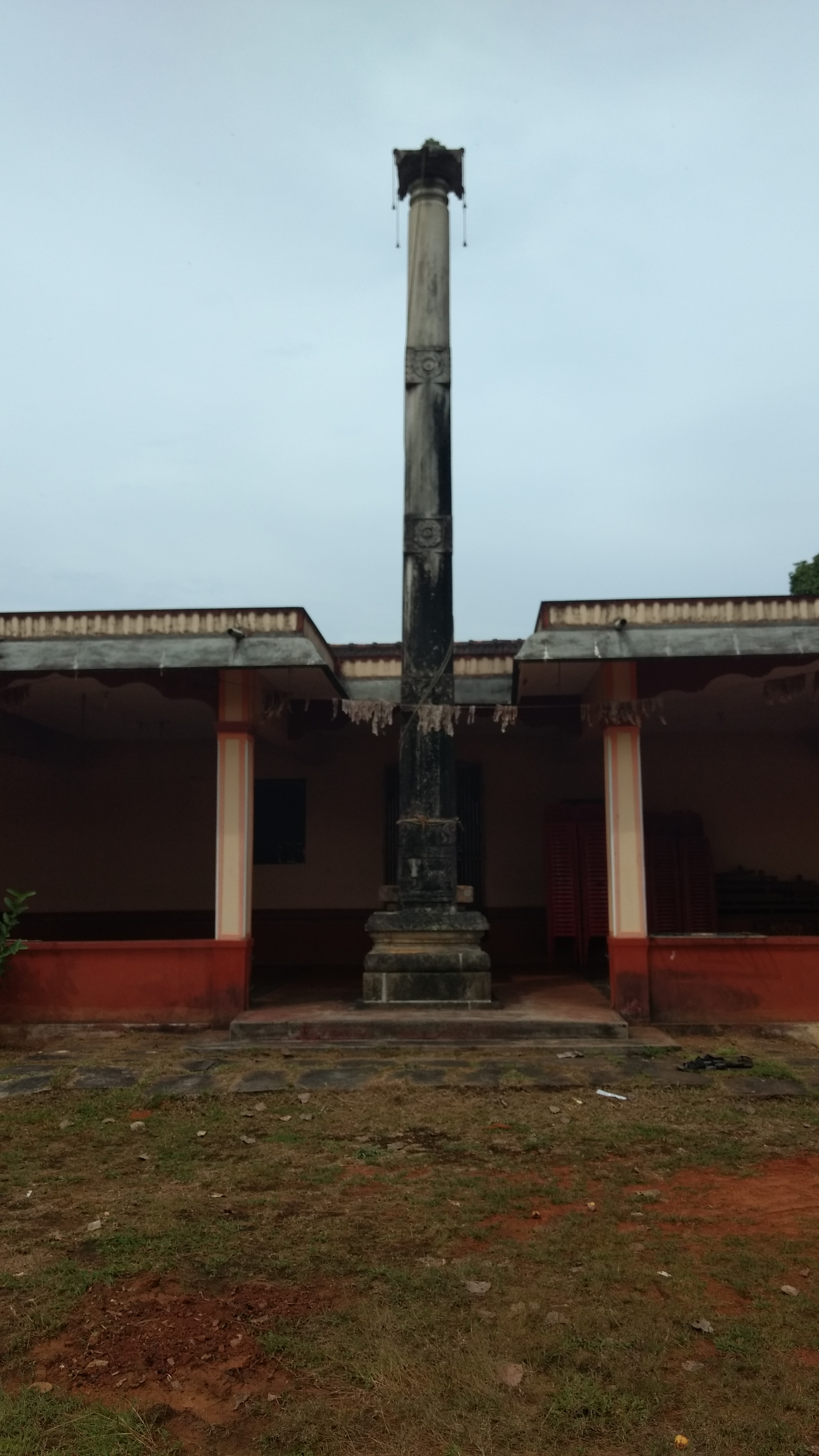
- The Mahalingeshwara Temple in Moodubelle

- Location in Karnataka, India Belle (India)
- Coordinates: 13.281°N 74.833°E
- Country: India
- State: Karnataka
- District: Udupi

Population (2001)
  - Total: 5,324

Languages
  - Official: Tulu, Kannada
- Time zone: UTC+5:30 (IST)
- PIN: 576 120
- Telephone code: 0820
- Vehicle registration: KA-20

Belle (also known as Bollay) is a village in the southern state of Karnataka, India. It is located in the Kaup taluk of Udupi district. The village is known for its historic Moodu-Belle Mahalingeshwara Temple dedicated to Shiva.

== Demographics ==
As of the 2001 India census, Belle had a population of 5324 with 2441 males and 2883 females.

== Economy ==
The village economy is predominantly based on agriculture, with plenty of rice cultivation. Some modern changes are apparent. Cultivation of Jasmine flowers, coconut, arecanut, sugarcane and poultry farming is on the rise.

The weekly market of Belle is on Tuesdays. Belle is connected to Udupi, the district and Taluka headquarters, Karkala, Shirva, and Katapadi by a bus service. The economic prosperity of the village may be due to the employment of a significant number of people from the village in the Gulf countries.

== History and culture ==
=== Moodubelle Mahalingeshwara Temple ===
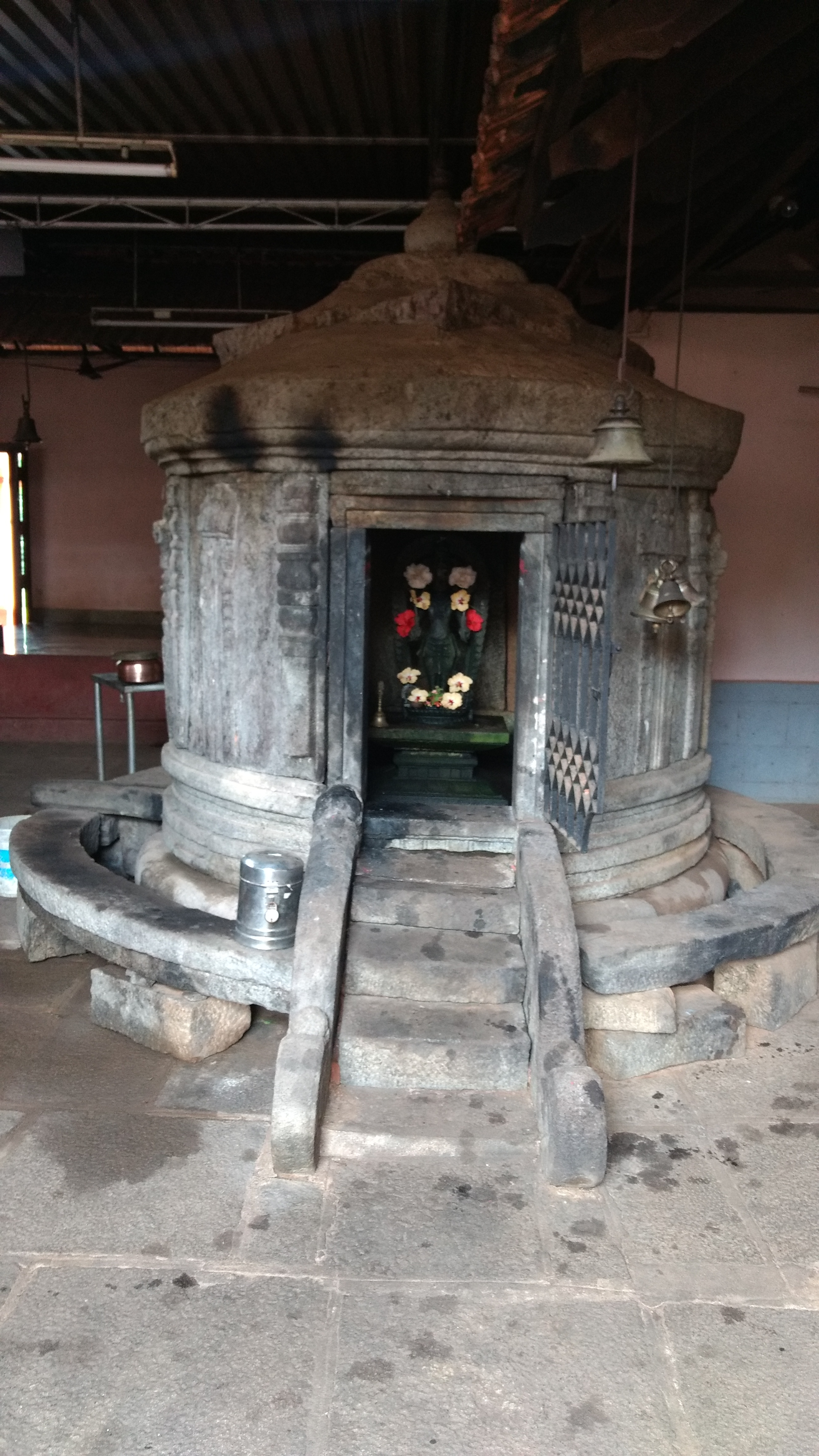
Moodubelle Surya Narayana Shrine made entirely of stone is dated to the 16th century C.E.

The village has a thousand year old temple dedicated to the Hindu deity Mahalingeshwara, which is situated in the Devaragudde area. Ganesha and Surya Narayana are the other two deities worshiped in the temple. The circular shrine of the Solar deity Surya within the temple complex is of historical importance. The idol of the solar deity is a neat image and holds lotuses in both his hands The temple festival called "Utsava" takes place in the second week of February. The temple was established by an aristocratic Bunt woman named Ballalthi of the Belle Ballal clan, the chief land owning feudals of Belle. The Belle Ballala Bunt clan is a cadet branch of the Arasa Ballala rulers of Yerdanadu Aramane, a small medieval feudatory state. The Ballalas claimed descent from the Jaina Santara dynasty who married into the local Alupa dynasty of Tulu Nadu. The Belle Ballala clan were originally followers of Jainism but converted to Shaivism later. They follow the law of matrilineal inheritance (Aliyasantana) and have five manor houses in Belle which are Belle Melmane, Belle Kelamane, Belle Badagumane, Belle Padumane and Belle Moodumane. These five manors owned close to 2000 acres of land in feudal and colonial times before land reforms were implemented in the 1960s

A medieval wooden image of one of the chiefs (Ballal) of Belle lies in a shrine near the Kelamane House.

Two branches of the clan exist outside Belle: Mallar Guthu (erstwhile feudal lords of Mallar village) and Sanoor Guthu (erstwhile Potail (administrators) of Sanoor Village). Moodubelle Kambala is held at Belle Kelamane House in November every year. Mallarguthu Sankappa Shetty, a member of this clan built the Kalya Marigudi Temple in Kaup.

=== Padubelle Mahalingeshwara Temple ===
The western part of the village also has an old temple dedicated to the Hindu deity Mahalingeshwara Shiva. The temple was recently renovated.

=== St. Lawrence Church ===
A Roman Catholic Church which is also one of the biggest churches in the Udupi Diocese. It is place of worship for a large Konkani speaking Catholic population. An annual festival or the parish feast of St. Lawrence Church, also known as 'Santhmary' takes place every year on the first Tuesday, Wednesday of January. People from many communities go to the church and celebrate the feast.

== Education ==
The village has a primary school, a high school, and a junior college. There is an English language school that also offers primary and high school Education.

Educational Institutes in the area include: St. Lawrence College, St. Lawrence High School (Kannada), Bharathi Higher Primary School (KunthalaNagara), Belle Church Aided Higher Primary School (Kannada), Jnanaganga College (Nellikatte).

== Geography ==
Belle village has been geographically separated into two parts: Moodubelle (Belle - East), Padubelle (Belle-West). A river, Badra Amma (also known as Papanashini), flows between Moodu Belle and Padu Belle. Moodu Belle village is around 12 km from District Headquarters Udupi by road.

== People ==
Tulu, Konkani and Kannada are widely spoken. Tulu is the lingua franca in the area as it is in most of Tulu Nadu.

== Transport ==
The nearest airport is Mangalore International Airport. The nearest railway station is at Udupi.

By road, Moodubelle lies in State Highway SH-37 and it is well connected by road network.
