= Adipostatin A =

Names
- Preferred IUPAC name 5-Pentadecylbenzene-1,3-diol
- Other names Cardol; 5-n- pentadecylcatechol Pentadecylresorcinol; 5-Pentadecylresorcinol

Identifiers
CAS Number	3158-56-3
3D model (JSmol)	Interactive image
ChemSpider	69081
ECHA InfoCard	100.019.636
PubChem CID	76617
UNII	U1FU33YCG0
CompTox Dashboard (EPA)	DTXSID7062875
- InChI: InChI=1S/C21H36O2/c1-2-3-4-5-6-7-8-9-10-11-12-13-14-15-19-16-20(22)18-21(23)17-19/h16-18,22-23H,2-15H2,1H3 Key: KVVSCMOUFCNCGX-UHFFFAOYSA-N; InChI=1/C21H36O2/c1-2-3-4-5-6-7-8-9-10-11-12-13-14-15-19-16-20(22)18-21(23)17-19/h16-18,22-23H,2-15H2,1H3 Key: KVVSCMOUFCNCGX-UHFFFAOYAU
- SMILES: CCCCCCCCCCCCCCCC1=CC(=CC(=C1)O)O

Properties
Chemical formula	C_{21}H_{36}O_{2}
Molar mass	320.517 g·mol^{−1}
- Except where otherwise noted, data are given for materials in their standard state (at 25 °C [77 °F], 100 kPa). Infobox references

Adipostatin A is an alkylresorcinol, a type of phenolic lipids composed of long aliphatic chains and phenolic rings. Chemically, it is similar in structure to urushiol, the irritant found in poison ivy.

Adipostatin A can be found in Ginkgo biloba fruits as well as in Streptomyces cyaneus. It is also found in cashew nutshell liquid (Anacardium occidentale), in Anacardium othonianum and in Ardisia elliptica.

It is an inhibitor of glycerol-3-phosphate dehydrogenase.
