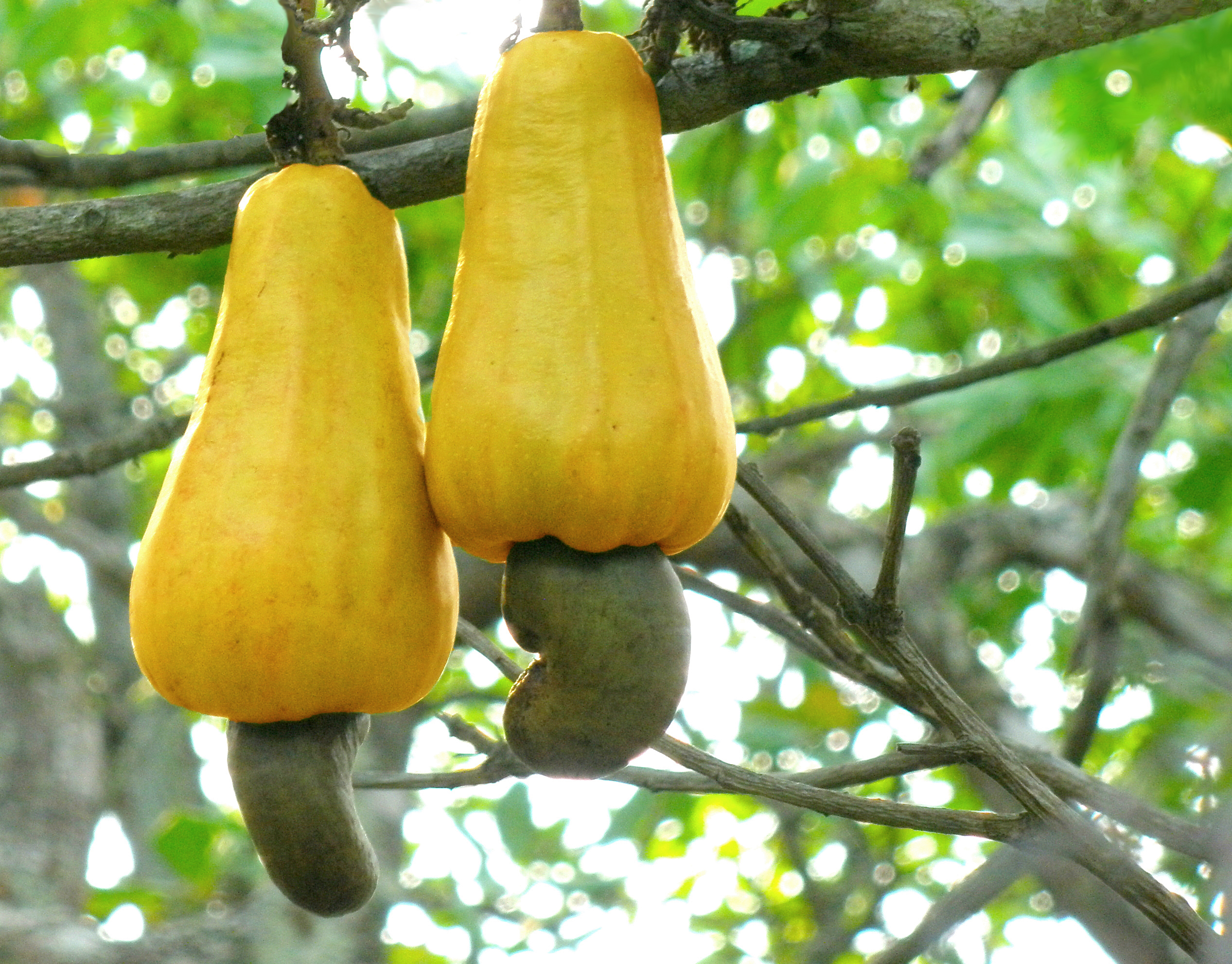
- Ripe fruit and attached drupe, which contains the edible seed

Conservation status
- Least Concern (IUCN 3.1)

Scientific classification
- Kingdom: Plantae
- Clade: Tracheophytes
- Clade: Angiosperms
- Clade: Eudicots
- Clade: Rosids
- Order: Sapindales
- Family: Anacardiaceae
- Genus: Anacardium
- Species: A. occidentale

Binomial name
- Anacardium occidentale L.

= Cashew =

Flowering plant in the family Anacardiaceae

Cashew is the common name of a tropical evergreen tree Anacardium occidentale, in the family Anacardiaceae. It is the source of the cashew nut and the cashew apple. The tree can grow as tall as 14 meters (46 feet).

Cashews are native to tropical South America. Portuguese explorers encountered them in the 16th century and spread them to India and other tropical regions of the world. The dwarf cultivars, growing up to 6 m (20 ft), are the most profitable, maturing sooner and producing greater yields. In 2023, 3.9 million tons of cashew nuts were harvested globally, led by the Ivory Coast and India.

The nut shell and raw seed are toxic, but the nut is edible once shelled and roasted or steamed. Treated cashews are eaten on their own as a snack, used in recipes, or processed into cashew cheese or cashew butter. The cashew apple, an accessory fruit, is a light reddish to yellow fruit, the pulp and juice of which can be processed into a sweet, astringent fruit drink or fermented and distilled into liquor. Additionally, derivatives from the shell are used in products such as varnishes, lubricant, and paints.

== Description ==
The cashew tree is large and evergreen, growing to 14 metres (46 feet) tall, with a short, often irregularly shaped trunk. The leaves are spirally arranged, leathery textured, elliptic to obovate, 4–22 centimetres (1 1/2–8 3/4 inches) long and 2–15 cm (3/4–6 in) broad, with smooth margins. The flowers are produced in a panicle or corymb up to 26 cm (10 in) long; each flower is small, pale green at first, then turning reddish, with five slender, acute petals 7–15 millimeters (1/4–5/8 in) long. The largest cashew tree in the world covers an area around 7,500 m^{2} (81,000 ft^{2}) and is located in Parnamirim, Brazil.

The fruit of the cashew tree is an accessory fruit (sometimes called a pseudocarp or false fruit). What appears to be the fruit is an oval or pear-shaped structure, a hypocarpium, that develops from the pedicel and the receptacle of the cashew flower. Called the cashew apple, better known in Central America as marañón, it ripens into a yellow or red structure about 5–11 cm (2–4 1/4 in) long.

The true fruit of the cashew tree is a kidney-shaped or boxing glove-shaped drupe that grows at the end of the cashew apple. The drupe first develops on the tree and then the pedicel expands to become the cashew apple. The drupe becomes the true fruit, a single shell-encased seed, which is often considered a nut in the culinary sense. The seed is surrounded by a double-shell that contains an allergenic phenolic resin, anacardic acid - which is a potent skin irritant chemically related to the better-known and also toxic allergenic oil urushiol, which is found in the related poison ivy and lacquer tree.

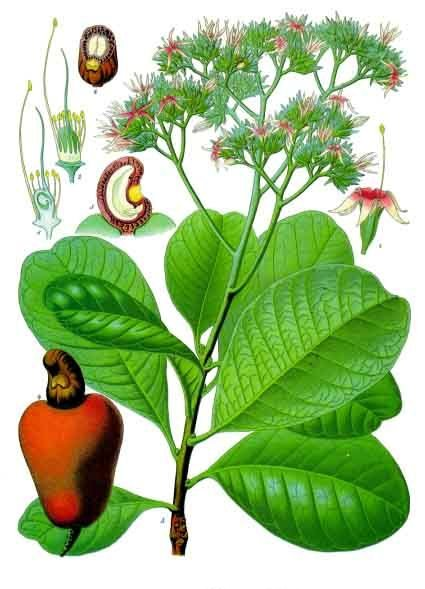
Botanical illustration

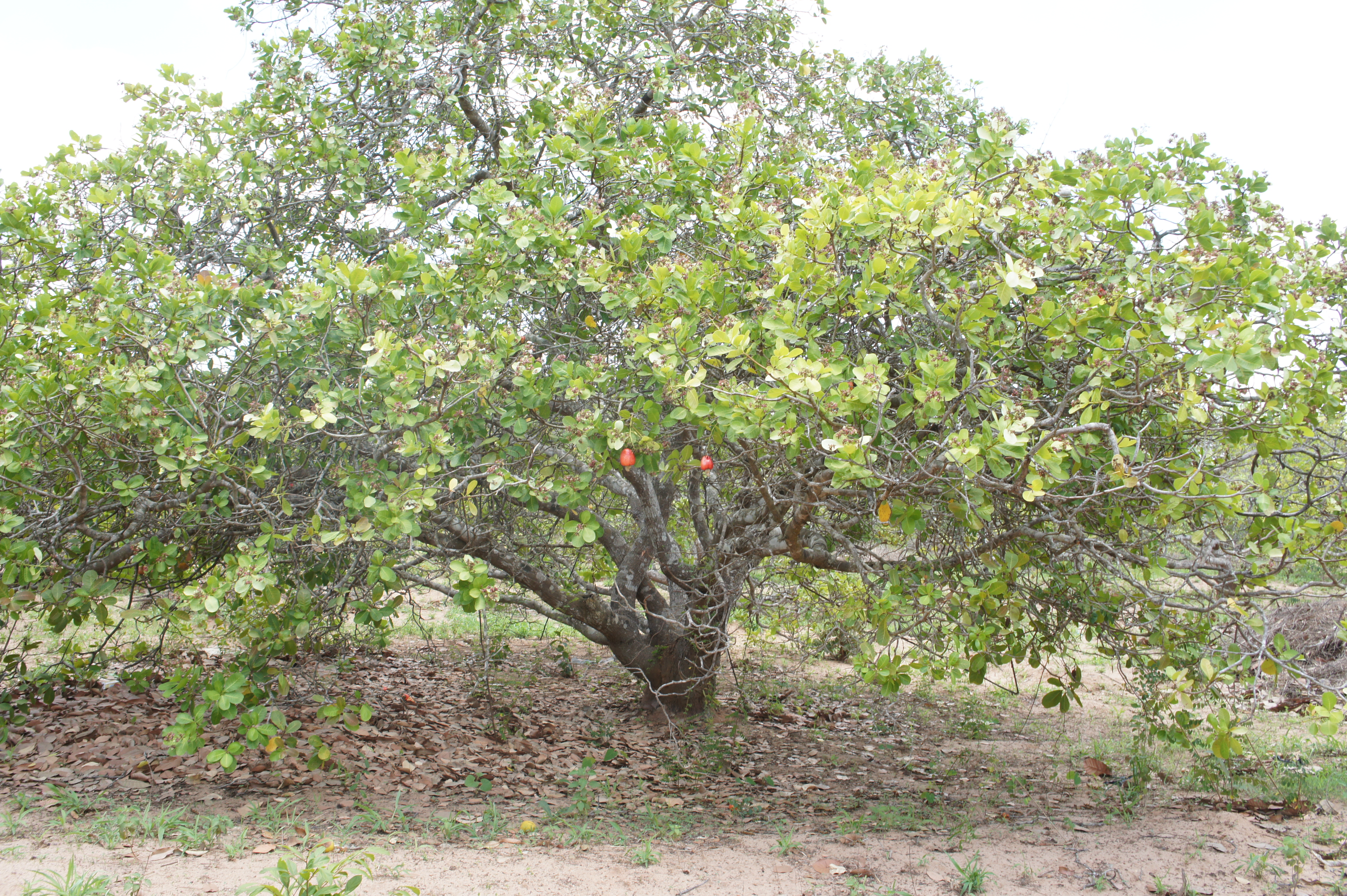
Tree in Mozambique, southeastern Africa

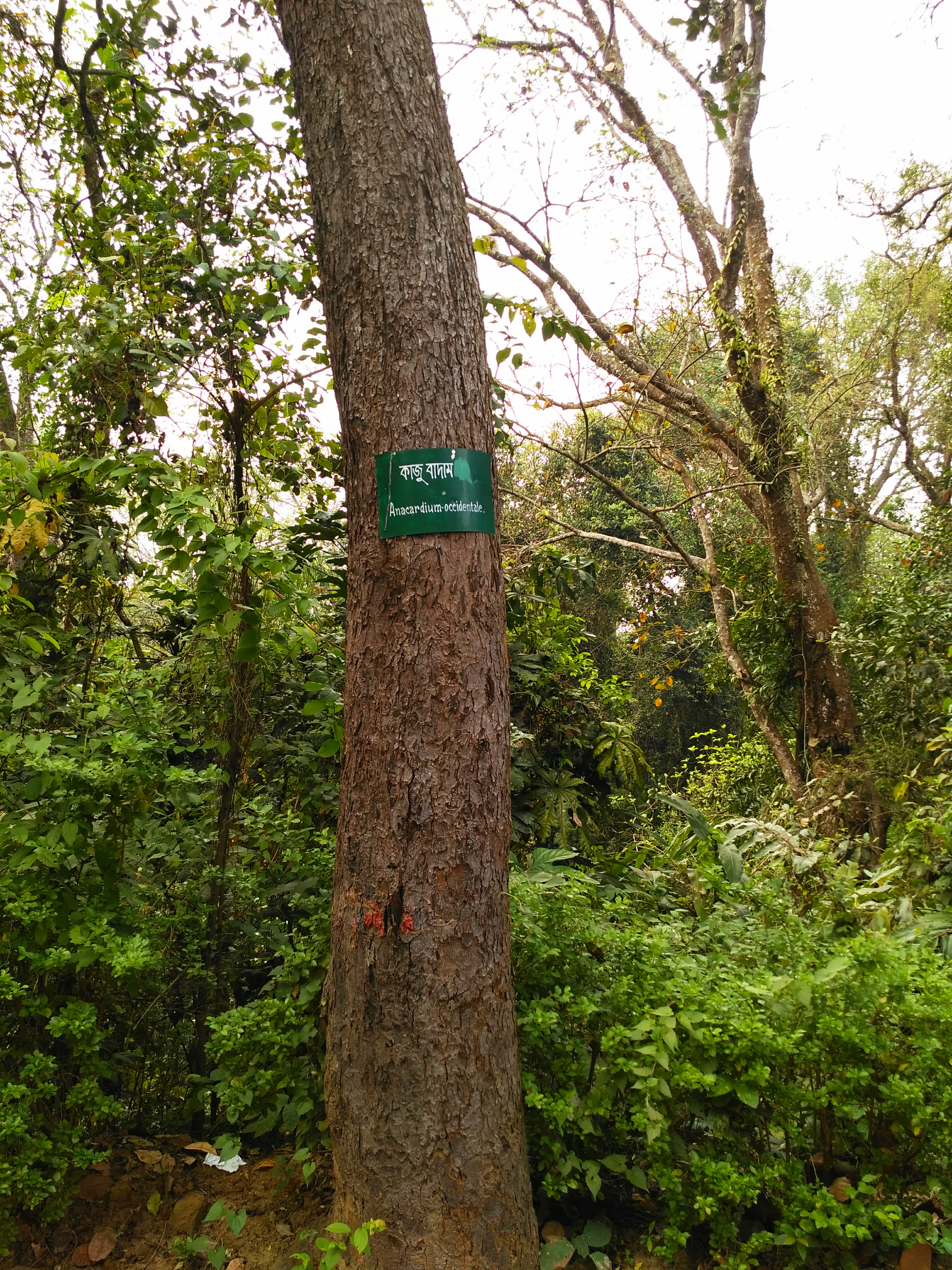
Trunk in Bangladesh

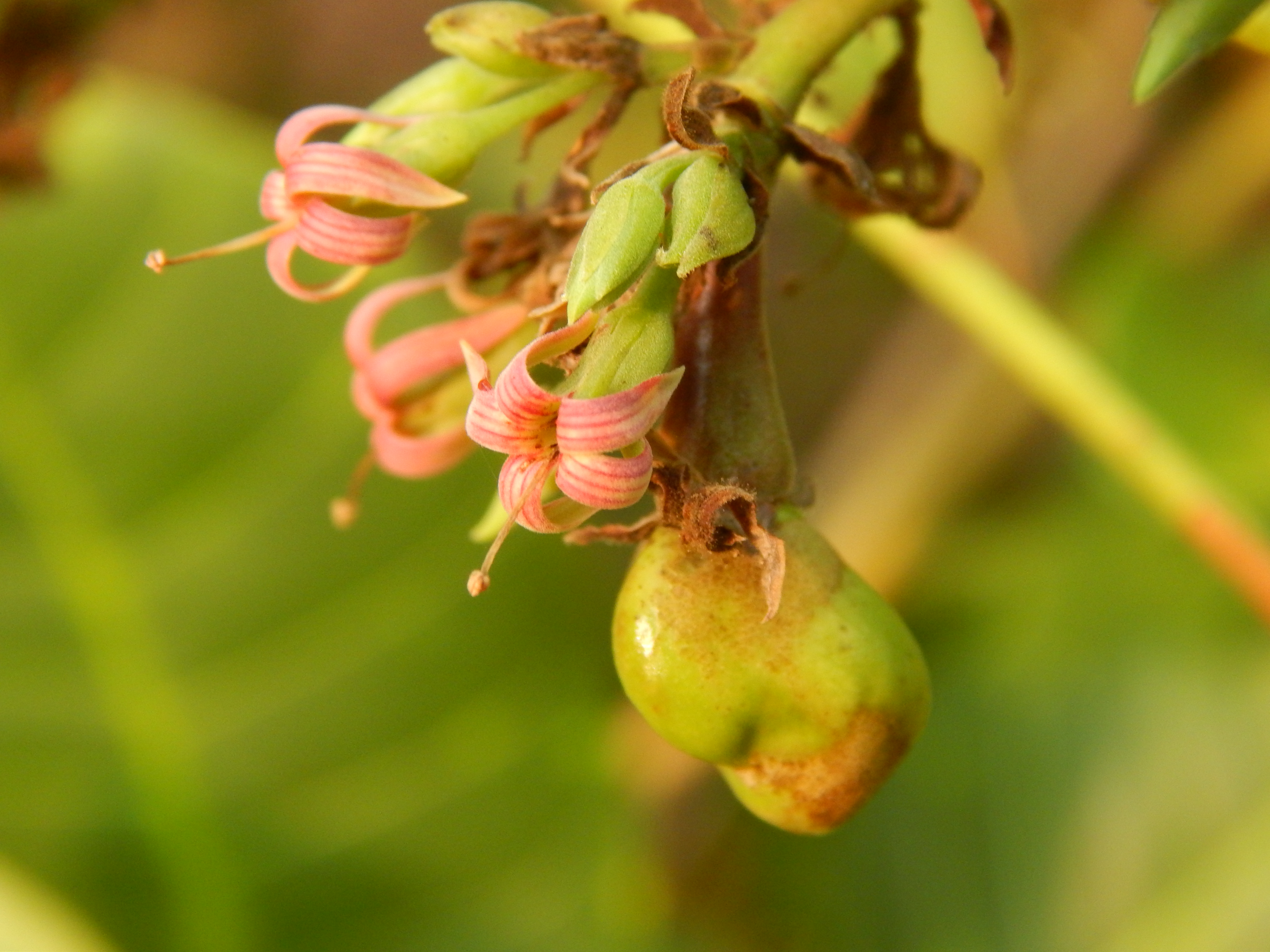
Flowers

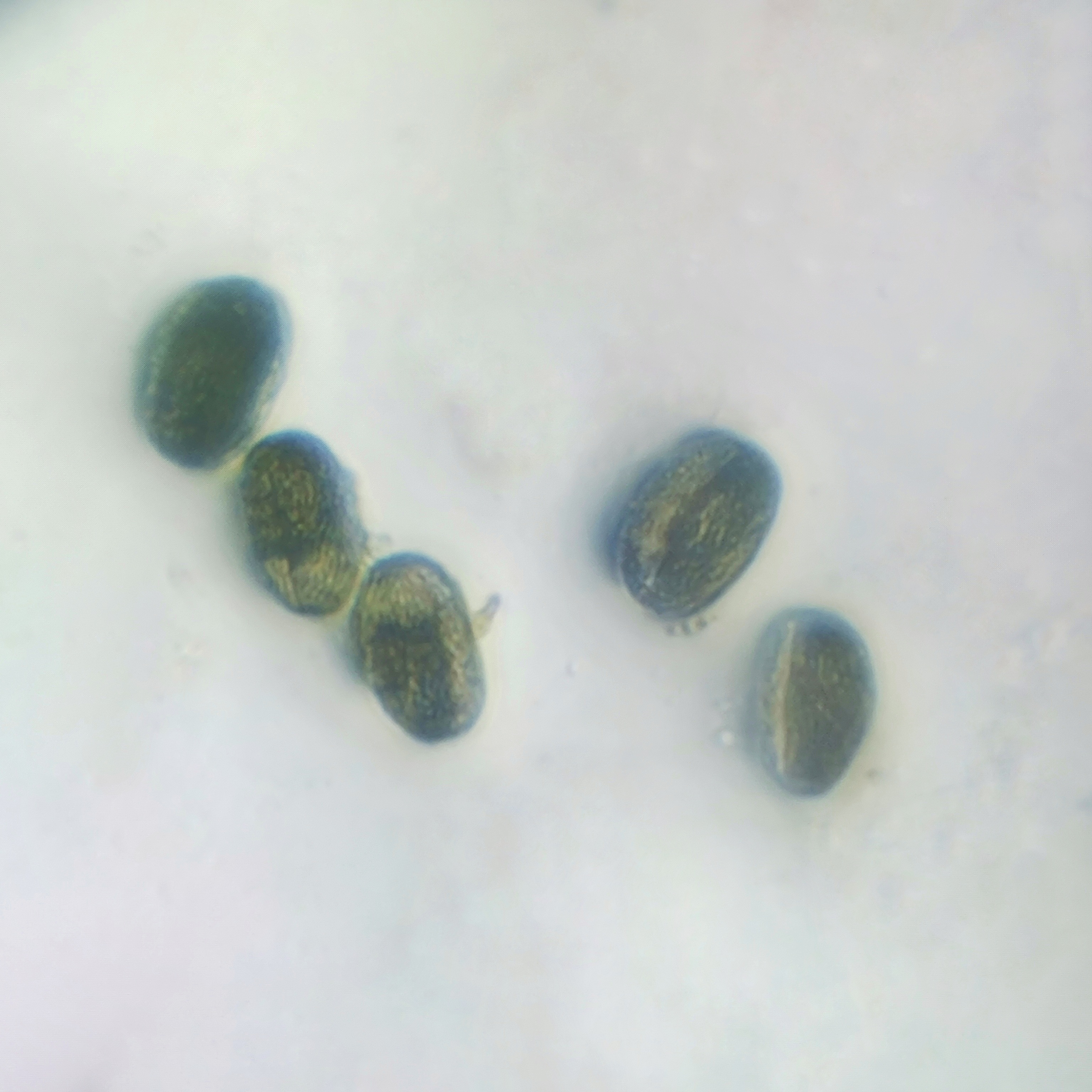
Pollen grains of Cashew tree

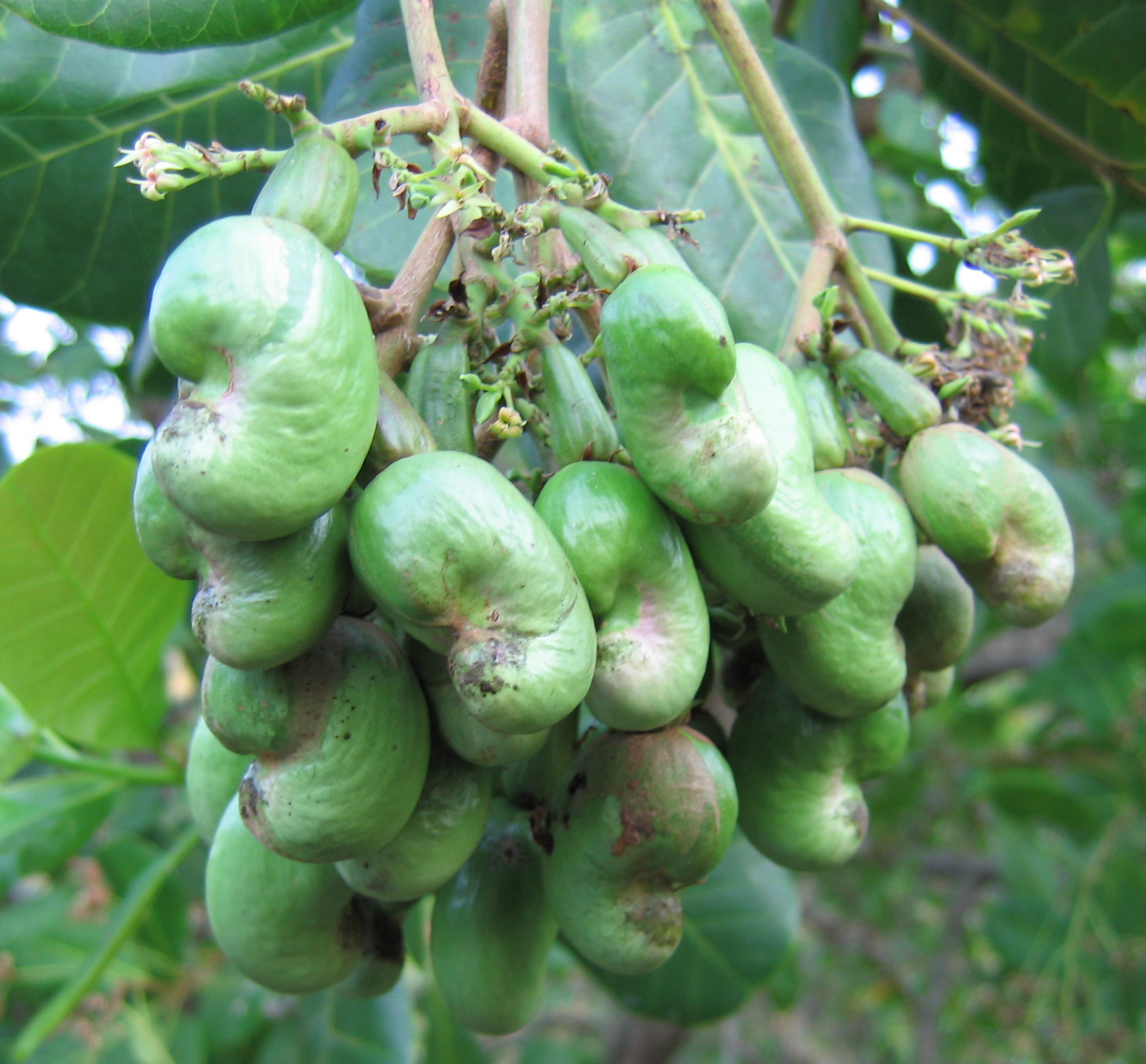
Young fruits

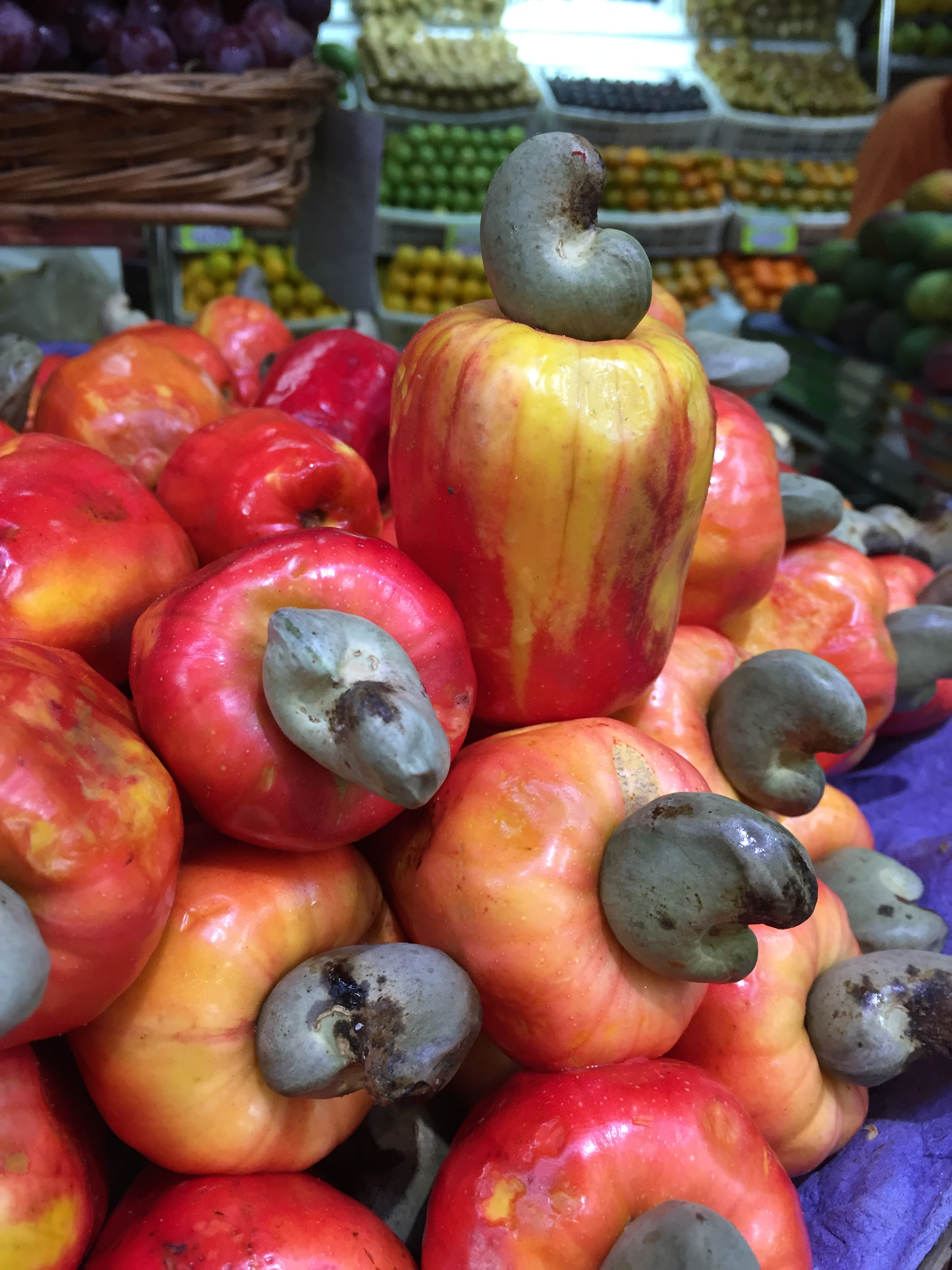
Fruits sold as produce

== Etymology ==
The English name derives from the Portuguese name for the fruit of the cashew tree: Caju (Portuguese pronunciation: [kaˈʒu]), also known as acaju, which itself is from the Tupi word acajú, literally meaning "nut that produces itself".

The generic name Anacardium is composed of the Greek prefix ana- (ἀνά-, aná, 'up, upward'), the Greek cardia (καρδία, kardía, 'heart'), and the Neo-Latin suffix -ium. It possibly refers to the heart shape of the fruit, to "the top of the fruit stem" or to the seed. The word anacardium was earlier used to refer to Semecarpus anacardium (the marking nut tree) before Carl Linnaeus transferred it to the cashew; both plants are in the same family. The epithet occidentale derives from the Western (or Occidental) world.

== Distribution and habitat ==
The species is native to tropical South America and later was distributed around the world in the 1500s by Portuguese explorers. Portuguese colonists in Brazil began exporting cashew nuts as early as the 1550s. The Portuguese took it to Goa, formerly Estado da Índia Portuguesa in India, between 1560 and 1565. From there, it spread throughout Southeast Asia and eventually Africa.

== Cultivation ==
Cashew production 2024, tonnes
Ivory Coast	944,673
India	794,910
Tanzania	528,262
Vietnam	306,185
Ghana	218,575
World	4,241,104
Source: FAOSTAT of the United Nations

The cashew tree is cultivated in the tropics between 25°N and 25°S, and is well-adapted to hot lowland areas with a pronounced dry season, where the mango and tamarind trees also thrive. The traditional cashew tree is tall, up to 14 m (46 ft), requiring three years from planting before it starts production, and eight years before economic harvests.

More recent breeds, such as the dwarf cashew trees, are up to 6 m (20 ft) tall and start producing after the first year, with economic yields after three years. The cashew nut yields for the traditional tree are about 0.25 t (0.25 long tons; 0.28 short tons) per hectare, in contrast to over a ton per hectare for the dwarf variety. Grafting and other modern tree management technologies improve and sustain cashew nut yields in commercial orchards.

=== Production ===
In 2024, world production of cashews (in shell) was 4.2 million tonnes, led by Ivory Coast and India, having 41% of the total when combined (table).

Cashew nut yields

Cashew nut production

=== Trade ===
Almost all cashews produced in Africa between 2000 and 2019 were exported as raw nuts, which are much less profitable than shelled nuts. One of the goals of the African Cashew Alliance is to promote Africa's cashew processing capabilities to improve the profitability of Africa's cashew industry. Half of the world's cashews were sold by American retailer Costco, as of 2025.

== Toxicity ==
Some people are allergic to cashews, but they are a less frequent allergen than other tree nuts or peanuts. For up to 6% of children and 3% of adults, consuming cashews may cause allergic reactions, ranging from mild discomfort to life-threatening anaphylaxis. These allergies are triggered by the proteins found in tree nuts, and cooking often does not remove or change these proteins. Reactions to cashew and tree nuts can also occur as a consequence of hidden nut ingredients or traces of nuts that may inadvertently be introduced during food processing, handling, or manufacturing.

The shell of the cashew nut contains oil compounds that can cause contact dermatitis similar to poison ivy, primarily resulting from the phenolic lipids, anacardic acids, and cardanol. Because it can cause dermatitis, cashews are typically not sold in the shell to consumers. Cardanol, which can be readily and inexpensively extracted from the waste shells, is under research for its potential applications in nanomaterials and biotechnology.

== Uses ==
=== Nutrition ===
Cashews, raw
Nutritional value per 100 g (3.5 oz)
- Energy: 553 kcal (2,310 kJ)
- Carbohydrates: 30.19 g
- Starch: 23.49 g
- Sugars lactose: 5.91 g 0.00 g
- Dietary fiber: 3.3 g
- Fat: 43.85 g
- Saturated: 7.783 g
- Monounsaturated: 23.797 g
- Polyunsaturated: 7.845 g
- Protein: 18.22 g
Vitamins and minerals
Vitamins	Quantity %DV^{†}
Vitamin A	0 IU
Thiamine (B1)	35% 0.423 mg
Riboflavin (B2)	4% 0.058 mg
Niacin (B3)	7% 1.062 mg
Pantothenic acid (B5)	17% 0.86 mg
Vitamin B6	25% 0.417 mg
Folate (B9)	6% 25 μg
Vitamin B12	0% 0 μg
Vitamin C	1% 0.5 mg
Vitamin D	0% 0 μg
Vitamin E	6% 0.90 mg
Vitamin K	28% 34.1 μg
Minerals	Quantity %DV^{†}
Calcium	3% 37 mg
Copper	244% 2.2 mg
Iron	37% 6.68 mg
Magnesium	70% 292 mg
Manganese	72% 1.66 mg
Phosphorus	47% 593 mg
Potassium	22% 660 mg
Selenium	36% 19.9 μg
Sodium	1% 12 mg
Zinc	53% 5.78 mg
- Other constituents: Quantity
- Water: 5.20 g
- Link to USDA Database entry
- ^{†}Percentages estimated using US recommendations for adults, except for potassium, which is estimated based on expert recommendation from the National Academies.

Raw cashew nuts are 5% water, 30% carbohydrates, 44% fat, and 18% protein (table). In a reference amount of 100 g (3.5 oz), raw cashews provide 553 kilocalories and are rich sources (20% or more of the Daily Value, DV) of several dietary minerals, B vitamins, and vitamin K (table).

=== Nut and shell ===
Culinary uses for cashew seeds in snacking and cooking are similar to those for all tree seeds called nuts.

Cashews are commonly used in Indian cuisine, whole for garnishing sweets or curries, or ground into a paste that forms a base of sauces for curries (e.g., korma), or some sweets (e.g., kaju barfi). It is also used in powdered form in the preparation of several Indian sweets and desserts. In Goan cuisine, both roasted and raw kernels of Goa Kaju are used whole for making curries and sweets. Cashews are also used in Thai and Chinese cuisines, generally in whole form. In the Philippines, cashew is a known product of Antipolo and is eaten with suman. The province of Pampanga also has a sweet dessert called turrones de casuy, which is cashew marzipan wrapped in white wafers. In Indonesia, roasted and salted cashews are called kacang mete or kacang mede, while the cashew apple is called jambu monyet (lit. 'monkey rose apple').

In the 21st century, cashew cultivation increased in several African countries to meet the manufacturing demands for cashew milk, a plant milk alternative to dairy milk. In Mozambique, bolo polana is a cake prepared using powdered cashews and mashed potatoes as the main ingredients. This dessert is common in South Africa.

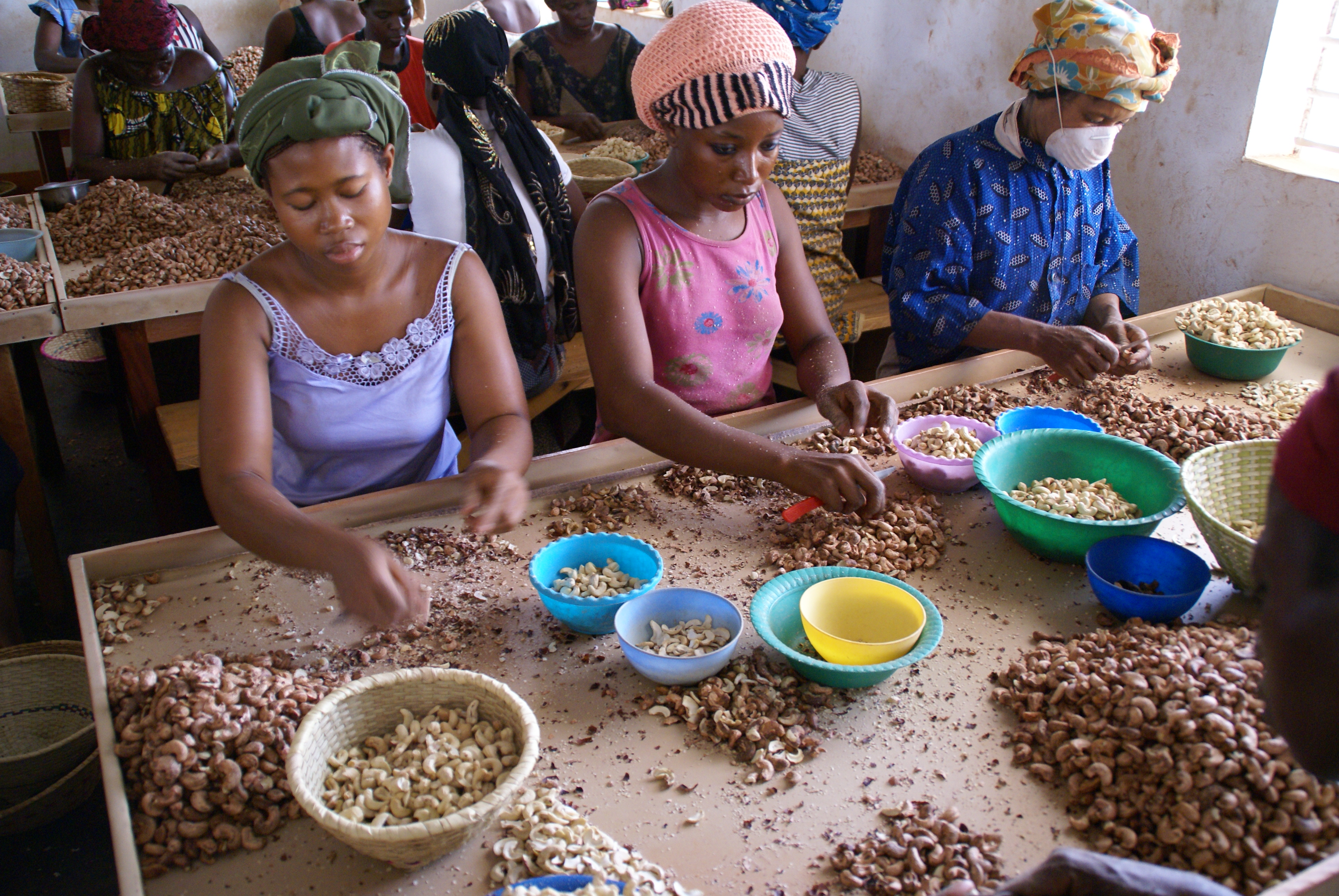
Women shelling cashews in Burkina Faso, West Africa

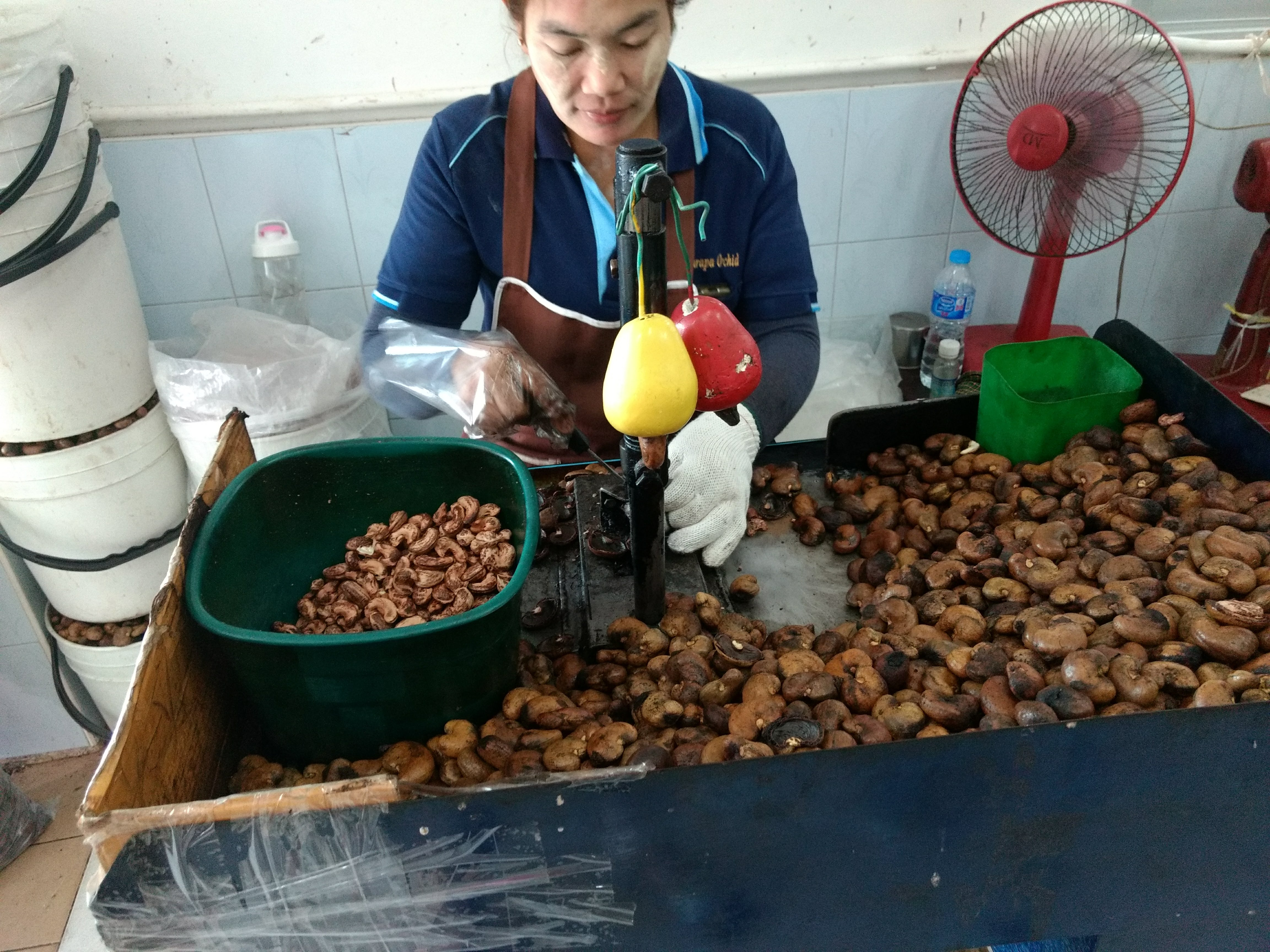
A woman using a machine to shell cashews in Thailand

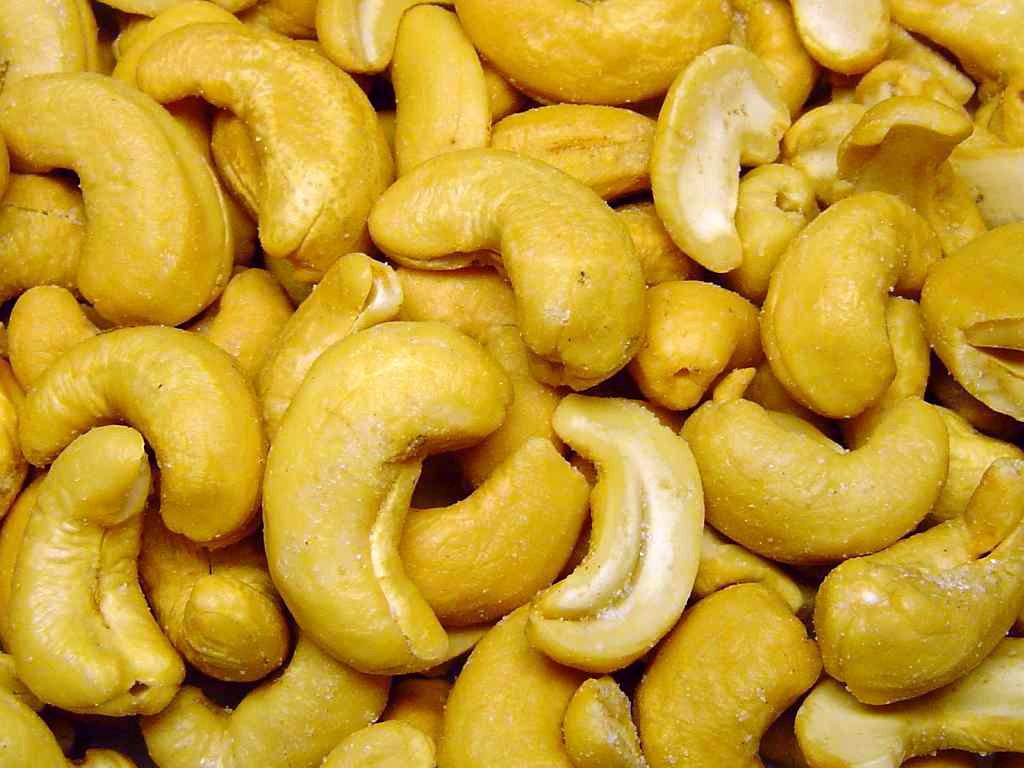
Salted, roasted cashew nuts

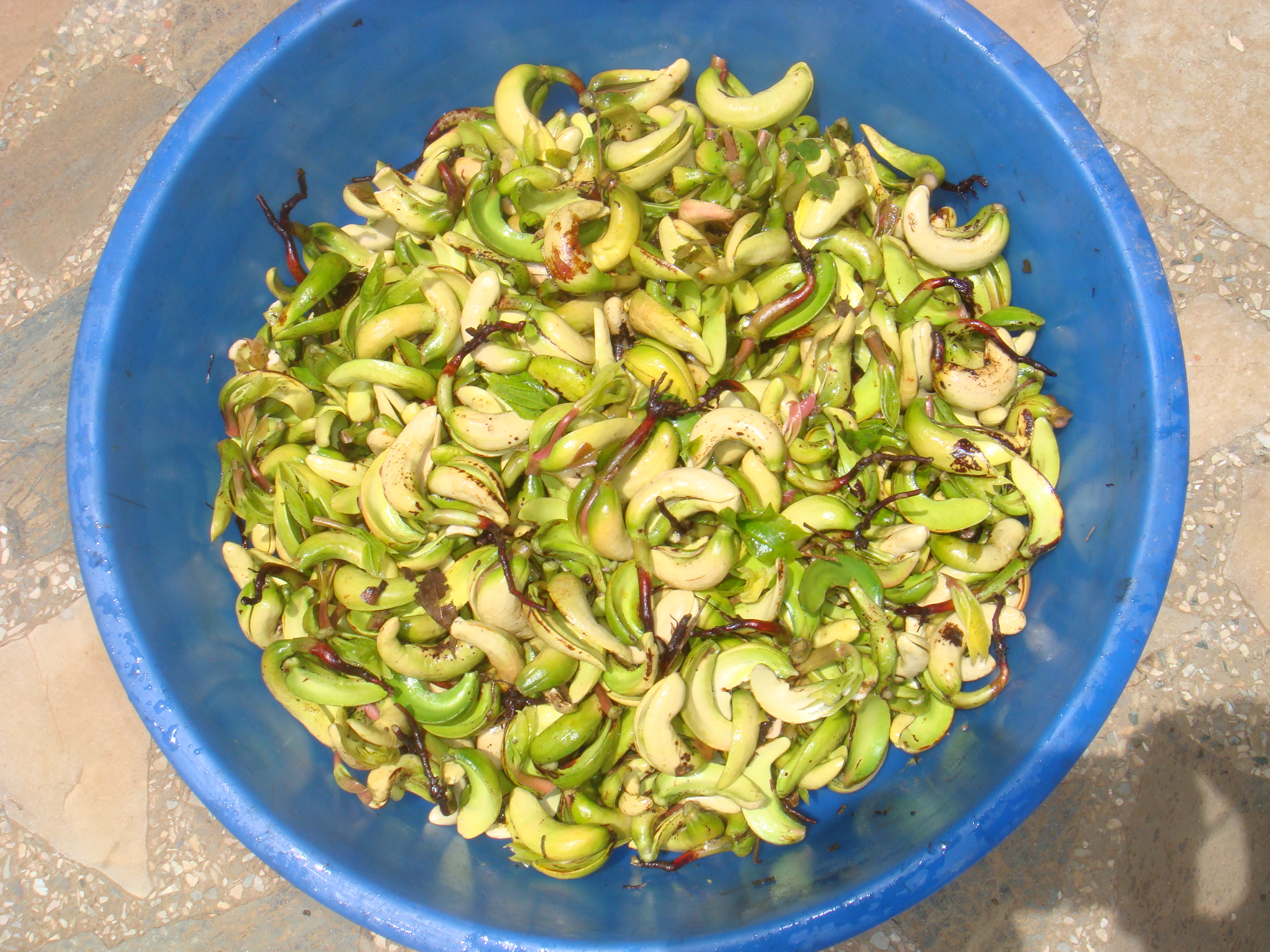
Cashew sprouts are eaten raw or cooked.

=== Husk ===
The cashew nut kernel has a slight curvature and two cotyledons, each representing around 20–25% of the weight of the nut. It is encased in a reddish-brown membrane called a husk, which accounts for approximately 5% of the total nut. Cashew nut husk is used in emerging industrial applications, such as an adsorbent, composites, biopolymers, dyes, and enzyme synthesis.

=== Apple ===
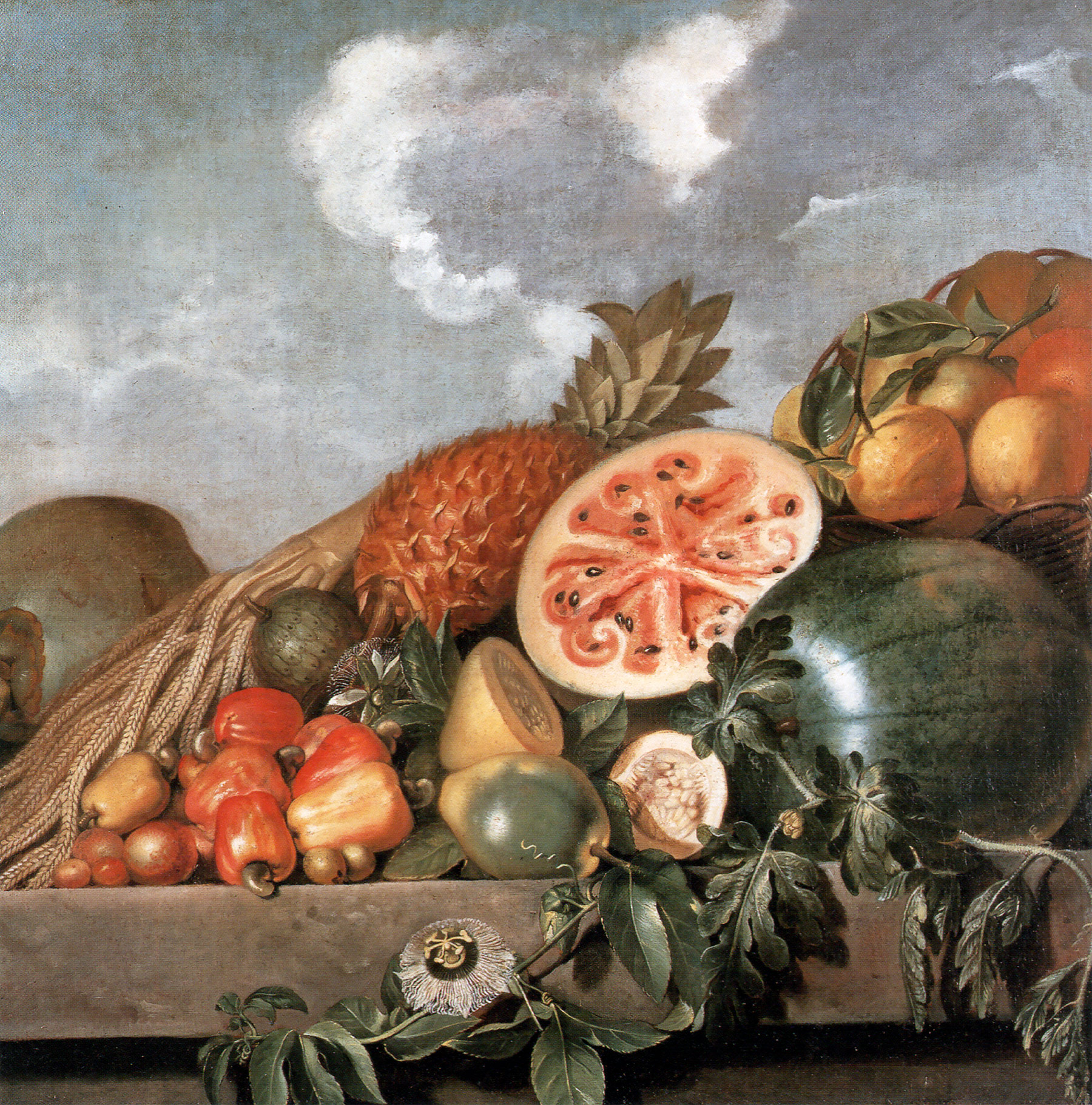
Pineapple, watermelons and other fruits (Brazilian fruits), a 17th century painting by Albert Eckhout, which includes cashew apples (in the lower left, with the nuts still attached) among the nation's fruits.

The mature cashew apple can be eaten fresh, cooked in curries, or fermented into vinegar, citric acid, or an alcoholic drink. It is also used to make preserves, chutneys, and jams in some countries, such as India and Brazil. In many countries, particularly in South America, the cashew apple is used to flavor drinks, both alcoholic and nonalcoholic.

In Brazil, cashew fruit juice and fruit pulp are used to make sweets, and juice mixed with alcoholic beverages such as cachaça, and as flour, milk, or cheese. In Panama, the cashew fruit is cooked with water and sugar for a prolonged time to make a sweet, brown, paste-like dessert called dulce de marañón (marañón being a Spanish name for cashew).

Cashew nuts are more widely traded than cashew apples, because the fruit, unlike the nut, is easily bruised and has a very limited shelf life. Cashew apple juice, however, may be used for manufacturing blended juices such as cajuína.

When the apple is consumed, its astringency is sometimes removed by steaming the fruit for five minutes before washing it in cold water. Steeping the fruit in boiling salt water for five minutes reduces the astringency.

In Cambodia, where the plant is usually grown as an ornamental rather than an economic tree, the fruit is a delicacy and is eaten with salt.

=== Alcohol ===
In the Indian state of Goa, the ripened cashew apples are mashed, and the juice, called "neero", is extracted and kept for fermentation for a few days. This fermented juice then undergoes a double distillation process. The resulting beverage is called feni or fenny. Feni is about 40–42% alcohol (80–84 proof). The single-distilled version is called urrak, which is about 15% alcohol (30 proof). In Tanzania, the cashew apple (bibo in Swahili) is dried and reconstituted with water and fermented, then distilled to make a strong liquor called gongo.

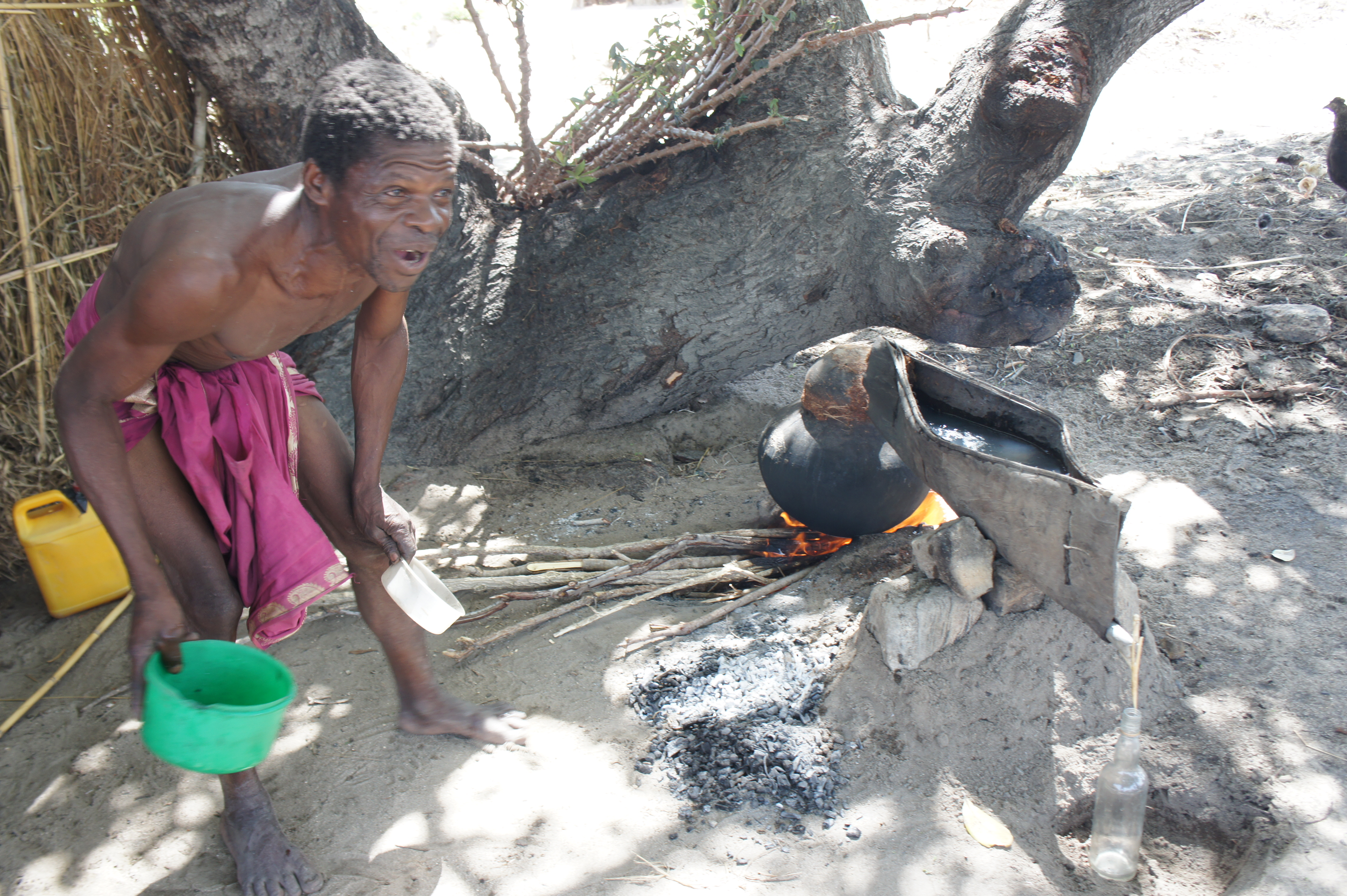
Distilling cashew apple liquor (muchekele) in Mozambique, southeastern Africa

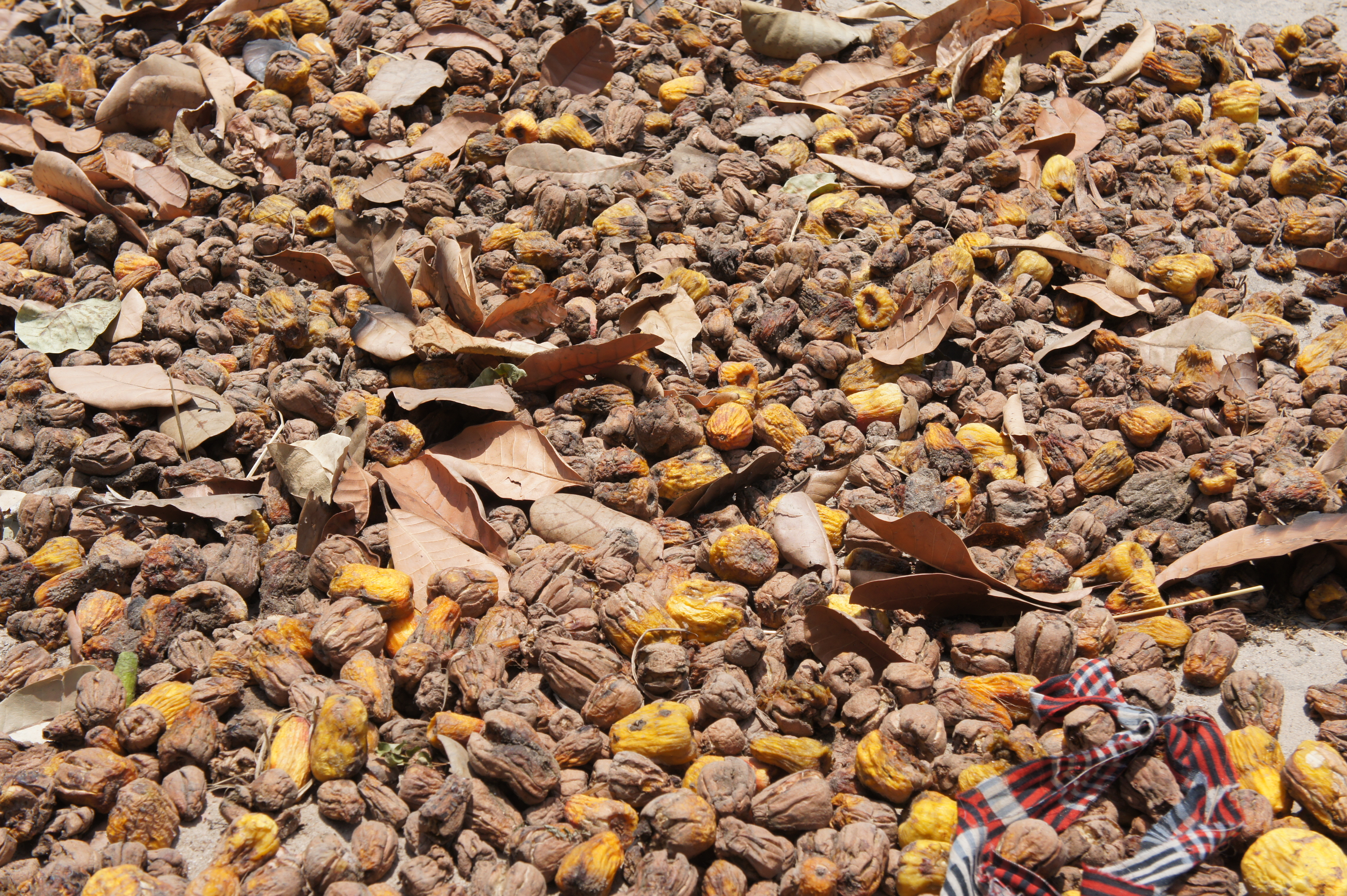
Cashew apples spread for drying and subsequent storage before reconstitution in water and later fermentation, Mozambique

=== Nut oil ===
Cashew nut oil is a dark yellow oil derived from pressing the cashew nuts (typically from lower-value broken chunks created accidentally during processing) and used for cooking or salad dressing. The highest quality oil is produced from a single cold pressing.

=== Shell oil ===
Cashew nutshell liquid (CNSL) or cashew shell oil (CAS registry number 8007-24-7) is a natural resin with a yellowish sheen found in the honeycomb structure of the cashew nutshell, and is a byproduct of processing cashew nuts. Since it is a strong irritant, it should not be confused with edible cashew nut oil. It is dangerous to handle in small-scale processing of the shells, but is itself a raw material with multiple uses. It is used in tropical folk medicine and for anti-termite treatment of timber. Its composition varies depending on how it is processed.

- Cold, solvent-extracted CNSL is mostly composed of anacardic acids (70%), cardol (18%), and cardanol (5%).
- Heating CNSL decarboxylates the anacardic acids, producing a technical grade of CNSL that is rich in cardanol. Distillation of this material gives distilled, technical CNSL containing 78% cardanol and 8% cardol (cardol has one more hydroxyl group than cardanol). This process also reduces the degree of thermal polymerization of the unsaturated alkyl-phenols present in CNSL.
- Anacardic acid is also used in the chemical industry for the production of cardanol, which is used for resins, coatings, and frictional materials.

These substances are skin allergens, like lacquer and the oils of poison ivy, and they present a danger during manual cashew processing.

This natural oil phenol has interesting chemical structural features that can be modified to create a wide spectrum of biobased monomers. These capitalize on the chemically-versatile construct, which contains three functional groups: The aromatic ring, the hydroxyl group, and the double bonds in the flanking alkyl chain. These include polyols, which have recently seen increased demand for their biobased origin and key chemical attributes such as high reactivity, range of functionalities, reduction in blowing agents, and naturally occurring fire retardant properties in the field of rigid polyurethanes, aided by their inherent phenolic structure and larger number of reactive units per unit mass.

CNSL may be used as a resin for carbon composite products. CNSL-based novolac is another versatile industrial monomer deriving from cardanol typically used as a reticulating agent (hardener) for epoxy matrices in composite applications providing good thermal and mechanical properties to the final composite material.

=== Animal feed ===
Discarded cashew nuts are unfit for human consumption and the residues of oil extraction from cashew kernels can be fed to livestock. Animals can also eat the leaves of cashew trees.

=== Other uses ===
In addition to its nut and fruit, the plant has several other uses. In Cambodia, the bark gives a yellow dye, the timber is used in boat-making, and for house-boards, and the wood makes excellent charcoal. The shells yield a black oil used as a preservative and waterproofing agent in varnishes, cement, and as a lubricant or timber seal. Derivatives of the shell are also used in paints.

Timber is used to manufacture furniture, boats, packing crates, and charcoal. Its juice turns black on exposure to air, providing an indelible ink.

== See also ==
- List of culinary nuts
- Semecarpus anacardium (the Oriental Anacardium), a native of India and closely related to the cashew
