= Mallar, Karnataka =

Mallar, Karnataka Mallar
- village
- Location in Karnataka, India
- Coordinates: 13.22°N 74.76°E
- Country: India
- State: Karnataka
- District: Udupi

Population (2001)
  - Total: 6,052

Languages
  - Official: Kannada
- Time zone: UTC+5:30 (IST)
- Postal code: 574106

Mallar is a census town in Udupi district in the Indian state of Karnataka.

== Demographics ==
As of 2001, India census, Mallar had a population of 6052. Males constitute 47% of the population and females 53%. Mallar has an average literacy rate of 75%, higher than the national average of 59.5%: male literacy is 80%, and female literacy is 71%. In Mallar, 10% of the population is under 6 years of age.
