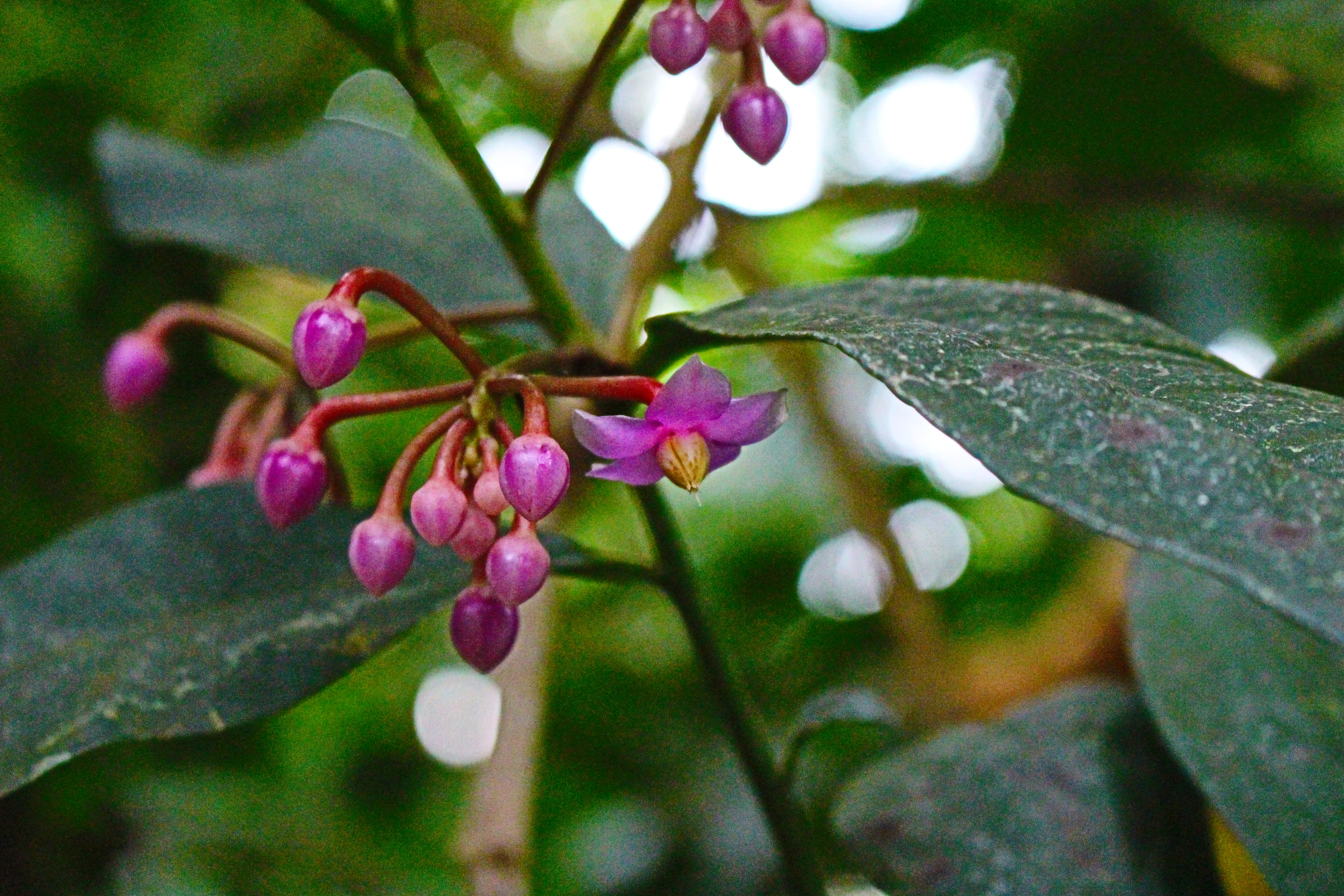
- Ardisia humilis grown as a potted plant

Scientific classification
- Kingdom: Plantae
- Clade: Embryophytes
- Clade: Tracheophytes
- Clade: Angiosperms
- Clade: Eudicots
- Clade: Asterids
- Order: Ericales
- Family: Primulaceae
- Genus: Ardisia
- Species: A. humilis

Binomial name
- Ardisia humilis Vahl

Synonyms
- Ardisia elliptica Roxb.

= Ardisia humilis =

Species of flowering plant

Ardisia humilis (jet berry) is a species of flowering plant in the genus Ardisia in the family Primulaceae, native to southeastern Asia in southern China (Guangdong, Hainan), the Philippines, and Vietnam.

== Description ==
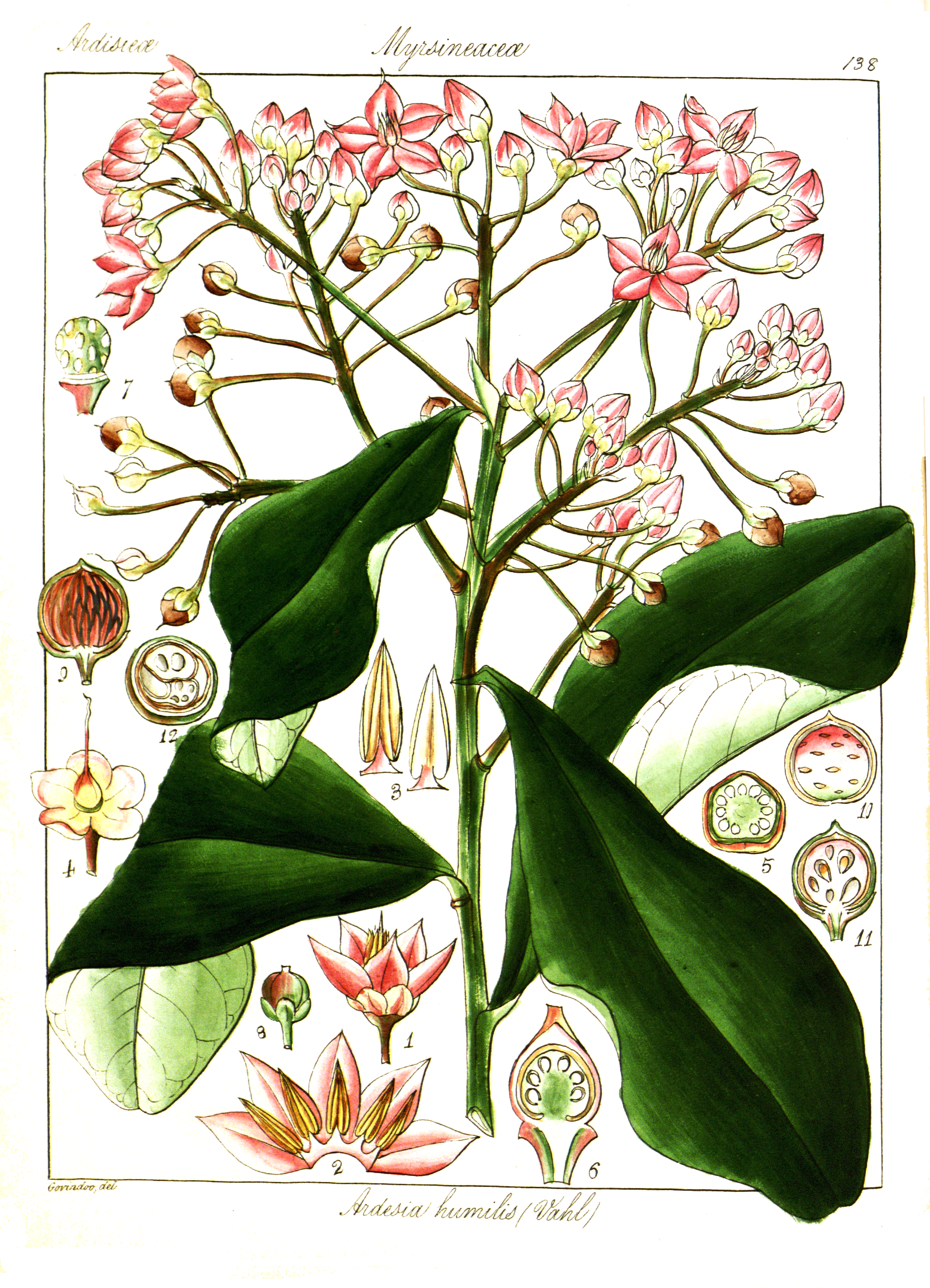
Botanical illustration of Ardisia humilis

Ardisia humilis is an evergreen shrub growing 1–2 m (rarely to 5 m) tall. The leaves are broad ovate to elliptical, 15–18 cm long and 5–7 cm broad, with a leathery texture and an acute apex. The flowers are reddish-purple to pink and 5–6 mm diameter; they are produced in corymbs in mid-spring. The fruit is a red to dark purple drupe 6 mm diameter, containing a single seed, and it matures in late autumn.

== Status ==
Ardisia humilis is considered to be included in the single variable species Ardisia elliptica by some botanists.
