= Anacardic acids =

General structure of anacardic acids. R is an alkyl chain of variable length, which may be saturated or unsaturated.

Anacardic acids are phenolic lipids, chemical compounds found in the shell of the cashew nut (Anacardium occidentale). An acid form of urushiol, they also cause an allergic skin rash on contact, known as urushiol-induced contact dermatitis. Anacardic acid is a yellow liquid. It is partially miscible with ethanol and ether, but nearly immiscible with water. Chemically, anacardic acid is a mixture of several closely related organic compounds. Each consists of a salicylic acid substituted with an alkyl chain that has 15 or 17 carbon atoms. The alkyl group may be saturated or unsaturated; anacardic acid is a mixture of saturated and unsaturated molecules. The exact mixture depends on the species of the plant. The 15-carbon unsaturated side chain compound found in the cashew plant is lethal to Gram-positive bacteria.

Folk use for tooth abscesses, it is also active against acne, some insects, tuberculosis, and MRSA. It is primarily found in foods such as cashew nuts, cashew apples, and cashew nutshell oil, but also in mangos and Pelargonium geraniums.

== Experimental antibacterial properties ==
Anacardic acid (C15:3, all-Z, major component)

Names
- Preferred IUPAC name 2-Hydroxy-6-[(8Z,11Z)-pentadeca-8,11,14-trienyl]benzoic acid

Identifiers
CAS Number	11034-77-8
3D model (JSmol)	Interactive image
ChEBI	CHEBI:183726
ChEMBL	ChEMBL455368
ChemSpider	134187
MeSH	anacardic+acid
PubChem CID	9875131
UNII	F5X3PZ4LDA
- InChI: InChI=1S/C22H30O3/c1-2-3-4-5-6-7-8-9-10-11-12-13-14-16-19-17-15-18-20(23)21(19)22(24)25/h2,4-5,7-8,15,17-18,23H,1,3,6,9-14,16H2,(H,24,25)/b5-4-,8-7- Key: QUVGEKPNSCFQIR-UTOQUPLUSA-N
- SMILES: C=CCC=CCC=CCCCCCCCC1=C(C(=CC=C1)O)C(=O)O

Properties
Chemical formula	C_{22}H_{30}O_{3}
Molar mass	342.4718 g/mol
- Except where otherwise noted, data are given for materials in their standard state (at 25 °C [77 °F], 100 kPa). verify (what is ?) Infobox references

The side chain with three unsaturated bonds was the most active against Streptococcus mutans, the tooth decay bacterium, in test tube experiments. The number of unsaturated bonds was not material against Cutibacterium acnes, the acne bacterium. Eichbaum claims that a solution of one part anacardic acid to 200,000 parts water to as low as one part in 2,000,000 is lethal to Gram-positive bacteria in 15 minutes in vitro. Somewhat higher ratios killed tubercle bacteria of tuberculosis in 30 minutes. Heating these anacardic acids converts them to the alcohols (cardanols) with reduced activity compared to the acids. Decarboxylation, such as through heating done in most commercial oil processing, results in compounds with significantly reduced activity. It is said that the people of the Gold Coast (now Ghana) use cashew leaves and bark for a toothache.

== Industrial uses ==
Anacardic acid is the main component of cashew nutshell liquid (CNSL), and finds use in the chemical industry for the production of cardanol, which is used for resins, coatings, and frictional materials. Cardanol is used to make phenalkamines, which are used as curing agents for the durable epoxy coatings used on concrete floors.

== History ==
The first chemical analysis of the oil of the cashew nut shell from the Anacardium occidentale was published in 1847. It was later found to be a mixture rather than one chemical, sometimes the plural anacardic acids is used.

== Synergies ==
Anacardic acid is synergistic with anethole from the seed of anise (Umbelliferae) and linalool from green tea in vitro [Muroi & Kubo, p1782]. The totarol in the bark of Podocarpus trees is synergistic with anacardic acid in its bactericidal effects.

== Other and potential uses ==
There is also a suspicion that inhibiting anacardic acids may arrest the growth of cancer tumors such as breast cancer. [Kubo et al., 1993] Inhibition of lysine acetyltransferase by anacardic acid was shown to make cancer cells using alternative lengthening of telomeres more sensitive to radiation.

Anacardic acid (2-hydroxy-6-alkylbenzoic acid) provides resistance to small pest insects (aphids and spider mites).

Anacardic acid kills methicillin-resistant Staphylococcus aureus (MRSA) cells more rapidly than totarol.

== List of anacardic acids ==
- 6-pentadecyl salicylic acid (6-PDSA), a potent HAT inhibitor from cashew nut shell liquid, and sensitizer of cancer cells to ionizing radiation.

== See also ==
- List of phytochemicals and foods in which they are prominent
