= Phenolic lipid =

Class of organic compounds

Bilobol, an alkylresorcinol found in Ginkgo biloba

Phenolic lipids are a class of natural products composed of long aliphatic chains and phenolic rings. Phenolic lipids occur in plants, fungi and bacteria.

== Types ==
- Alkylcatechols
- Alkylphenols (nonylphenol, cardanol)
- Alkylresorcinols
- Anacardic acids

== Biological activity ==
Due to their strong amphiphilic character, the phenolic lipids can incorporate into erythrocytes and liposomal membranes. The ability of these compounds to inhibit bacterial, fungal, protozoan and parasite growth seems to depend on their interaction with proteins and/or on their membrane-disturbing properties.

== Biological role ==
The phenolic lipid synthesis by type III polyketide synthases is essential for cyst formation in Azotobacter vinelandii.

== See also ==
- Lipid
