= Cardanol =

Phenolic lipid

- Example chemical structure of a cardanol

Identifiers
- CAS Number: 37330-39-5
- ChemSpider: none
- UNII: 4TB1UYZ2LN
- ChEMBL: ChEMBL470680
- CompTox Dashboard (EPA): DTXSID50872870
- ECHA InfoCard: 100.113.432

Chemical and physical data
- Formula: R = C_{15}H_{31–n}; n = 0,2,4,6

General formula for cardanols

Cardanol is a phenolic lipid obtained from anacardic acid, the main component of cashew nutshell liquid (CNSL), a byproduct of cashew nut processing. Cardanol finds use in the chemical industry in resins, coatings, frictional materials, and surfactants used as pigment dispersants for water-based inks. It is used to make phenalkamines, which are used as curing agents for the durable epoxy coatings used on concrete floors. The name of the substance is derived by contraction from the genus Anacardium, which includes the cashew tree, Anacardium occidentale. The name of the genus itself is based on the Greek word for heart.

Friction particles are made by polymerizing the unsaturated side chain of cardanol, followed by cross-polymerization with formaldehyde to yield a cardanol-formaldehyde resin by a process analogous to the formation of phenol-formaldehyde resins such as Bakelite. Cardanol-phenol resins were developed in the 1920s by Mortimer T. Harvey, then a student at Columbia University. These resins found use in vehicle brakes after it was found that they had a coefficient of friction that was less sensitive to temperature changes than phenol-formaldehyde resins.

Despite all these uses, only a fraction of the cardanol obtained from cashew nut processing is used in the industrial field. Therefore, there is still interest in developing new applications, such as new polymers.

The name cardanol is used for the decarboxylated derivatives obtained by thermal decomposition of any of the naturally occurring anacardic acids. This includes more than one compound because the composition of the side chain varies in its degree of unsaturation. Tri-unsaturated cardanol is the major component, at 41%. The remaining cardanol is 34% mono-unsaturated, 22% bi-unsaturated, and 2% saturated.

In terms of physical properties, cardanol is comparable to nonylphenol. Cardanol is hydrophobic and remains flexible and liquid at very low temperatures; its freezing point is below −20 °C, it has a density of 0.930 g/mL, and boils at 225 °C under reduced pressure (10 mmHg). CAS registry number: 37330-39-5.

Recently, it has been demonstrated that cardanol can be used for formation of eco-design of biobased polymeric microcapsules for pesticidal applications with potential to be further extended for drugs, self-healing agents, catalysts, etc.
