= List of Ardisia species =

Ardisia is a large, broadly distributed genus of flowering shrubs, trees and woody herbs in the primrose family, Primulaceae.

== Species ==
As of May 2025, Plants of the World Online accepts the following 739 species:

== A ==
- Ardisia aciphylla Pit.
- Ardisia acutiloba Mez
- Ardisia affinis Hemsl.
- Ardisia agasthyamalayana Nazarudeen, G.Rajkumar & Alister
- Ardisia aguirreana Pipoly
- Ardisia alabastroalata Taton
- Ardisia alajuelae (Lundell) Pipoly & Ricketson
- Ardisia alata H.R.Fletcher
- Ardisia albisepala (Lundell) Pipoly & Ricketson
- Ardisia albomaculata Pit.
- Ardisia albovirens Mez
- Ardisia alutacea C.Y.Wu & C.Chen
- Ardisia alverezii Merr.
- Ardisia alyxiifolia Tsiang ex C.Chen
- Ardisia amabilis Stapf
- Ardisia amboinensis Scheff.
- Ardisia amherstiana A.DC.
- Ardisia amplexicaulis Bedd.
- Ardisia anaclasta B.C.Stone
- Ardisia anamalaiana V.Ravich., Murug. & P.S.S.Rich.
- Ardisia anchicayana Ricketson & Pipoly
- Ardisia andamanica Kurz
- Ardisia angucianensis Ricketson & Pipoly
- Ardisia angustata Urb.
- Ardisia angustissima Kaneh. & Hatus.
- Ardisia annamensis Pit.
- Ardisia apoda Standl. & Steyerm.
- Ardisia applanata C.M.Hu & J.E.Vidal
- Ardisia aprica H.R.Fletcher
- Ardisia apsidata B.C.Stone
- Ardisia arborea Koord. & Valeton
- Ardisia arcuata Kaneh. & Hatus.
- Ardisia argentea Pit.
- Ardisia argentiana Julius & Utteridge
- Ardisia artemata B.C.Stone
- Ardisia asymmetrica C.M.Hu & J.E.Vidal
- Ardisia atrobullata Taton
- Ardisia atropurpurea Lundell
- Ardisia atrovirens K.Larsen & C.M.Hu
- Ardisia attenuata Wall. ex A.DC.
- Ardisia auriculata Donn.Sm.
- Ardisia austin-smithii Lundell
- Ardisia awarum Ricketson & Pipoly

== B ==
- Ardisia bakeri C.T.White
- Ardisia bamendae Cheek
- Ardisia bampsiana Taton
- Ardisia banaensis C.M.Hu & L.K.Phan
- Ardisia banghamii Merr.
- Ardisia baotingensis C.M.Hu
- Ardisia baracoensis (Britton & P.Wilson) Alain
- Ardisia barnesii Ridl.
- Ardisia bartletii Lundell
- Ardisia basilanensis Merr.
- Ardisia bastonalensis Ricketson & Pipoly
- Ardisia batangaensis Taton
- Ardisia baviensis C.M.Hu & J.E.Vidal
- Ardisia beccariana Mez
- Ardisia belaitensis C.M.Hu
- Ardisia belingaensis Taton
- Ardisia benomensis M.R.Hend.
- Ardisia betongensis H.R.Fletcher
- Ardisia bifaria C.T.White & W.D.Francis
- Ardisia biflora King & Gamble
- Ardisia biniflora Ridl.
- Ardisia bisumbellata Mez
- Ardisia blatteri Gamble
- Ardisia blepharodes Lundell
- Ardisia borneensis Scheff.
- Ardisia botryosa E.Walker
- Ardisia brachybotrys K.Schum. & Lauterb.
- Ardisia brachypoda Urb.
- Ardisia brachythyrsa Stapf
- Ardisia brackenridgei (A.Gray) Mez
- Ardisia bracteata Baker
- Ardisia bracteosa A.DC.
- Ardisia bractescens Ridl.
- Ardisia brandisiana Kurz
- Ardisia brassiella B.C.Stone
- Ardisia brassii Sleumer
- Ardisia breedlovei Lundell
- Ardisia brenesii Standl.
- Ardisia brevicaulis Diels
- Ardisia brevipedata F.Muell.
- Ardisia brevipetiolata (Merr.) Merr.
- Ardisia breviramea Merr.
- Ardisia brevis Lundell
- Ardisia brittonii Stearn
- Ardisia brunnescens E.Walker
- Ardisia buesgenii (Gilg & G.Schellenb.) Taton
- Ardisia bullata G.H.Huang & G.Hao
- Ardisia byrsonimae Stearn

== C ==
- Ardisia cabrerae Pipoly
- Ardisia cadieri Guillaumin
- Ardisia calavitensis Merr.
- Ardisia caloneura C.M.Hu & J.E.Vidal
- Ardisia calophylla Furtado
- Ardisia calophylloides Pit.
- Ardisia capillipes Pit.
- Ardisia capitellata Lundell
- Ardisia capuronii Pipoly
- Ardisia cardenasii Pipoly
- Ardisia cardiophylla B.C.Stone
- Ardisia carnea Mez
- Ardisia carnosicaulis C.Chen & D.Fang
- Ardisia cartagoana Lundell
- Ardisia castaneifolia Mez
- Ardisia caudata Hemsl.
- Ardisia caudifera Mez
- Ardisia caudiferoides B.C.Stone
- Ardisia celebica Scheff.
- Ardisia centenoi S.Vidal
- Ardisia chevalieri Pit.
- Ardisia chiapensis Brandegee
- Ardisia chimingiana Y.H.Tan & D.L.Quan
- Ardisia chocoana Lundell
- Ardisia chrysophyllifolia King & Gamble
- Ardisia cincta Mez
- Ardisia clarkeana (Kuntze) R.Kr.Singh
- Ardisia clemensii C.M.Hu & J.E.Vidal
- Ardisia coarcta B.C.Stone
- Ardisia cockburniana C.M.Hu
- Ardisia coclensis Lundell
- Ardisia cogolloi Pipoly
- Ardisia colombiana Lundell
- Ardisia colonensis Lundell
- Ardisia coloradoana Lundell
- Ardisia colorata G.Lodd.
- Ardisia comosa (de Wit) Taton
- Ardisia complanata Wall.
- Ardisia compressa Kunth
- Ardisia conandroides Kaneh. & Hatus.
- Ardisia confertiflora Merr.
- Ardisia confusa K.Larsen & C.M.Hu
- Ardisia congesta Ridl.
- Ardisia congestiflora C.M.Hu
- Ardisia conglomerata Lundell
- Ardisia conoidea Lundell
- Ardisia conraui Gilg
- Ardisia conspersa E.Walker
- Ardisia contrerasii Lundell
- Ardisia copelandii Mez
- Ardisia copeyana Standl.
- Ardisia cornudentata Mez
- Ardisia corymbifera Mez
- Ardisia costaricensis Lundell
- Ardisia crassa C.B.Clarke
- Ardisia crasseovata B.C.Stone
- Ardisia crassipedicellata Lundell
- Ardisia crassipes Lundell
- Ardisia crassiramea Standl.
- Ardisia crassirhiza Z.X.Li & F.W.Xing ex C.M.Hu
- Ardisia crassiuscula C.M.Hu
- Ardisia creaghii Ridl.
- Ardisia crenata Sims
- Ardisia crispa (Thunb.) A.DC.
- Ardisia croatii Lundell
- Ardisia crotonifolia C.M.Hu & J.E.Vidal
- Ardisia cumingiana A.DC.
- Ardisia cuneata Lundell
- Ardisia curranii Merr.
- Ardisia curtiflora Elmer
- Ardisia curvistyla Y.P.Yang
- Ardisia curvula C.Y.Wu & C.Chen
- Ardisia cutteri Standl.
- Ardisia cymosa Blume

== D-E ==
- Ardisia daklakensis C.M.Hu & Nuraliev
- Ardisia daphinifolia C.M.Hu
- Ardisia darienensis Lundell
- Ardisia darlingii Merr.
- Ardisia dasyneura Mez
- Ardisia dasyrhizomatica C.Y.Wu & C.Chen
- Ardisia davidsei Lundell
- Ardisia dawnaea C.E.Parkinson
- Ardisia decurviflora Mez
- Ardisia dekinderi Govaerts
- Ardisia demissa Miq.
- Ardisia denhamioides S.Moore
- Ardisia denigrata C.M.Hu
- Ardisia densilepidotula Merr.
- Ardisia densipunctata C.M.Hu
- Ardisia dentata (A.DC.) Mez
- Ardisia denticulata Blume
- Ardisia devogelii B.C.Stone
- Ardisia devredii Taton
- Ardisia dewildei C.M.Hu
- Ardisia dewitiana Taton
- Ardisia dictyoneura Urb.
- Ardisia didymopora (H.Perrier) Capuron
- Ardisia diffusa Merr.
- Ardisia discolor H.Lév.
- Ardisia disticha A.DC.
- Ardisia divergens Roxb.
- Ardisia diversifolia Koord. & Valeton
- Ardisia diversilimba Merr.
- Ardisia dodgei Standl.
- Ardisia doeringiana Malm
- Ardisia dolichocalyx Taton
- Ardisia dom Cheek
- Ardisia dukei Lundell
- Ardisia dumicola C.M.Hu & J.E.Vidal
- Ardisia dunlapiana P.H.Allen
- Ardisia dwyeri Lundell
- Ardisia ebo Cheek
- Ardisia ebolowensis Taton
- Ardisia eglandulosa H.R.Fletcher
- Ardisia elliptica Thunb.
- Ardisia elmeri Mez
- Ardisia elocellata C.M.Hu
- Ardisia ensifolia E.Walker
- Ardisia escallonioides Schltdl. & Cham.
- Ardisia esculenta Pav. ex A.DC.
- Ardisia etindensis Taton
- Ardisia eucuneata (Lundell) Pipoly & Ricketson
- Ardisia evrardii Pit.
- Ardisia eximia Miq.

== F ==
- Ardisia faberi Hemsl.
- Ardisia fasciculata C.T.White
- Ardisia fasciculiflora C.M.Hu & J.E.Vidal
- Ardisia fendleri Lundell
- Ardisia ferox Furtado
- Ardisia ferrugineopilosa H.R.Fletcher
- Ardisia ficifolia K.Larsen & C.M.Hu
- Ardisia filiformis E.Walker
- Ardisia filipendula C.M.Hu & J.E.Vidal
- Ardisia filipes C.T.White
- Ardisia fimbriata H.R.Fletcher
- Ardisia fimbrillifera Lundell
- Ardisia flavida Pipoly
- Ardisia flaviflora C.Chen & D.Fang
- Ardisia fletcheri K.Larsen & C.M.Hu
- Ardisia florida Pit.
- Ardisia foetida Willd. ex Roem. & Schult.
- Ardisia foliosa Furtado
- Ardisia folsomii Lundell
- Ardisia forbesii S.Moore
- Ardisia fordii Hemsl.
- Ardisia fortis Mez
- Ardisia fragrans Elmer
- Ardisia fruticosa Lundell
- Ardisia fuertesii Urb.
- Ardisia fuliginosa Blume
- Ardisia fulva King & Gamble
- Ardisia furfuracea Standl.
- Ardisia furfuracella Standl.
- Ardisia furva Ridl.

== G ==
- Ardisia gambleana Furtado
- Ardisia garcinifolia Pit.
- Ardisia gardneri C.B.Clarke
- Ardisia garubahaya C.M.Hu
- Ardisia gasingoides Julius & Utteridge
- Ardisia geissanthoides Mez
- Ardisia generalensis Ricketson & Pipoly
- Ardisia geniculata Lundell
- Ardisia gigantea Ricketson & Pipoly
- Ardisia gigantifolia Stapf
- Ardisia gjellerupii Mez
- Ardisia glanduligera Ridl.
- Ardisia glandulosomarginata Oerst.
- Ardisia glauca Mez
- Ardisia glauciflora Urb.
- Ardisia glomerata Lundell
- Ardisia glomeriflora J.F.Morales
- Ardisia goodenoughii Furtado
- Ardisia gordonii Ricketson & Pipoly
- Ardisia gorgonae Cuatrec.
- Ardisia gracilenta C.M.Hu & J.E.Vidal
- Ardisia graciliflora Pit.
- Ardisia gracillima K.Larsen & C.M.Hu
- Ardisia granatensis Mez
- Ardisia grandidens Mez
- Ardisia grandifolia A.DC.
- Ardisia griffithii C.B.Clarke
- Ardisia grisebachiana (Kuntze) Alain
- Ardisia guianensis (Aubl.) Mez
- Ardisia guttata Lundell

== H-I ==
- Ardisia hagenii Lundell
- Ardisia hallei Taton
- Ardisia hammelii Lundell
- Ardisia hanceana Mez
- Ardisia harmandii Pierre ex Pit.
- Ardisia helferiana Kurz
- Ardisia herrerana Pipoly & Ricketson
- Ardisia heterotricha (Lundell) Pipoly & Ricketson
- Ardisia hintonii Lundell
- Ardisia hokouensis Y.P.Yang
- Ardisia hosei Mez
- Ardisia hospitans K.Schum. & Lauterb.
- Ardisia huallagae Mez
- Ardisia hugonensis (Lundell) Pipoly & Ricketson
- Ardisia hullettii Mez
- Ardisia humilis Vahl
- Ardisia hyalina Lundell
- Ardisia hylandii Jackes
- Ardisia hymenandroides W.N.Takeuchi
- Ardisia hypargyrea C.Y.Wu & C.Chen
- Ardisia icara Wall. ex DC.
- Ardisia illicioides C.M.Hu & J.E.Vidal
- Ardisia ilocana Merr.
- Ardisia imbakensis Utteridge & Julius
- Ardisia imperialis K.Schum.
- Ardisia impressa H.R.Fletcher
- Ardisia inconspicua Mez
- Ardisia insignis Mez & Pittier
- Ardisia integra K.Larsen & C.M.Hu
- Ardisia interjacens C.M.Hu & J.E.Vidal
- Ardisia intibucana Lundell ex C.Nelson
- Ardisia involucrata Kurz
- Ardisia ionantha K.Larsen & C.M.Hu
- Ardisia iwahigensis Elmer
- Ardisia ixorifolia Pit.

== J-K ==
- Ardisia jamaicensis Lundell
- Ardisia japonica (Thunb.) Blume
- Ardisia javanica A.DC.
- Ardisia jefeana Lundell
- Ardisia junghuhniana Miq.
- Ardisia kachinensis Mez
- Ardisia kainantuensis Sleumer
- Ardisia kajumarina C.M.Hu
- Ardisia kalimbahin Magtoto
- Ardisia keenanii C.B.Clarke
- Ardisia keithleyi Merr.
- Ardisia kennedyae Ricketson & Pipoly
- Ardisia kerrii Craib
- Ardisia khasiana C.B.Clarke
- Ardisia killipii A.C.Sm.
- Ardisia kinabaluensis Merr.
- Ardisia knappiae (Lundell) Pipoly & Ricketson
- Ardisia korthalsiana Scheff.
- Ardisia kostermansii B.C.Stone
- Ardisia koupensis Taton
- Ardisia krauensis Julius, Syahida-Emiza & Utteridge
- Ardisia kunstleri King & Gamble
- Ardisia kurzii C.B.Clarke

== L ==
- Ardisia labisiifolia King & Gamble
- Ardisia laciniata Mez
- Ardisia laevigata Blume
- Ardisia lallaniana R.Kr.Singh
- Ardisia lamdongensis C.M.Hu & J.E.Vidal
- Ardisia lammersiana W.N.Takeuchi
- Ardisia lancifolia Merr.
- Ardisia lankaensis Kosterm.
- Ardisia lankawiensis King & Gamble
- Ardisia lauracea Mez
- Ardisia lauriformis Pit.
- Ardisia lauterbachii Sleumer
- Ardisia laxa Mez
- Ardisia laxiflora Merr.
- Ardisia lecomtei Pit.
- Ardisia ledermannii Mez
- Ardisia lepidotula Merr.
- Ardisia lepidula Mez
- Ardisia leptalea B.C.Stone
- Ardisia letestui Taton
- Ardisia lethomasiae Taton
- Ardisia letouzeyi Taton
- Ardisia leuserensis C.M.Hu
- Ardisia leytensis Merr.
- Ardisia liebmannii Oerst.
- Ardisia liesneri Lundell
- Ardisia lindleyana D.Dietr.
- Ardisia lingula B.C.Stone
- Ardisia lisowskii Taton & Lejoly
- Ardisia livida Mez
- Ardisia loheri Merr.
- Ardisia longipedicellata H.R.Fletcher
- Ardisia longipetiolata Merr.
- Ardisia loretensis Lundell
- Ardisia loureiroana (G.Don) Merr.
- Ardisia lucida Merr.
- Ardisia lucidula C.M.Hu & J.E.Vidal
- Ardisia lundelliana Pipoly
- Ardisia luquillensis (Britton) Alain
- Ardisia lurida Blume
- Ardisia lustrata B.C.Stone
- Ardisia luzonensis C.Presl

== M ==
- Ardisia macgregorii Merr.
- Ardisia maclurei Merr.
- Ardisia macrocalyx Scheff.
- Ardisia macrocarpa Wall.
- Ardisia macrophylla Reinw. ex Blume
- Ardisia macropus Mez
- Ardisia macrosepala Pit.
- Ardisia maehongsonia K.Larsen & C.M.Hu
- Ardisia maestrensis Urb.
- Ardisia magnifica Mez
- Ardisia malipoensis C.M.Hu
- Ardisia mameyensis Ricketson & Pipoly
- Ardisia mamillata Hance
- Ardisia manglillo Cuatrec.
- Ardisia manitzii Panfet
- Ardisia marcelianum Govaerts
- Ardisia marginata Blume
- Ardisia marojejyensis J.S.Mill. & Pipoly
- Ardisia mawaiensis Furtado ex B.C.Stone
- Ardisia maxima Pit.
- Ardisia maxonii Standl.
- Ardisia mayumbensis (R.D.Good) Taton
- Ardisia mcphersonii Pipoly
- Ardisia medogensis C.M.Hu & G.Hao
- Ardisia megalocarpa Ridl.
- Ardisia meghalayensis M.P.Nayar & G.S.Giri
- Ardisia megistophylla Lundell
- Ardisia megistosepala Merr.
- Ardisia meijeri C.M.Hu
- Ardisia melastomoides Pit.
- Ardisia membranifolia Mez
- Ardisia merrillii E.Walker
- Ardisia mexicana Lundell
- Ardisia meziana King & Gamble
- Ardisia mezii Elmer
- Ardisia micranthera Pit.
- Ardisia microcarpa (Pit.) Ricketson & Pipoly
- Ardisia microsoropsis B.C.Stone
- Ardisia mildbraedii (Gilg & G.Schellenb.) Taton
- Ardisia milleflora Mez
- Ardisia milneensis C.M.Hu
- Ardisia mindanaensis Mez
- Ardisia minor King & Gamble
- Ardisia minutiflora Lundell
- Ardisia miqueliana Scheff.
- Ardisia mirabilis Pit.
- Ardisia mirandae Merr.
- Ardisia mjoebergii Merr.
- Ardisia mogotensis Urb.
- Ardisia momiensis Kaneh. & Hatus.
- Ardisia monilipila B.C.Stone
- Ardisia monsalveae Pipoly
- Ardisia monticola Ridl.
- Ardisia morobeensis Sleumer
- Ardisia morotaiensis C.M.Hu
- Ardisia multipunctata H.R.Fletcher
- Ardisia muluensis B.C.Stone
- Ardisia murtonii H.R.Fletcher
- Ardisia myrcioides S.Moore
- Ardisia myriosticta K.Schum.
- Ardisia myrsinoides Pit.

== N ==
- Ardisia nabirensis Kaneh. & Hatus.
- Ardisia nagaensis Julius, Kajita & Utteridge
- Ardisia nagelii Mez
- Ardisia nana Pipoly & Ricketson
- Ardisia neglecta M.P.Nayar & G.S.Giri
- Ardisia negroensis Mez
- Ardisia neonobotrys K.Schum.
- Ardisia neriifolia Wall. ex A.DC.
- Ardisia nervosa H.R.Fletcher
- Ardisia nervosissima Lundell
- Ardisia nevermannii Standl.
- Ardisia nhatrangensis C.M.Hu & J.E.Vidal
- Ardisia niambiensis Pipoly & Cogollo
- Ardisia nigrescens Oerst.
- Ardisia nigrita Lundell
- Ardisia nigromaculata Merr.
- Ardisia nigropilosa Pit.
- Ardisia nigropunctata Oerst.
- Ardisia nigrovirens J.F.Macbr.
- Ardisia novitensis Lundell
- Ardisia nurii Furtado
- Ardisia nutantiflora S.Z.Mao & C.M.Hu

== O ==
- Ardisia obovata Desv.
- Ardisia obovatifolia Merr.
- Ardisia obscurinervia Merr.
- Ardisia obtusa Mez
- Ardisia odontophylla Wall. ex A.DC.
- Ardisia olivacea E.Walker
- Ardisia omalocarpa Ridl.
- Ardisia omissa C.M.Hu
- Ardisia oocarpa Stapf
- Ardisia opaca Lundell
- Ardisia opegrapha Oerst.
- Ardisia ophirensis (C.B.Clarke) Mez
- Ardisia ordinata E.Walker
- Ardisia oreophila C.M.Hu
- Ardisia ototomoensis Taton
- Ardisia oxyphylla Wall. ex A.DC.
- Ardisia oxystemon Ridl. ex H.R.Fletcher

== P ==
- Ardisia pachyrhachis (F.Muell.) F.Muell.
- Ardisia pachysandra (Wall.) Mez
- Ardisia palawanensis Merr.
- Ardisia pallidiflora Ridl.
- Ardisia palmana Donn.Sm.
- Ardisia palustris K.Larsen & C.M.Hu
- Ardisia panamensis Lundell
- Ardisia paniculata Roxb.
- Ardisia paradoxa C.M.Hu & J.E.Vidal
- Ardisia paralleloneura K.Larsen & C.M.Hu
- Ardisia paschalis Donn.Sm.
- Ardisia patentiradiosa C.M.Hu & Nuraliev
- Ardisia pauciflora B.Heyne ex Wall.
- Ardisia paupera Mez
- Ardisia pedalis E.Walker
- Ardisia pedunculata H.R.Fletcher
- Ardisia pedunculosa Wall.
- Ardisia pellucida Oerst.
- Ardisia pentaglossa B.C.Stone
- Ardisia pergamacea (Miq.) Mez
- Ardisia perinsignis Lundell
- Ardisia perissa B.C.Stone
- Ardisia perpendicularis E.Walker
- Ardisia perreticulata C.Chen
- Ardisia perrottetiana A.DC.
- Ardisia petelotii E.Walker
- Ardisia petila B.C.Stone
- Ardisia petocalyx Scheff.
- Ardisia phaeoneura C.M.Hu
- Ardisia phankelociana C.M.Hu & G.Hao
- Ardisia picardae Urb. ex Mez
- Ardisia pichinchana Lundell
- Ardisia pierreana Taton
- Ardisia pilosa H.R.Fletcher
- Ardisia pingbienensis Y.P.Yang
- Ardisia pirifolia Mez
- Ardisia pitardii C.M.Hu & J.E.Vidal
- Ardisia pleurobotrya Donn.Sm.
- Ardisia pluvialis Pipoly
- Ardisia poilanei Pit.
- Ardisia polyactis Mez
- Ardisia polyadenia Gilg
- Ardisia polycephala Wall. ex A.DC.
- Ardisia polylepis Mez
- Ardisia polysticta Miq.
- Ardisia poolei C.T.White & W.D.Francis ex Lane-Poole
- Ardisia popayanensis Mez
- Ardisia poranthera F.Muell. & C.Moore
- Ardisia porifera E.Walker
- Ardisia porosa C.B.Clarke
- Ardisia praetervisa C.M.Hu
- Ardisia premnifolia C.M.Hu
- Ardisia premontana Pipoly
- Ardisia primulifolia Gardner & Champ.
- Ardisia prionata E.Walker
- Ardisia procera Capuron
- Ardisia prolifera C.M.Hu & J.E.Vidal
- Ardisia prunifolia C.M.Hu & J.E.Vidal
- Ardisia pseudocrispa Pit.
- Ardisia pseudocuspidata Pipoly & Ricketson
- Ardisia pseudoracemiflora Pipoly
- Ardisia psychotriiphylla Pit.
- Ardisia pterocaulis Miq.
- Ardisia pteropoda Miq.
- Ardisia puberula H.R.Fletcher
- Ardisia pubicalyx Miq.
- Ardisia pubivenula E.Walker
- Ardisia pulchella Mez
- Ardisia pulverulenta Mez
- Ardisia pulvinulata B.C.Stone
- Ardisia punicea H.R.Fletcher
- Ardisia purpurea Reinw. ex Blume
- Ardisia purpureovillosa C.Y.Wu & C.Chen ex C.M.Hu
- Ardisia purseglovei Furtado
- Ardisia pusilla A.DC.
- Ardisia pustulata Mez
- Ardisia pygmaea Merr.
- Ardisia pyramidalis (Cav.) Pers.
- Ardisia pyrotechnica Julius, Tagane & Utteridge
- Ardisia pyrsocoma B.C.Stone

== Q-R ==
- Ardisia quangnamensis C.M.Hu & J.E.Vidal
- Ardisia quinquangularis A.DC.
- Ardisia quinquegona Blume
- Ardisia racemibunda B.C.Stone
- Ardisia racemigera Mez
- Ardisia racemosopaniculata Mez
- Ardisia ramaswamii Nazarudeen, G.Rajkumar & Prakashk.
- Ardisia ramondiiformis Pit.
- Ardisia rapaneifolia C.M.Hu & J.E.Vidal
- Ardisia rarescens Standl.
- Ardisia ravida C.M.Hu & J.E.Vidal
- Ardisia reclinata Scheff.
- Ardisia recliniflora Pit.
- Ardisia recurvata C.M.Hu
- Ardisia recurvipetala Julius, Siti-Munirah & Utteridge
- Ardisia recurvisepala Julius & Utteridge
- Ardisia replicata E.Walker
- Ardisia reptans Merr.
- Ardisia retinervia Ridl.
- Ardisia retroflexa E.Walker
- Ardisia retusa Lundell
- Ardisia revoluta Kunth
- Ardisia reynosoi B.C.Stone
- Ardisia rhodochroa C.M.Hu & J.E.Vidal
- Ardisia rhomboidea Wight
- Ardisia rhynchophylla C.B.Clarke
- Ardisia rhynchotechioides (Kraenzl.) Hand.-Mazz.
- Ardisia ridleyi King & Gamble
- Ardisia ridsdalei C.M.Hu
- Ardisia rigida Kurz
- Ardisia rigidifolia Lundell
- Ardisia rigidula Mez
- Ardisia rivularis Merr.
- Ardisia romanii Elmer
- Ardisia rosea King & Gamble
- Ardisia roseiflora Pit.
- Ardisia rothii A.DC.
- Ardisia rubescens Pit.
- Ardisia rubicunda C.M.Hu
- Ardisia rubiginosa Miq.
- Ardisia rubricaulis S.Z.Mao & C.M.Hu
- Ardisia rubroglandulosa H.R.Fletcher
- Ardisia rudis J.Sinclair
- Ardisia ruedae Ricketson & Pipoly
- Ardisia rumphii Merr.
- Ardisia russellii M.P.Nayar & G.S.Giri
- Ardisia ruthiae B.C.Stone

== S ==
- Ardisia sadebeckiana Gilg
- Ardisia sadirioides C.M.Hu & L.K.Phan
- Ardisia sagoensis C.M.Hu
- Ardisia saligna Mez
- Ardisia samarensis Merr.
- Ardisia sanmartensis (Rusby) Standl.
- Ardisia sapida Cuatrec.
- Ardisia sarawakensis Merr.
- Ardisia sauraujifolia Pit.
- Ardisia scabrida Mez
- Ardisia scalarinervis E.Walker
- Ardisia scalaris Mez
- Ardisia scheryi Lundell
- Ardisia schippii Standl.
- Ardisia schlechteri Gilg
- Ardisia schultzei Mez
- Ardisia scortechinii King & Gamble
- Ardisia serrata (Cav.) Pers.
- Ardisia sessilifolia Mez
- Ardisia sessilis Scheff.
- Ardisia sharoniae Manjato, Ravololoman. & Razakamal.
- Ardisia shweliensis W.W.Sm.
- Ardisia siamensis H.R.Fletcher
- Ardisia sibulanensis Elmer
- Ardisia sibuyanensis Elmer
- Ardisia sicula B.C.Stone
- Ardisia sideromalla K.Schum.
- Ardisia sieboldii Miq.
- Ardisia sigillata B.C.Stone
- Ardisia silamensis Utteridge, Julius & Suzana
- Ardisia silvestris Pit.
- Ardisia singularis B.C.Stone
- Ardisia sinuata King & Gamble
- Ardisia smaragdina Pit.
- Ardisia smaragdinoides Yahara & Tagane
- Ardisia smurfitiana Ricketson & Pipoly
- Ardisia solanacea Roxb.
- Ardisia solida B.C.Stone
- Ardisia sonchifolia Mez
- Ardisia sorogensis C.M.Hu
- Ardisia spanoghei Scheff.
- Ardisia sphenobasis Scheff.
- Ardisia spiciformis C.M.Hu
- Ardisia spilota B.C.Stone
- Ardisia splendens Pit.
- Ardisia squarrosa Mez
- Ardisia staminosa Lundell
- Ardisia standleyana P.H.Allen
- Ardisia staudtii Gilg
- Ardisia steinii Pipoly & Ricketson
- Ardisia stichantha B.C.Stone
- Ardisia stipitata H.R.Fletcher
- Ardisia stonei Sasidh. & Sivar.
- Ardisia storkii Lundell
- Ardisia subanceps K.Schum. & Lauterb.
- Ardisia subcrenulata Lundell
- Ardisia subcuneifolia Lundell
- Ardisia sublanceolata Hochr.
- Ardisia sublepidota Merr.
- Ardisia suboppositifolia C.M.Hu & J.E.Vidal
- Ardisia subpilosa H.R.Fletcher
- Ardisia subsessilifolia Lundell
- Ardisia subtilis S.Moore
- Ardisia subverticillata Julius & Utteridge
- Ardisia sulcata Mez
- Ardisia sumatrana Miq.
- Ardisia symplocifolia (C.Chen) K.Larsen & C.M.Hu

== T ==
- Ardisia tacanensis Lundell
- Ardisia tachibana Makino
- Ardisia tahanica King & Gamble
- Ardisia talamancensis Ricketson & Pipoly
- Ardisia tanycardia B.C.Stone
- Ardisia tarariae Lundell
- Ardisia tayabensis Merr.
- Ardisia taytayensis Merr.
- Ardisia tenuicaulis Lundell
- Ardisia tenuis Lundell
- Ardisia ternatensis Scheff.
- Ardisia tetramera K.Larsen & C.M.Hu
- Ardisia tetrasepala King & Gamble
- Ardisia teysmanniana Scheff.
- Ardisia theifolia King & Gamble
- Ardisia thomsonii Mez
- Ardisia thyrsiflora D.Don
- Ardisia tilaranensis Standl.
- Ardisia tinctoria Pit.
- Ardisia tinifolia Sw.
- Ardisia tomentosa C.Presl
- Ardisia torsiva C.M.Hu
- Ardisia tortuguerensis Ricketson & Pipoly
- Ardisia translucida H.R.Fletcher
- Ardisia trichogyne B.C.Stone
- Ardisia tristanioides S.Moore
- Ardisia tristis K.Larsen & C.M.Hu
- Ardisia tuberculata Wall. ex A.DC.
- Ardisia tuerckheimii Donn.Sm.
- Ardisia tumida Furtado
- Ardisia turbinata B.C.Stone
- Ardisia tysonii Lundell

== U-Z ==
- Ardisia unguiensis Lundell
- Ardisia uniflora K.Larsen & C.M.Hu
- Ardisia urbanii Stearn
- Ardisia uregaensis Taton
- Ardisia ursina Lundell
- Ardisia vatteri Standl. & Steyerm.
- Ardisia vaughanii Ridl.
- Ardisia velutina Pit.
- Ardisia venosa Mast. ex Donn.Sm.
- Ardisia venosissima (Ruiz & Pav.) J.F.Macbr.
- Ardisia venulosa C.M.Hu
- Ardisia venusta S.Moore
- Ardisia verapazensis Donn.Sm.
- Ardisia verbascifolia Mez
- Ardisia verdisepala Ricketson & Pipoly
- Ardisia vernicosa Mez
- Ardisia verrucosa C.Presl
- Ardisia vesca Lundell
- Ardisia viburnifolia Pit.
- Ardisia vidalii C.M.Hu
- Ardisia vietnamensis C.M.Hu & J.E.Vidal
- Ardisia villosa Roxb.
- Ardisia viminea Ridl.
- Ardisia violacea (T.Suzuki) W.Z.Fang & K.Yao
- Ardisia vohimenensis Manjato, Ravololoman. & Razakamal.
- Ardisia waitakii C.M.Hu
- Ardisia × walkeri Y.P.Yang
- Ardisia wallichii A.DC.
- Ardisia warburgiana Mez
- Ardisia weberbaueri Mez
- Ardisia websteri Pipoly
- Ardisia wedelii Lundell
- Ardisia whitmorei Julius & Utteridge
- Ardisia wightiana (A.DC.) Wall. ex Mez
- Ardisia willisii Mez
- Ardisia yatesii Merr.
- Ardisia zambalensis Merr.
- Ardisia zenkeri Gilg
- Ardisia zeylanica (Gaertn.) Lam. ex Forsyth f.
