= Ardisia rufa =

Conservation status
- Endangered (IUCN 2.3)

Scientific classification
- Kingdom: Plantae
- Clade: Tracheophytes
- Clade: Angiosperms
- Clade: Eudicots
- Clade: Asterids
- Order: Ericales
- Family: Primulaceae
- Genus: Ardisia
- Species: A. rufa

Binomial name
- Ardisia rufa Lundell

Species of flowering plant

Ardisia rufa is a species of plant in the family Primulaceae. It is endemic to Panama. It is threatened by habitat loss.
