= Ardisia alstonii =

Conservation status
- Vulnerable (IUCN 2.3)

Scientific classification
- Kingdom: Plantae
- Clade: Tracheophytes
- Clade: Angiosperms
- Clade: Eudicots
- Clade: Asterids
- Order: Ericales
- Family: Primulaceae
- Genus: Ardisia
- Species: A. alstonii

Binomial name
- Ardisia alstonii Lundell

Synonyms
- Icacorea alstonii (Lundell) Lundell

Species of flowering plant

Ardisia alstonii is a species of flowering plant in the family Primulaceae described from Panama. It was named in 1971 by the American botanist Cyrus Longworth Lundell, whose research on the Myrsinaceae of Central America produced a large number of new species names for the region. The IUCN continues to recognise the taxon and assesses it as vulnerable, treating it as endemic to Panama and threatened by habitat loss. The World Checklist of Vascular Plants, maintained by the Royal Botanic Gardens, Kew, by contrast regards A. alstonii as a synonym of the widespread Neotropical species Ardisia compressa Kunth.

== Taxonomy ==
Lundell, founder of the botanical journal Wrightia, published the name Ardisia alstonii in volume 4 of that journal in 1971. The species was treated the same year in his account of the family for the long-running Flora of Panama project, which appeared as Part VIII, Family 150 (Myrsinaceae) in the Annals of the Missouri Botanical Garden. In 1981, as part of a broader scheme that split the large genus Ardisia into a series of segregate genera, Lundell transferred the species to Icacorea as Icacorea alstonii (Lundell) Lundell in the journal Phytologia. This narrower generic concept has not been widely followed by later workers, and the species is normally cited under Ardisia.

The genus Ardisia comprises roughly 500 species of evergreen shrubs and small trees distributed across the tropics and subtropics, with high diversity in the Neotropics and around fifty species reported from Panama alone. The genus was historically placed in Myrsinaceae, a family now included in an expanded Primulaceae following APG molecular classifications.

Subsequent revisionary work, beginning with J. J. Pipoly III and J. M. Ricketson's monographs of Mesoamerican Ardisia in the late 1990s, has folded many of Lundell's narrowly circumscribed Central American species into broader, more variable taxa. Under the current World Checklist treatment, A. alstonii is one of more than forty heterotypic synonyms of Ardisia compressa Kunth (1819).

== Distribution and habitat ==
The type material of Ardisia alstonii was collected in Panama, and the species has been treated as endemic to that country in conservation assessments. Under the broader circumscription of A. compressa, the taxon occurs as a shrub or small tree of the wet tropical biome across much of Mesoamerica and northern South America, with a native range extending from Mexico through Belize, Guatemala, Honduras, El Salvador, Nicaragua, Costa Rica and Panama to Trinidad, Venezuela, Colombia and Ecuador. The fruit of A. compressa is locally used as food.

== Conservation ==
The IUCN Red List assessment of Ardisia alstonii was prepared by Mireya Mitré and published in 2020, succeeding an earlier 1998 evaluation. The species is listed as vulnerable under criteria of the 1994 IUCN system, with habitat loss identified as the principal threat. Where the species is treated as part of A. compressa, that broader species is classified by the IUCN as least concern, and an automated extinction-risk prediction published in 2024 likewise scored it as not threatened.
