= A. crispa =

A. crispa may refer to:

- Aerides crispa, an orchid
- Alder crispa, a tree in the birch family
- Alnus crispa, an alder with a wide range across the cooler parts of the Northern Hemisphere
- Amphiura crispa, a brittle star
- Anchusa crispa, a critically endangered species
- Ardisia crispa, a coralberry
- Astilbe crispa, a perennial, herbaceous flowering plant

== See also ==
- Crispa (disambiguation)
