= Ardisia rigidifolia =

Conservation status
- Least Concern (IUCN 3.1)

Scientific classification
- Kingdom: Plantae
- Clade: Tracheophytes
- Clade: Angiosperms
- Clade: Eudicots
- Clade: Asterids
- Order: Ericales
- Family: Primulaceae
- Genus: Ardisia
- Species: A. rigidifolia

Binomial name
- Ardisia rigidifolia Lundell

Synonyms
- Ardisia eugenioides Lundell; Ardisia foveolata Lundell; Ardisia hornitoana Pipoly & Ricketson; Icacorea rigidifolia (Lundell) Lundell; Icacorea eugenioides (Lundell) Lundell; Icacorea foveolata (Lundell) Lundell; Icacorea reflexa Lundell

Species of flowering plant

Ardisia rigidifolia is a species of plant in the family Primulaceae. It is a shrub or small tree, up to 8 meters tall, which is endemic to Panama. It is native to the Caribbean slope of western Panama and the Darién region in far eastern Panama. It in the west it grows in both lowland and montane forest, and in montane forest in eastern Panama, from 708 to 2025 meters elevation. This species is widespread with many records, including in Darién National Park and Fortuna Forest Reserve. The IUCN Red List assesses the species as Least Concern.
