= Ardisia fendleri =

Conservation status
- Least Concern (IUCN 3.1)

Scientific classification
- Kingdom: Plantae
- Clade: Embryophytes
- Clade: Tracheophytes
- Clade: Spermatophytes
- Clade: Angiosperms
- Clade: Eudicots
- Clade: Asterids
- Order: Ericales
- Family: Primulaceae
- Genus: Ardisia
- Species: A. fendleri

Binomial name
- Ardisia fendleri Lundell

Synonyms
- Synonymy: Ardisia acutata Lundell; Ardisia antonensis Lundell; Ardisia campanensis Lundell; Ardisia guinealensis (Lundell) Pipoly & Ricketson; Ardisia oaxacana (Lundell) Pipoly & Ricketson; Ardisia proctorii Lundell; Ardisia raveniana Lundell; Ardisia santafeana Lundell; Auriculardisia acutata (Lundell) Lundell; Icacorea antonensis (Lundell) Lundell; Icacorea campanensis (Lundell) Lundell; Icacorea fendleri (Lundell) Lundell; Icacorea guinealensis Lundell; Icacorea oaxacana Lundell; Icacorea proctorii (Lundell) Lundell; Icacorea raveniana (Lundell) Lundell; Icacorea santafeana (Lundell) Lundell

Species of flowering plant

Ardisia fendleri is a species of flowering plant in the family Primulaceae. It is a shrub or small tree native to southern Mexico and to Nicaragua, Costa Rica, and Panama in Central America. It grows from 3 to 7 meters tall in tropical moist lowland and montane forests from sea level to 2000 meters elevation.
