= Ardisia opaca =

Conservation status
- Near Threatened (IUCN 2.3)

Scientific classification
- Kingdom: Plantae
- Clade: Tracheophytes
- Clade: Angiosperms
- Clade: Eudicots
- Clade: Asterids
- Order: Ericales
- Family: Primulaceae
- Genus: Ardisia
- Species: A. opaca

Binomial name
- Ardisia opaca Lundell

Synonyms
- Icacorea opaca (Lundell) Lundell

Species of flowering plant

Ardisia opaca is a species of flowering plant in the family Primulaceae. It is endemic to Panama. It is threatened by habitat loss.
