= Ardisia maxonii =

Conservation status
- Near Threatened (IUCN 2.3)

Scientific classification
- Kingdom: Plantae
- Clade: Tracheophytes
- Clade: Angiosperms
- Clade: Eudicots
- Clade: Asterids
- Order: Ericales
- Family: Primulaceae
- Genus: Ardisia
- Species: A. maxonii

Binomial name
- Ardisia maxonii (Standl.) Lundell

Species of flowering plant

Ardisia maxonii is a species of plant in the family Primulaceae. It is found in Costa Rica and Panama.

It is named for the botanist William Ralph Maxon.
