= Ardisia dukei =

Conservation status
- Data Deficient (IUCN 3.1)

Scientific classification
- Kingdom: Plantae
- Clade: Tracheophytes
- Clade: Angiosperms
- Clade: Eudicots
- Clade: Asterids
- Order: Ericales
- Family: Primulaceae
- Genus: Ardisia
- Species: A. dukei

Binomial name
- Ardisia dukei Lundell

Synonyms
- Auriculardisia dukei (Lundell) Lundell; Icacorea dukei (Lundell) Lundell

Species of flowering plant

Ardisia dukei is a species of flowering plant in the family Primulaceae. It is endemic to Panama.
