= Ardisia scheryi =

Conservation status
- Endangered (IUCN 2.3)

Scientific classification
- Kingdom: Plantae
- Clade: Tracheophytes
- Clade: Angiosperms
- Clade: Eudicots
- Clade: Asterids
- Order: Ericales
- Family: Primulaceae
- Genus: Ardisia
- Species: A. scheryi

Binomial name
- Ardisia scheryi Lundell

Synonyms
- Homotypic Synonyms: Icacorea scheryi (Lundell) Lundell; Heterotypic Synonyms: Ardisia pluriflora Lundell; Icacorea pluriflora (Lundell) Lundell

Species of flowering plant

Ardisia scheryi is a species of flowering plant in the family Primulaceae. It is a shrub endemic to Panama. It is threatened by habitat loss.
