= Ardisia jamaicensis =

Conservation status
- Vulnerable (IUCN 2.3)

Scientific classification
- Kingdom: Plantae
- Clade: Tracheophytes
- Clade: Angiosperms
- Clade: Eudicots
- Clade: Asterids
- Order: Ericales
- Family: Primulaceae
- Genus: Ardisia
- Species: A. jamaicensis

Binomial name
- Ardisia jamaicensis Lundell

Synonyms
- Icacorea jamaicensis (Lundell) Lundell

Species of flowering plant

Ardisia jamaicensis is a species of flowering plant in the family Primulaceae. It is endemic to Jamaica.
