= Ardisia hagenii =

Conservation status
- Data Deficient (IUCN 3.1)

Scientific classification
- Kingdom: Plantae
- Clade: Tracheophytes
- Clade: Angiosperms
- Clade: Eudicots
- Clade: Asterids
- Order: Ericales
- Family: Primulaceae
- Genus: Ardisia
- Species: A. hagenii

Binomial name
- Ardisia hagenii Lundell

Synonyms
- Homotypic Synonyms: Auriculardisia hagenii (Lundell) Lundell; Heterotypic Synonyms: Ardisia chiriquiana (Lundell) Pipoly & Ricketson; Ardisia toroana (Lundell) Pipoly & Ricketson; Auriculardisia chiriquiana Lundell; Auriculardisia toroana Lundell

Species of flowering plant

Ardisia hagenii is a species of flowering plant in the family Primulaceae. It is endemic to Panama.
