= Ardisia geniculata =

Conservation status
- Vulnerable (IUCN 3.1)

Scientific classification
- Kingdom: Plantae
- Clade: Tracheophytes
- Clade: Angiosperms
- Clade: Eudicots
- Clade: Asterids
- Order: Ericales
- Family: Primulaceae
- Genus: Ardisia
- Species: A. geniculata

Binomial name
- Ardisia geniculata Lundell

Synonyms
- Homotypic Synonyms: Icacorea geniculata (Lundell) Lundell; Heterotypic Synonyms: Ardisia terrabana Lundell; Icacorea terrabana (Lundell) Lundell

Species of flowering plant

Ardisia geniculata is a species of flowering plant in the family Primulaceae. It is native to Costa Rica and Panama.
