= Ardisia nigrovirens =

Conservation status
- Near Threatened (IUCN 2.3)

Scientific classification
- Kingdom: Plantae
- Clade: Tracheophytes
- Clade: Angiosperms
- Clade: Eudicots
- Clade: Asterids
- Order: Ericales
- Family: Primulaceae
- Genus: Ardisia
- Species: A. nigrovirens

Binomial name
- Ardisia nigrovirens J. F. Macbr.

Species of plant

Ardisia nigrovirens is a species of plant in the family Primulaceae. It is endemic to Peru.
