= Ardisia panamensis =

Conservation status
- Vulnerable (IUCN 2.3)

Scientific classification
- Kingdom: Plantae
- Clade: Tracheophytes
- Clade: Angiosperms
- Clade: Eudicots
- Clade: Asterids
- Order: Ericales
- Family: Primulaceae
- Genus: Ardisia
- Species: A. panamensis

Binomial name
- Ardisia panamensis Lundell

Synonyms
- Homotypic Synonyms: Auriculardisia panamensis (Lundell) Lundell; Heterotypic Synonyms: Ardisia pallidiflora Standl.

Species of flowering plant

Ardisia panamensis is a species of flowering plant in the family Primulaceae. It is endemic to Panama. It is threatened by habitat loss.
