= Ardisia costaricensis =

Conservation status
- Least Concern (IUCN 3.1)

Scientific classification
- Kingdom: Plantae
- Clade: Tracheophytes
- Clade: Angiosperms
- Clade: Eudicots
- Clade: Asterids
- Order: Ericales
- Family: Primulaceae
- Genus: Ardisia
- Species: A. costaricensis

Binomial name
- Ardisia costaricensis Lundell

Synonyms
- Synonymy: Ardisia albipedicellata Pipoly & Ricketson; Ardisia albipetala (Lundell) Pipoly & Ricketson; Ardisia baruana Lundell; Ardisia bekomiensis (Lundell) J.F.Morales; Ardisia chiriquiensis Lundell; Ardisia clavelligera Lundell; Ardisia duripetala (Lundell) Pipoly & Ricketson; Ardisia guanacastensis (Lundell) Pipoly & Ricketson; Ardisia guancheana Lundell; Ardisia kallunkii Lundell; Ardisia maasolae Lundell; Ardisia matagalpana Lundell; Ardisia microcalyx Lundell; Ardisia mombachoana Lundell; Ardisia morii Lundell; Ardisia rivasensis Lundell; Ardisia triangula (Lundell) Pipoly & Ricketson; Ardisia utleyi (Lundell) Pipoly & Ricketson; Ardisia warneri Pipoly & Ricketson; Ardisia warneri Lundell; Icacorea albipetala Lundell; Icacorea baruana (Lundell) Lundell; Icacorea bekomiensis Lundell; Icacorea brevipes Lundell; Icacorea chiriquiensis (Lundell) Lundell; Icacorea clavelligera (Lundell) Lundell; Icacorea costaricensis (Lundell) Lundell; Icacorea duripetala Lundell; Icacorea guanacastensis Lundell; Icacorea guancheana (Lundell) Lundell; Icacorea kallunkii (Lundell) Lundell; Icacorea maasolae (Lundell) Lundell; Icacorea matagalpana (Lundell) Lundell; Icacorea microcalyx (Lundell) Lundell; Icacorea mombachoana (Lundell) Lundell; Icacorea morii (Lundell) Lundell; Icacorea parvifolia Lundell; Icacorea rivasensis (Lundell) Lundell; Icacorea triangula Lundell; Icacorea utleyi Lundell

Species of flowering plant

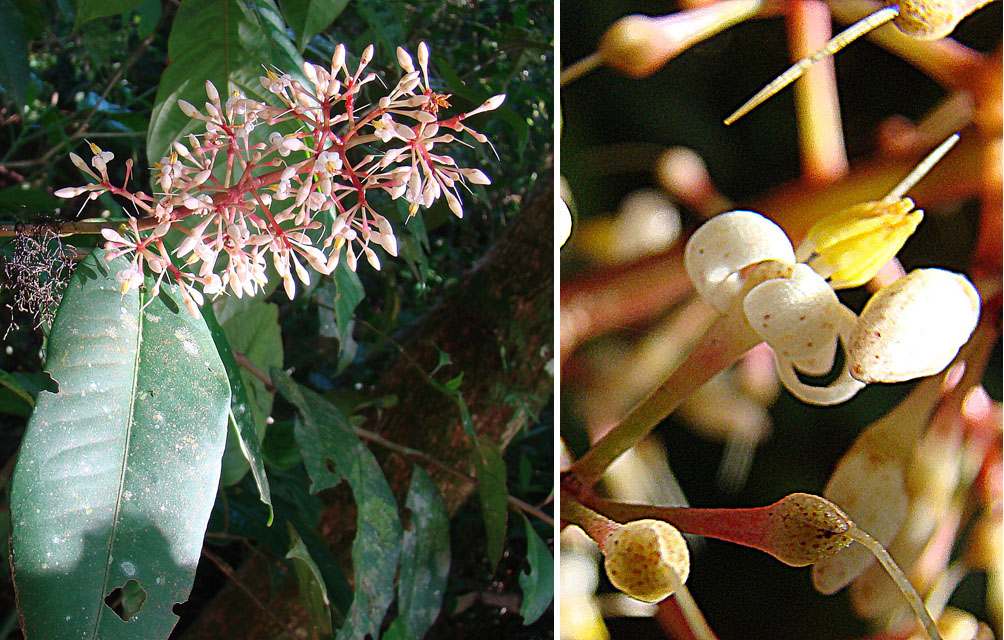
Ardisia costaricensis

Ardisia costaricensis is a species of flowering plant in the family Primulaceae. It is a shrub native to Costa Rica, Honduras, Nicaragua, and Panama in Central America, where it grows in lowland and montane tropical rain forests. The IUCN Red List assesses the species as Least Concern.

The species was first described in 1942 by Cyrus Longworth Lundell.
