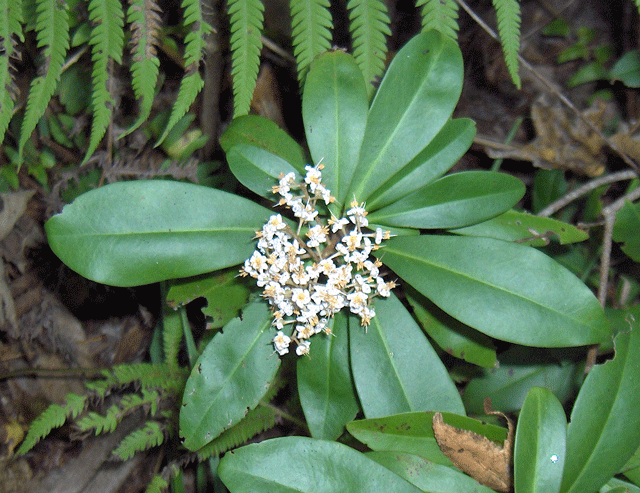

Conservation status
- Least Concern (IUCN 3.1)

- Apparently Secure (NatureServe)

Scientific classification
- Kingdom: Plantae
- Clade: Tracheophytes
- Clade: Angiosperms
- Clade: Eudicots
- Clade: Asterids
- Order: Ericales
- Family: Primulaceae
- Genus: Ardisia
- Species: A. escallonioides

Binomial name
- Ardisia escallonioides Schltdl. & Cham.

Synonyms
- Ardisia pickeringia Torr. & A. Gray ex A. DC.; Bladhia paniculata (Nutt.) Sudw. ex Sarg.; Cyrilla paniculata Nutt.; Icacorea paniculata (Nutt.) Sudw.; Pickeringia paniculata (Nutt.) Nutt.; Tinus escallonioides (Schltdl. & Cham.) Kuntze; Tinus pickeringia (Torr. & A. Gray ex A. DC.) Kuntze

= Ardisia escallonioides =

Island marlberry

Species of flowering plant

Ardisia escallonioides, the Island marlberry, is a plant species native to the West Indies and neighboring areas. It has been reported from Barbados, Bermuda, the Dominican Republic, Cuba, Mexico, Belize, Guatemala and Florida.

Ardisia escallonioides is a shrub or tree up to 15 m (50 feet) tall. It has elliptic leaves up to 17 cm (7 in) long. Flowers are borne in a panicle of up to 20 flowers. Each flower is white to pink, up to 7 mm (0.3 in) across. Fruits are fleshy drupes up to 7 mm (0.3 in) across, red at first then turning black.

== Uses ==
Fruits of A. escallonioides are reported to be edible, but some consider the taste to be unpleasant.
