= Ardisia blatteri =

Conservation status
- Endangered (IUCN 2.3)

Scientific classification
- Kingdom: Plantae
- Clade: Tracheophytes
- Clade: Angiosperms
- Clade: Eudicots
- Clade: Asterids
- Order: Ericales
- Family: Primulaceae
- Genus: Ardisia
- Species: A. blatteri

Binomial name
- Ardisia blatteri Gamble

Species of flowering plant

Ardisia blatteri is a species of flowering plant in the family Primulaceae. It is a tree native to the southernmost Western Ghats of Kerala and Tamil Nadu in southern India. It grows in submontane evergreen forest.
