= Ardisia premontana =

Conservation status
- Vulnerable (IUCN 2.3)

Scientific classification
- Kingdom: Plantae
- Clade: Tracheophytes
- Clade: Angiosperms
- Clade: Eudicots
- Clade: Asterids
- Order: Ericales
- Family: Primulaceae
- Genus: Ardisia
- Species: A. premontana

Binomial name
- Ardisia premontana Pipoly

Species of flowering plant

Ardisia premontana is a species of plant in the family Primulaceae. It is found in Ecuador and Peru.
