= Ardisia websteri =

Conservation status
- Vulnerable (IUCN 3.1)

Scientific classification
- Kingdom: Plantae
- Clade: Tracheophytes
- Clade: Angiosperms
- Clade: Eudicots
- Clade: Asterids
- Order: Ericales
- Family: Primulaceae
- Genus: Ardisia
- Species: A. websteri

Binomial name
- Ardisia websteri Pipoly

Species of flowering plant

Ardisia websteri is a species of plant in the family Primulaceae. It is endemic to Ecuador.
