= Ardisia willisii =

Scientific classification
- Kingdom: Plantae
- Clade: Embryophytes
- Clade: Tracheophytes
- Clade: Spermatophytes
- Clade: Angiosperms
- Clade: Eudicots
- Clade: Asterids
- Order: Ericales
- Family: Primulaceae
- Genus: Ardisia
- Species: A. willisii

Binomial name
- Ardisia willisii Mez

Synonyms
- Heterotypic Synonyms: Ardisia moonii var. subsessilis C.B.Clarke

Species of flowering plant

Ardisia willisii is a species of flowering plant in the family Primulaceae. It is endemic to Sri Lanka.

== Ecology ==
Coastal areas.

== Uses ==
Fruit- edible; whole plant- medicinal; ornamental.
