= Ardisia gardneri =

Scientific classification
- Kingdom: Plantae
- Clade: Tracheophytes
- Clade: Angiosperms
- Clade: Eudicots
- Clade: Asterids
- Order: Ericales
- Family: Primulaceae
- Genus: Ardisia
- Species: A. gardneri

Binomial name
- Ardisia gardneri C.B Clarke

Species of flowering plant

Ardisia gardneri is a species of plant in the family Primulaceae. It is endemic to Sri Lanka.
