= Ardisia helferiana =

Scientific classification
- Kingdom: Plantae
- Clade: Tracheophytes
- Clade: Angiosperms
- Clade: Eudicots
- Clade: Asterids
- Order: Ericales
- Family: Primulaceae
- Genus: Ardisia
- Species: A. helferiana

Binomial name
- Ardisia helferiana Kurz

Synonyms
- Ardisia albiflora Pit.; Ardisia crispipila Merr.; Ardisia dinhensis Pit.; Ardisia helferiana var. septentrionalis Pit.; Ardisia villosula Pit.; Tinus helferiana (Kurz) Kuntze

Species of flowering plant

Ardisia helferiana is a species of flowering plant in the genus Ardisia in the family Primulaceae. Growing as a shrub, it occurs in Mainland Southeast Asia. The plant is used for food, fuel and medicine.

== Description, habitat, distribution ==
It grows some 1-3m high, with leaves grouped at the top of the trunk. It is found in littoral forests in Thailand, Cambodia, Vietnam, Laos, and Myanmar. In the coastal Sattahip area, Chonburi Province, eastern Thailand, the shrub is found in swamp forest (permanently wet, stagnant, with tall trees and low scrubby understorey) and in evergreen forest in undisturbed upland areas, usually very rocky and quite steep.

== Vernacular names ==
Thai common names include somkung khon and kang pla. In Cambodia common names include chhnôk thma:t ba:t, and chum'pu: préi (chum'pu:="apple-rose", préi="wild", Khmer).

== Uses ==
Amongst villagers living around the Bung Khong Long Non-Hunting Area, of Bueng Khong Long District, northeastern Thailand, the ripe fruit is eaten from March to June, while young leaves are eaten fresh or as soft-boiled vegetables from March to September.

In Cambodia, the fruit is eaten, while the wood is used as firewood.

Indigenous medical use of the plant is reported by the Chief Herbalist at Kungkrabaen Royal Development Study Center, Chanthaburi province, eastern Thailand, to treat fever a decoction of the root is prepared and given to drink.
