= Ardisia furfuracella =

Conservation status
- Vulnerable (IUCN 2.3)

Scientific classification
- Kingdom: Plantae
- Clade: Tracheophytes
- Clade: Angiosperms
- Clade: Eudicots
- Clade: Asterids
- Order: Ericales
- Family: Primulaceae
- Genus: Ardisia
- Species: A. furfuracella

Binomial name
- Ardisia furfuracella Standl.

Species of flowering plant

Ardisia furfuracella is a species of plant in the family Primulaceae. It is found in Costa Rica and Panama.
