= Ardisia scortechinii =

Conservation status
- Data Deficient (IUCN 3.1)

Scientific classification
- Kingdom: Plantae
- Clade: Tracheophytes
- Clade: Angiosperms
- Clade: Eudicots
- Clade: Asterids
- Order: Ericales
- Family: Primulaceae
- Genus: Ardisia
- Species: A. scortechinii

Binomial name
- Ardisia scortechinii King & Gamble

Species of tree

Ardisia scortechinii is a species of plant in the family Primulaceae. It is a tree endemic to Peninsular Malaysia.
