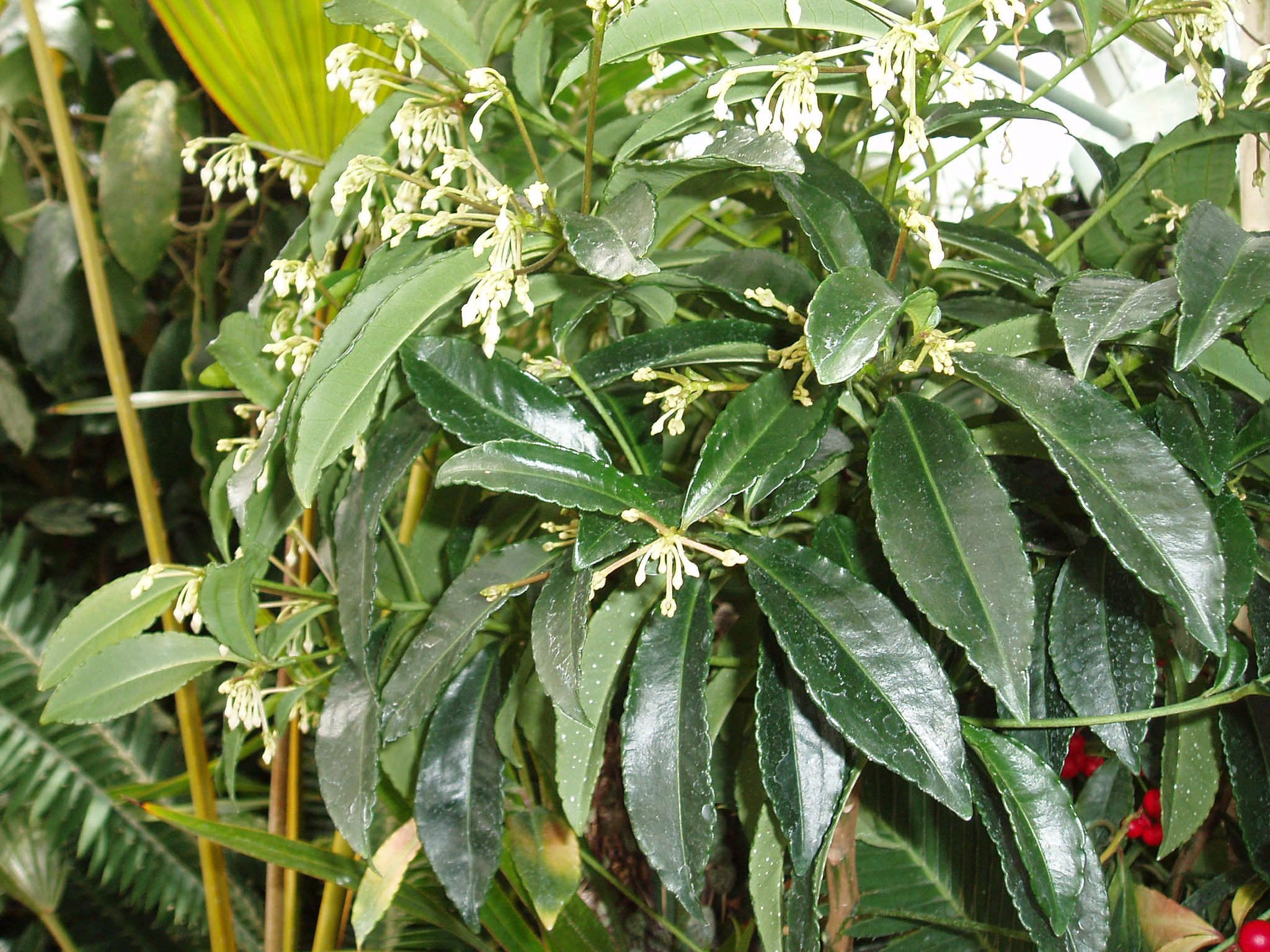

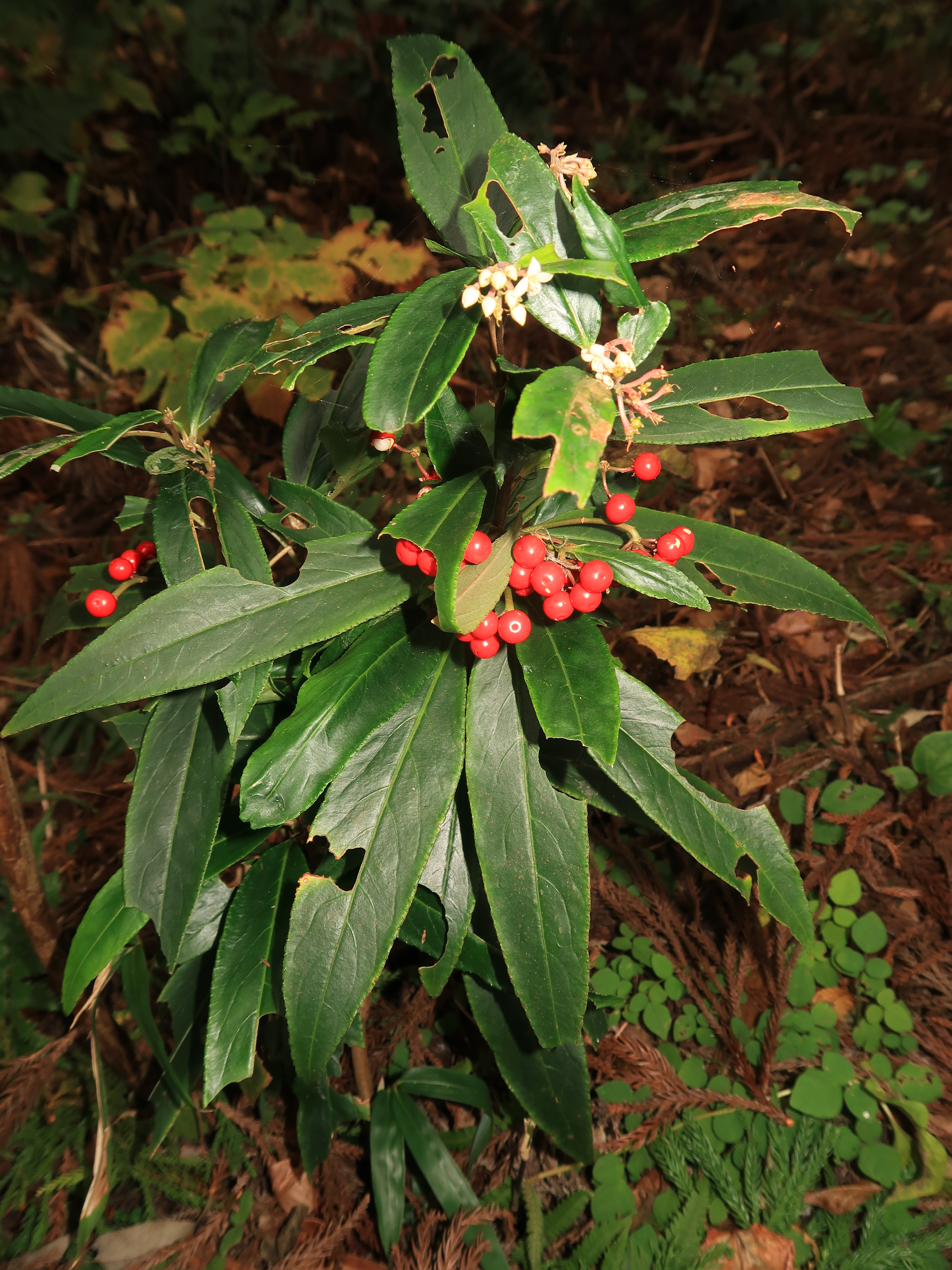
- Habit

Scientific classification
- Kingdom: Plantae
- Clade: Embryophytes
- Clade: Tracheophytes
- Clade: Spermatophytes
- Clade: Angiosperms
- Clade: Eudicots
- Clade: Asterids
- Order: Ericales
- Family: Primulaceae
- Genus: Ardisia
- Species: A. crispa

Binomial name
- Ardisia crispa (Thunb.) A.DC.

Synonyms
- List: Ardisia crispa f. leucocarpa (Nakai) H.Ohashi; Ardisia crispa f. xanthocarpa (Nakai) H.Ohashi; Ardisia dielsii H.Lév.; Ardisia henryi Hemsl.; Ardisia hortorum Maxim.; Ardisia multicaulis Z.Y.Zhu; Ardisia simplicicaulis Hayata; Ardisia undulata C.B.Clarke; Bladhia crispa Thunb.; Tinus crispa (Thunb.) Kuntze; Tinus henryi (Hemsl.) Kuntze; Tinus undulata (C.B.Clarke) Kuntze

= Ardisia crispa =

Species of flowering plant

Ardisia crispa, the Japanese holly, is a species of flowering plant in the family Primulaceae. It is found in the eastern Himalayas, Assam, southern China, Indochina, Taiwan, Korea, the Ryukyu Islands, and Japan, and has been introduced to Queensland, Australia, and the Windward Islands in the Caribbean. An evergreen perennial shrub reaching at most 1.5 m (5 ft), it is often sold as an ornamental for its dark green leaves and long‑lasting red berries, much like Ardisia crenata, the Christmas berry or coralberry.

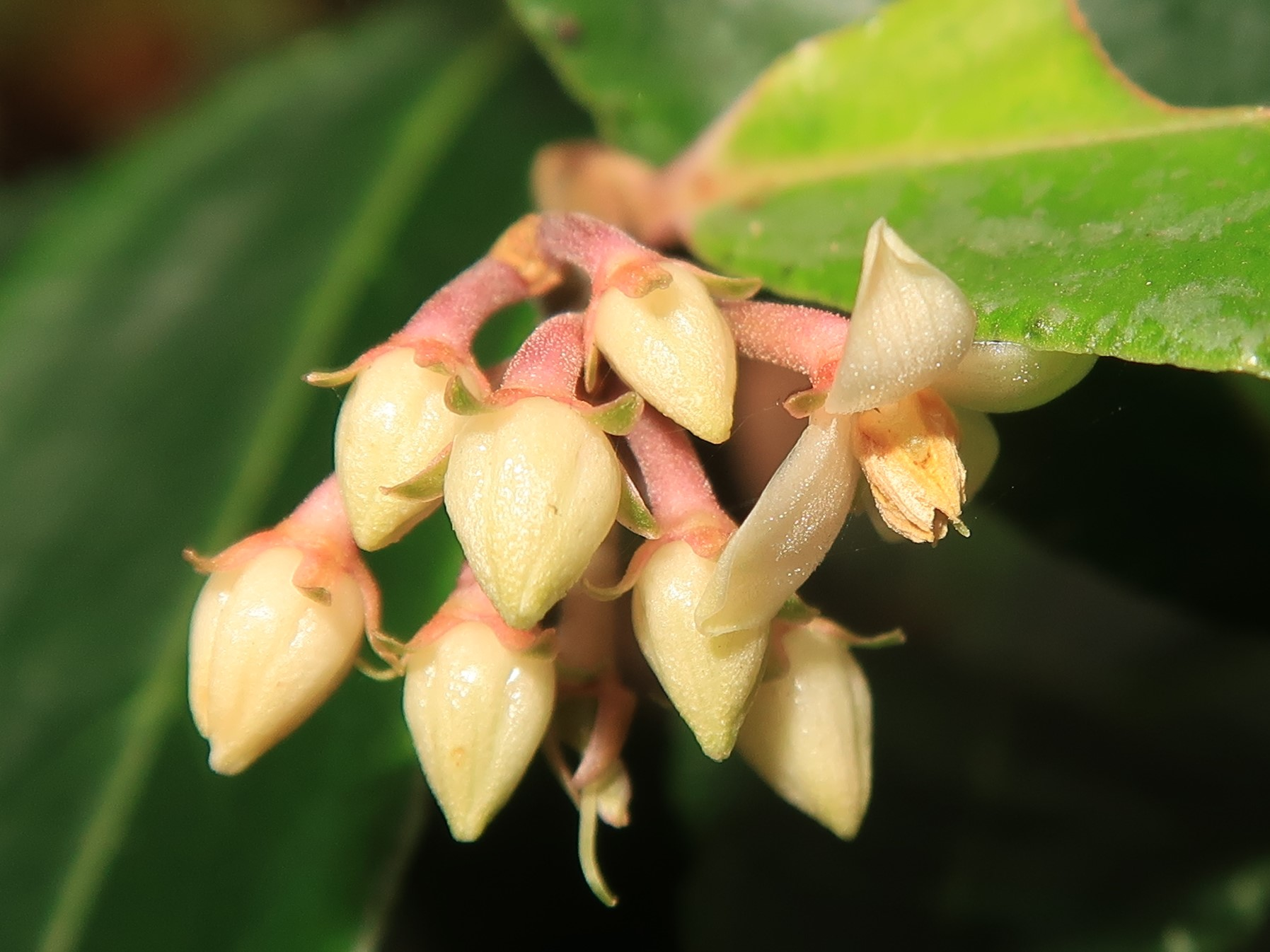
Flowers

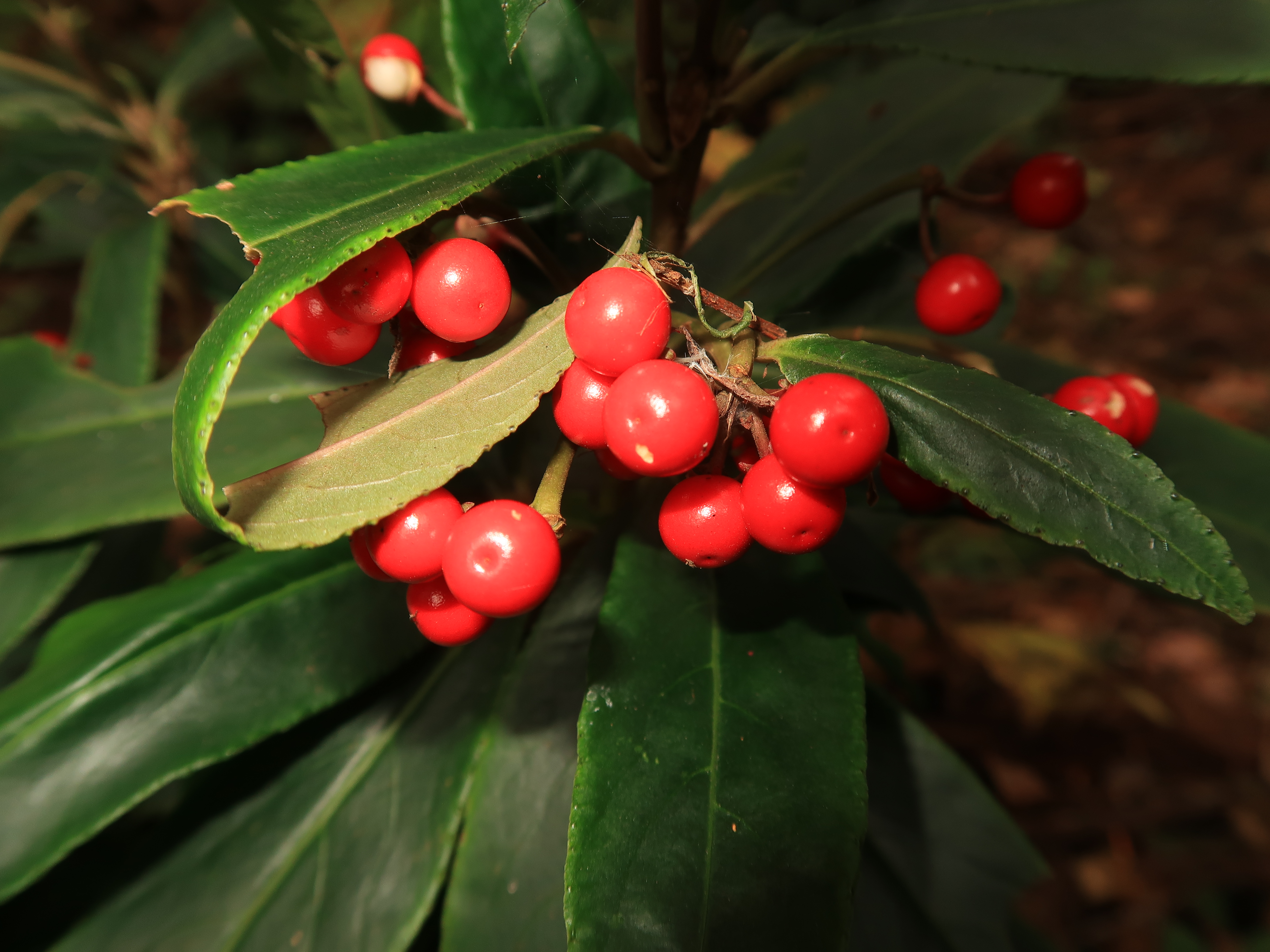
Fruit
