= Ardisia solida =

Scientific classification
- Kingdom: Plantae
- Clade: Tracheophytes
- Clade: Angiosperms
- Clade: Eudicots
- Clade: Asterids
- Order: Ericales
- Family: Primulaceae
- Genus: Ardisia
- Species: A. solida

Binomial name
- Ardisia solida B.C.Stone

Species of flowering plant

Ardisia solida is a species of plant in the family Primulaceae. It can be found in Malaysia.
