= Ardisia standleyana =

Conservation status
- Least Concern (IUCN 2.3)

Scientific classification
- Kingdom: Plantae
- Clade: Tracheophytes
- Clade: Angiosperms
- Clade: Eudicots
- Clade: Asterids
- Order: Ericales
- Family: Primulaceae
- Genus: Ardisia
- Species: A. standleyana

Binomial name
- Ardisia standleyana P.H.Allen

Synonyms
- Ardisia polyantha Lundell; Ardisia polydactyla Lundell; Icacorea polyantha (Lundell) Lundell; Icacorea polydactyla (Lundell) Lundell; Icacorea standleyana (P.H.Allen) Lundell

Species of flowering plant

Ardisia standleyana is a species of flowering plant in the family Primulaceae. It is a shrub which ranges from Honduras through Nicaragua, Costa Rica, Panama to Colombia.
