= Ardisia pulverulenta =

Conservation status
- Least Concern (IUCN 2.3)

Scientific classification
- Kingdom: Plantae
- Clade: Tracheophytes
- Clade: Angiosperms
- Clade: Eudicots
- Clade: Asterids
- Order: Ericales
- Family: Primulaceae
- Genus: Ardisia
- Species: A. pulverulenta

Binomial name
- Ardisia pulverulenta Mez

Synonyms
- Auriculardisia pulverulenta (Mez) Lundell

Species of flowering plant

Ardisia pulverulenta is a species of flowering plant in the family Primulaceae. It a shrub or tree endemic to Panama.
