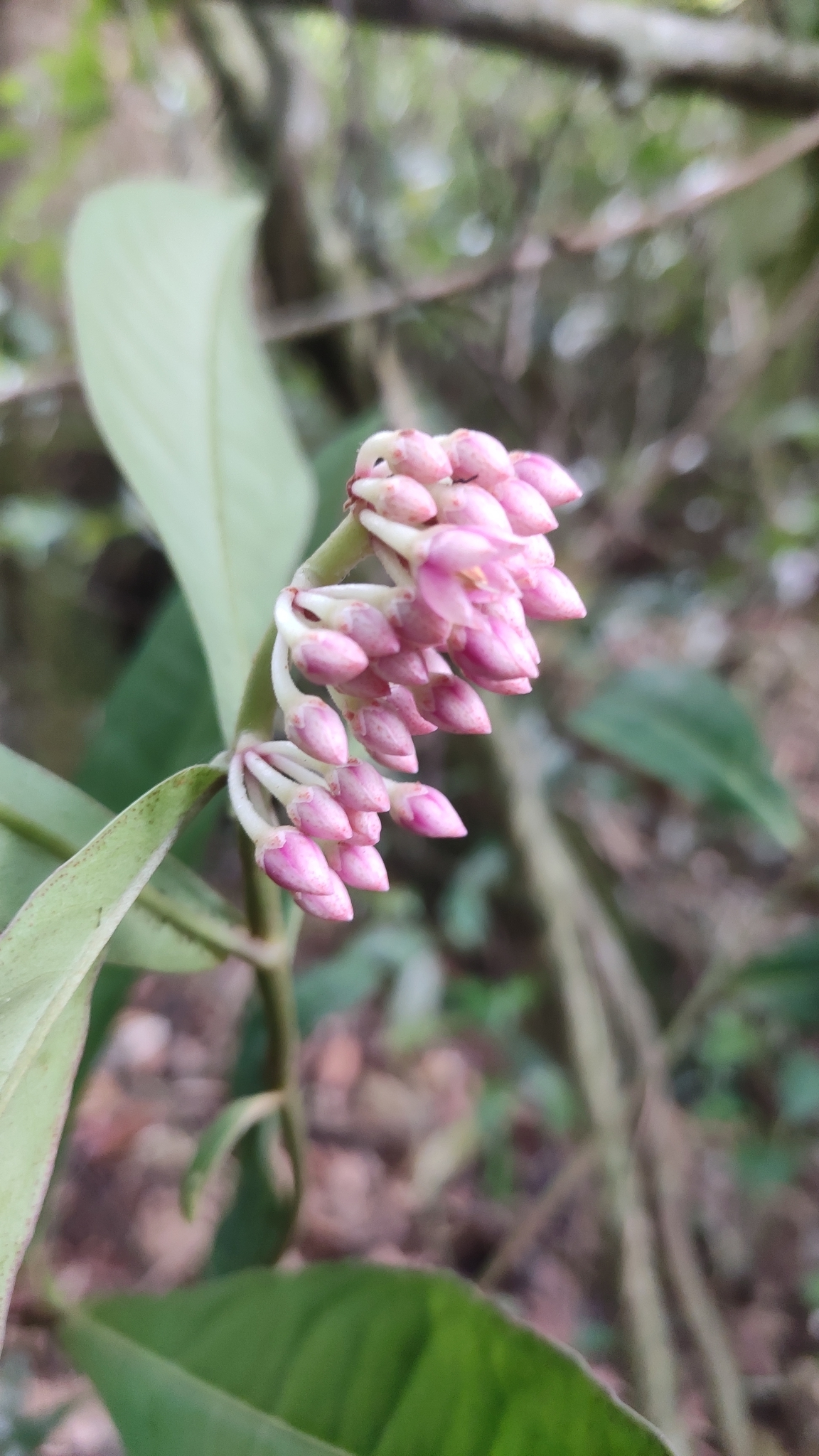

Conservation status
- Endangered (IUCN 2.3)

Scientific classification
- Kingdom: Plantae
- Clade: Tracheophytes
- Clade: Angiosperms
- Clade: Eudicots
- Clade: Asterids
- Order: Ericales
- Family: Primulaceae
- Genus: Ardisia
- Species: A. sonchifolia

Binomial name
- Ardisia sonchifolia Mez

= Ardisia sonchifolia =

Species of flowering plant

Ardisia sonchifolia is a species of plant in the family Primulaceae. It is a shrub endemic to Kerala in southern India. It is native to the Anamalai range of the southern Western Ghats, where it grows in submontane forest.

The species was first described by Carl Christian Mez in 1902.
