= Ardisia byrsonimae =

Conservation status
- Critically Endangered (IUCN 3.1)

Scientific classification
- Kingdom: Plantae
- Clade: Tracheophytes
- Clade: Angiosperms
- Clade: Eudicots
- Clade: Asterids
- Order: Ericales
- Family: Primulaceae
- Genus: Ardisia
- Species: A. byrsonimae

Binomial name
- Ardisia byrsonimae Stearn

Species of flowering plant

Ardisia byrsonimae is a species of plant in the family Primulaceae. It is endemic to Jamaica.
