= Ardisia amplexicaulis =

Conservation status
- Endangered (IUCN 2.3)

Scientific classification
- Kingdom: Plantae
- Clade: Tracheophytes
- Clade: Angiosperms
- Clade: Eudicots
- Clade: Asterids
- Order: Ericales
- Family: Primulaceae
- Genus: Ardisia
- Species: A. amplexicaulis

Binomial name
- Ardisia amplexicaulis Bedd.

Species of flowering plant

Ardisia amplexicaulis is a species of plant in the family Primulaceae. It is a small tree endemic to the Western Ghats of southern India. It lives in submontane evergreen forest. it has been collected from the Agasthyamalai Hills and the Wayanad area, and is considered Endangered.
