= Ardisia schlechteri =

Conservation status
- Critically Endangered (IUCN 2.3)

Scientific classification
- Kingdom: Plantae
- Clade: Tracheophytes
- Clade: Angiosperms
- Clade: Eudicots
- Clade: Asterids
- Order: Ericales
- Family: Primulaceae
- Genus: Ardisia
- Species: A. schlechteri

Binomial name
- Ardisia schlechteri Gilg

Synonyms
- Afrardisia schlechteri (Gilg) Mez

Species of flowering plant

Ardisia schlechteri is a species of flowering plant in family Primulaceae. It is endemic to Cameroon. Its natural habitat is subtropical or tropical dry forests. It is threatened by habitat loss.
