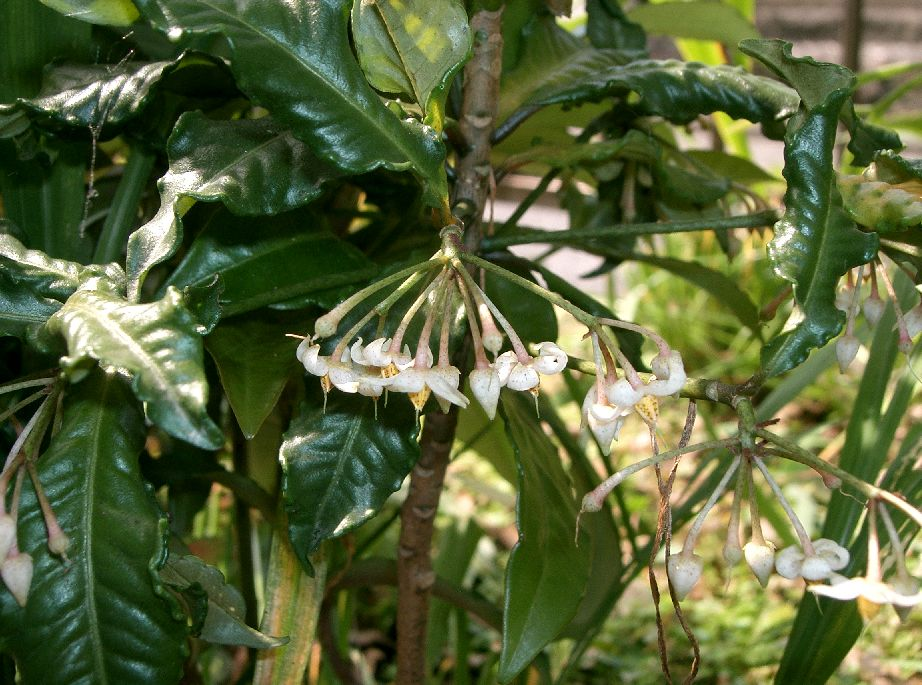
- Ardisia crenata

Scientific classification
- Kingdom: Plantae
- Clade: Embryophytes
- Clade: Tracheophytes
- Clade: Angiosperms
- Clade: Eudicots
- Clade: Asterids
- Order: Ericales
- Family: Primulaceae
- Subfamily: Myrsinoideae
- Genus: Ardisia; Sw.

Type species
- Ardisia tinifolia Sw.

Species
- Over 700, see list of Ardisia species

Synonyms
- 28 synonyms: Rosaura Noronha; Afrardisia Mez; Amatlania Lundell; Anguillaria Gaertn.; Auriculardisia Lundell; Barthesia Comm. ex A.DC.; Bladhia Thunb.; Chontalesia Lundell; Climacandra Miq.; Galiziola Raf.; Gentlea Lundell; Graphardisia (Mez) Lundell; Ibarraea Lundell; Icacorea Aubl.; Milnea Raf.; Niara Dennst.; Oerstedianthus Lundell; Parardisia M.P.Nayar & G.S.Giri; Pickeringia Nutt.; Pimelandra A.DC.; Pyrgus Lour.; Stigmatococca Willd.; Strangula Noronha; Synardisia (Mez) Lundell; Tetrardisia Mez; Valerioanthus Lundell; Vedela Adans.; Zunilia Lundell

= Ardisia =

Genus of flowering plants

Ardisia (coralberry or marlberry) is a genus of flowering plants in the family Primulaceae. It was in the former Myrsinaceae family now recognised as the myrsine sub-family Myrsinoideae. They are distributed in the Americas, Asia, Australia, and the Pacific Islands, mainly in the tropics. There are over 700 accepted species. One species, Ardisia japonica, is one of the 50 fundamental herbs in traditional Chinese medicine.

These are trees, shrubs, and subshrubs. Most have alternately arranged leaves. Flowers are borne in many forms of inflorescence. The flowers have usually 4 or 5 green sepals and a bell-shaped corolla of usually 4 or 5 white or pink petals. The fruit is a somewhat fleshy drupe. The defining characteristic of the genus is the small tube formed at the center of the flower by the stamens, which are joined at their bases.

Several Ardisia species are the sources of the chemical compounds known as ardisiaquinones.

== Species ==
Selected species include:

- Ardisia amplexicaulis Bedd.
- Ardisia blatteri Gamble
- Ardisia brittonii Stearn
- Ardisia byrsonimae Stearn
- Ardisia crenata Sims
- Ardisia crispa (Thunb.) A.DC.
- Ardisia costaricensis Lundell
- Ardisia darienensis Lundell
- Ardisia dukei Lundell
- Ardisia elliptica Thunb.
- Ardisia escallonioides Schltdl. & Cham.
- Ardisia etindensis Taton
- Ardisia fendleri Lundell
- Ardisia flavida Pipoly
- Ardisia furfuracella Standl.
- Ardisia gardneri C.B.Clarke
- Ardisia geniculata Lundell
- Ardisia glomerata Lundell
- Ardisia hagenii Lundell
- Ardisia helferiana Kurz.
- Ardisia humilis Vahl
- Ardisia jamaicensis Lundell
- Ardisia jefeana Lundell
- Ardisia koupensis Taton
- Ardisia maxonii Standl.
- Ardisia opaca Lundell
- Ardisia panamensis Lundell
- Ardisia premontana Pipoly
- Ardisia pulverulenta Mez
- Ardisia scheryi Lundell
- Ardisia schlechteri Gilg
- Ardisia scortechinii King & Gamble
- Ardisia solanacea Roxb.
- Ardisia solida B.C.Stone
- Ardisia sonchifolia Mez
- Ardisia standleyana P.H.Allen
- Ardisia subsessilifolia Lundell
- Ardisia urbanii Stearn
- Ardisia websteri Pipoly
- Ardisia willisii Mez

== Gallery ==
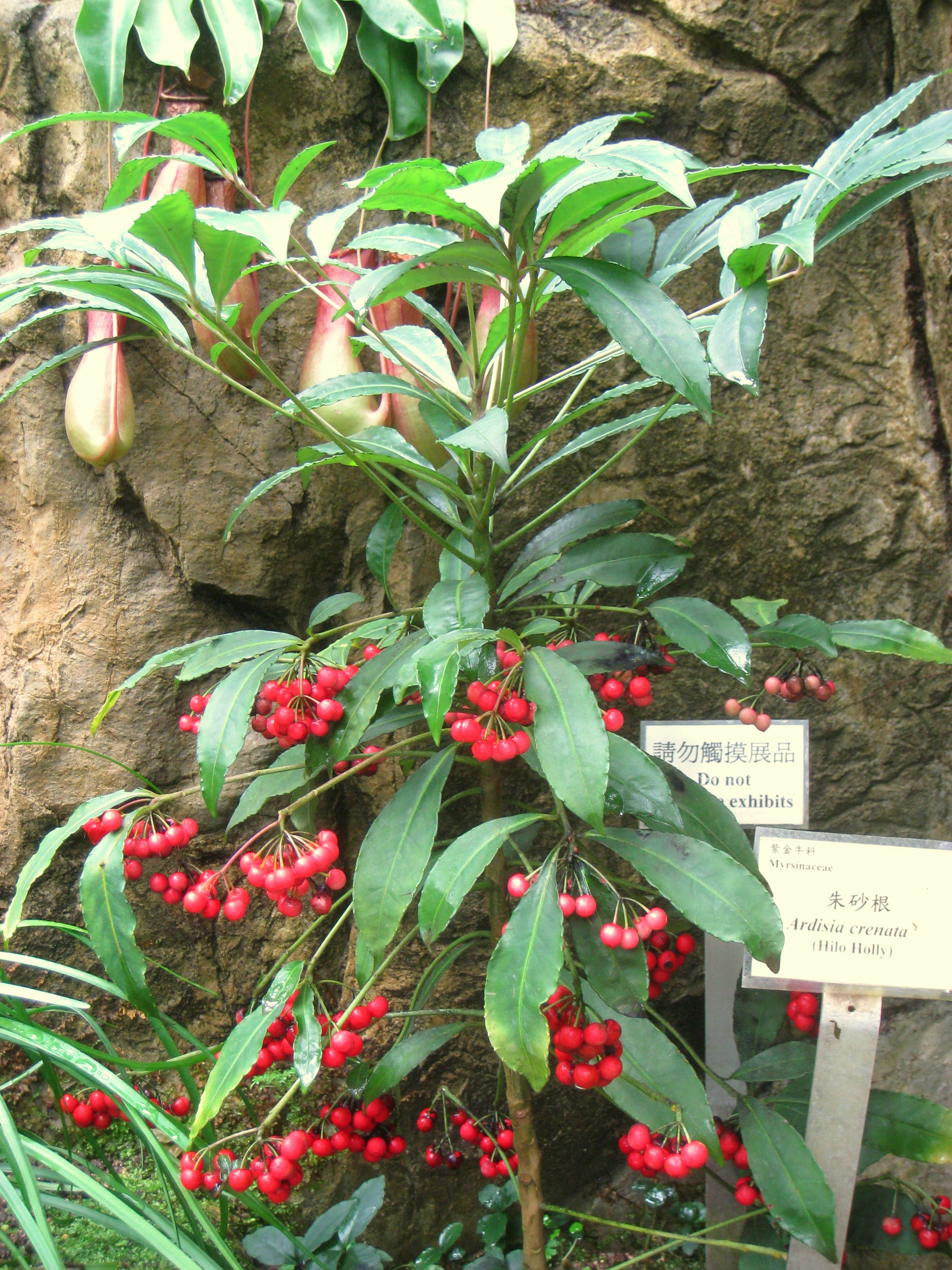
Ardisia crenata

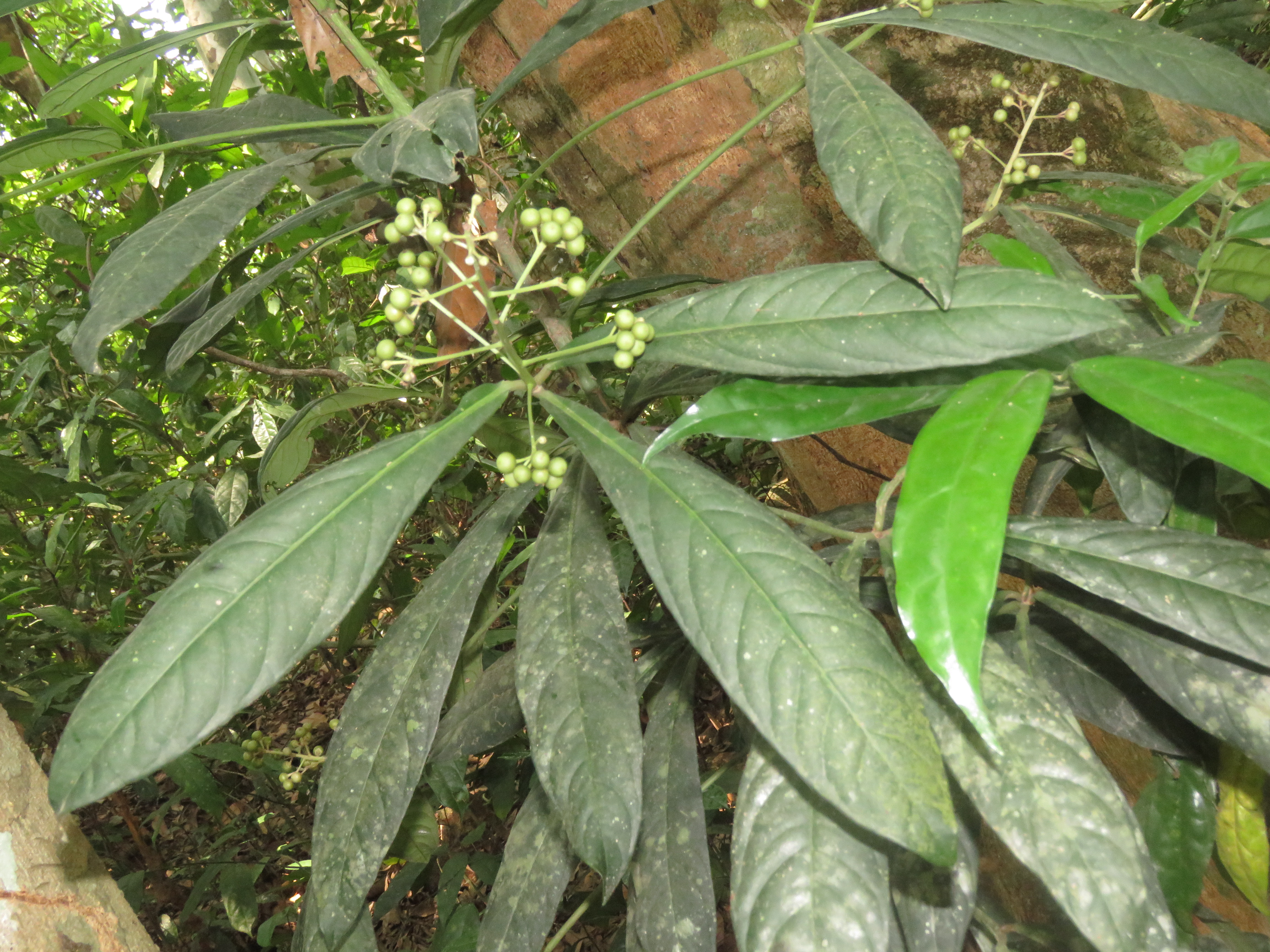
Ardisia rothii

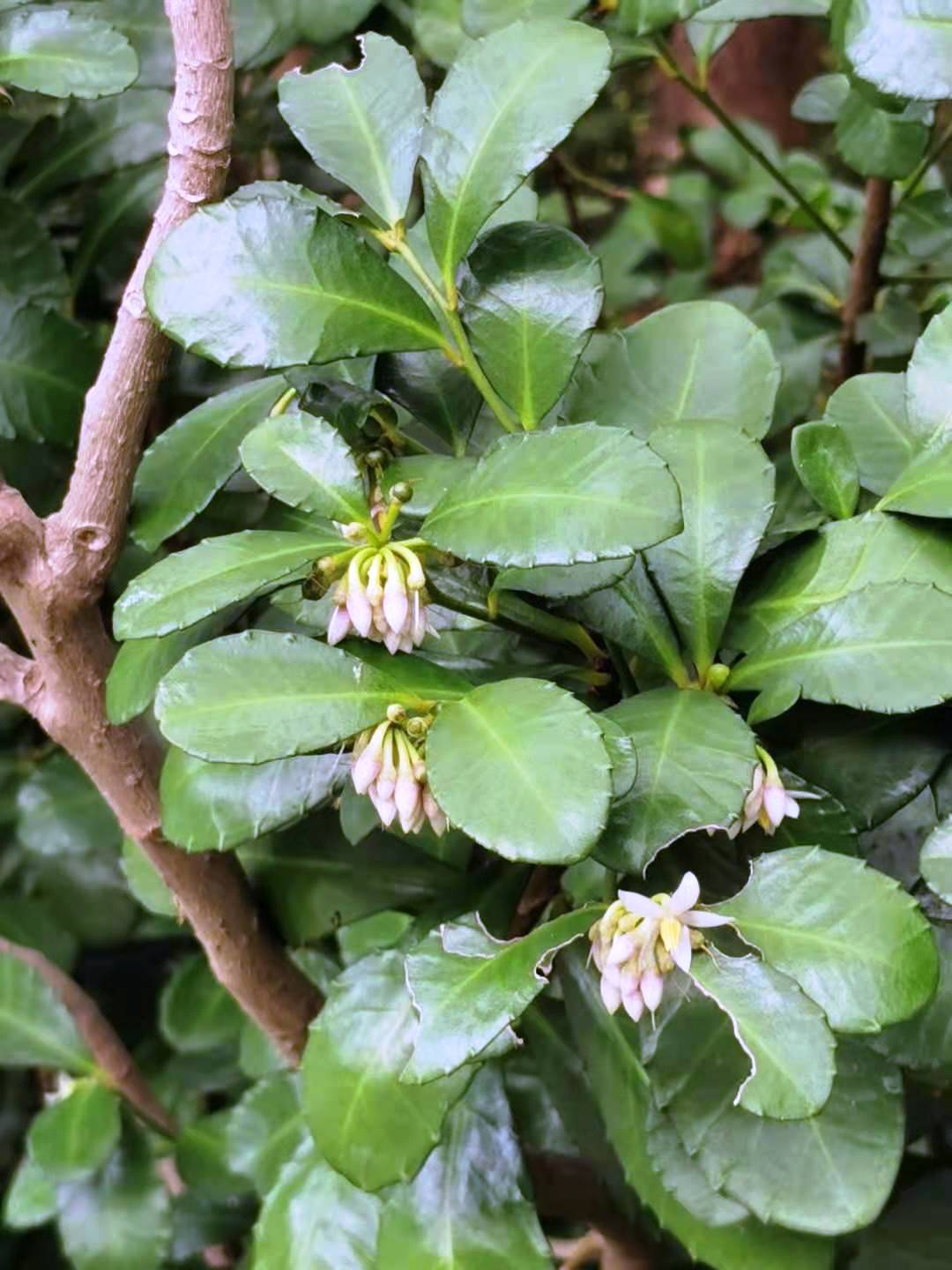
Ardisia cornudentata

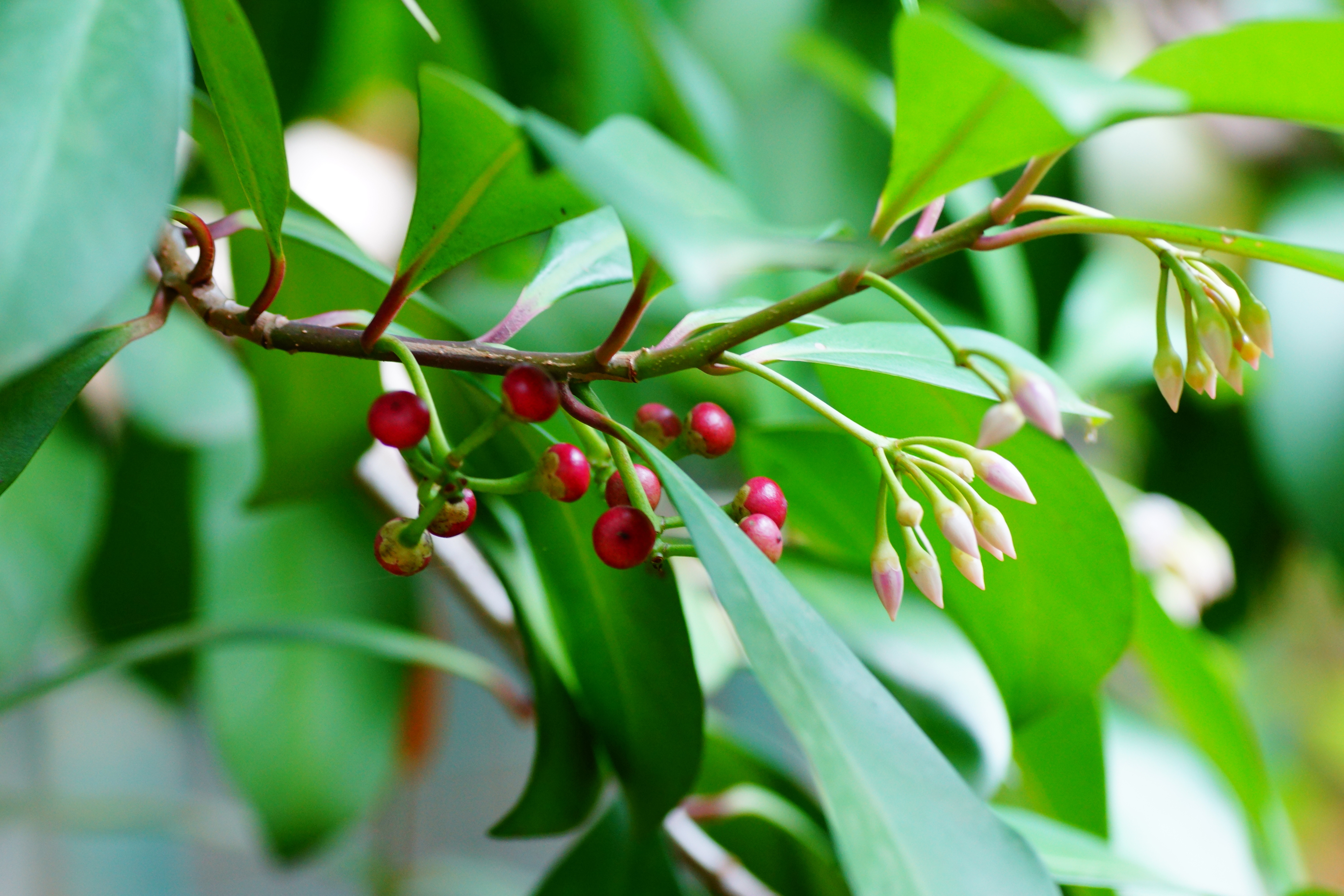
Ardisia forbesii

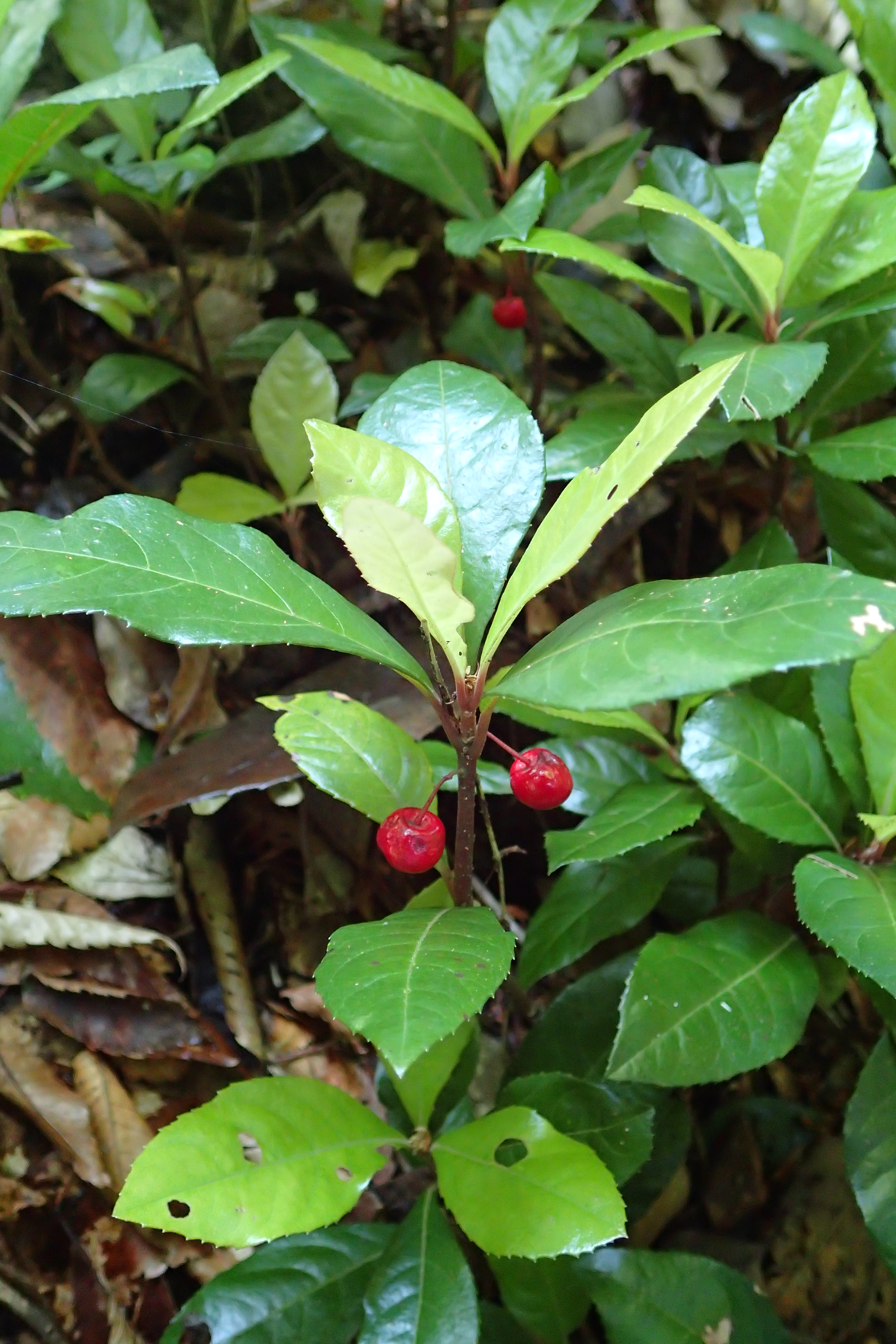
Ardisia japonica
