= Cyrus Longworth Lundell =

American botanist (1907–1994)

- Born: November 5, 1907
- Died: March 28, 1994 (aged 86)
- Scientific career
- Fields: Botany
- Author abbrev. (botany): Lundell

Cyrus Longworth Lundell (November 5, 1907 – March 28, 1994) was an American botanist.

== Education ==
Lundell did his undergraduate studies at Columbia University and he completed a BA at the Southern Methodist University in 1932. He started MA studies at New York University's graduate school of business administration, and received an MA from the University of Michigan in 1934. A Ph.D. from the same institution followed in 1936. His later professorships were in the subject of botany.

== Early achievement ==
At the age of 21, in 1928, Lundell was a sophomore at Southern Methodist University (SMU). He was appointed assistant physiologist at the Tropical Plant Research Foundation in Washington, D.C. He was to assist in British Honduras, with experiments on the sapodilla tree (Achras zapota), which yields chicle, for the U.S. chewing gum industry.

== Chicle ==
Chicle is the natural gum from trees of the genus Manilkara, tropical evergreen trees native to southern North America and South America. It was traditionally used in chewing gum. While the Wrigley Company was a prominent user of this material, today there are only a few companies that still make chewing gum from natural chicle.

== Work ==
Lundell's work was a combination of conservation and economics. He was interested in the Maya culture and archaeology as well as botany. While working for the Tropical Plant Research Foundation in 1931, he identified the location of the Maya city of Calakmul, hidden by jungle for 1,000 years. His plant taxonomy work involves more than 2,000 plants, many of them Texas natives.

== Burial ==
Cyrus Longworth Lundell is entered at Sparkman-Hillcrest Memorial Park Cemetery in Dallas, Texas.

== Legacy ==
Lundell is commemorated in the scientific name of a species of lizard, Sceloporus lundelli.
