= Grevillea 'Peaches and Cream' =

Pear cultivar

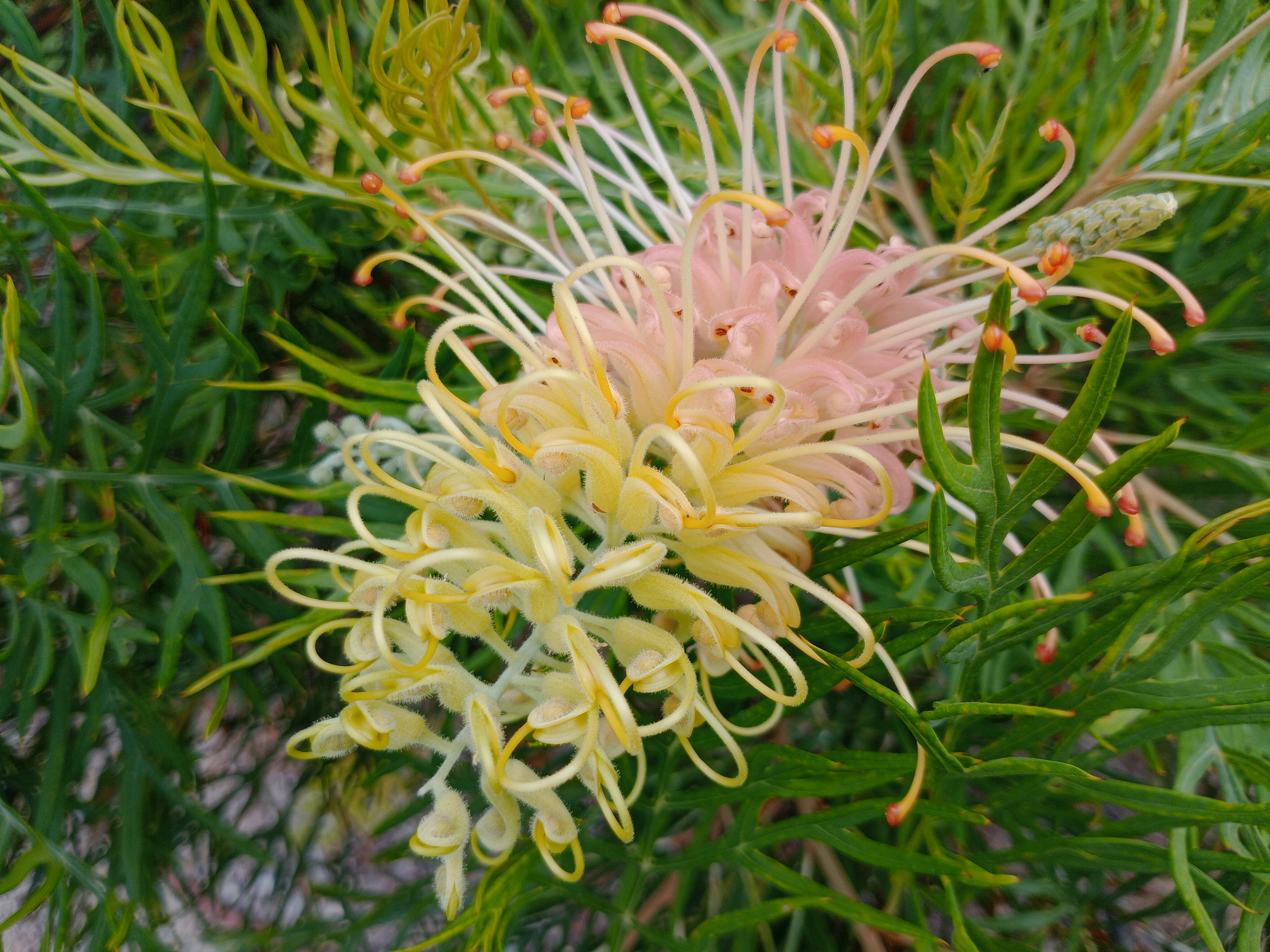
- 'Peaches and Cream' in flower , Breakfast Point, NSW
- Hybrid parentage: Grevillea banksii × Grevillea bipinnatifida
- Cultivar: 'Peaches and Cream'
- Origin: Selected in Queensland

Grevillea 'Peaches and Cream' is a new and much sought-after grevillea cultivar which has been recently released in Australia.

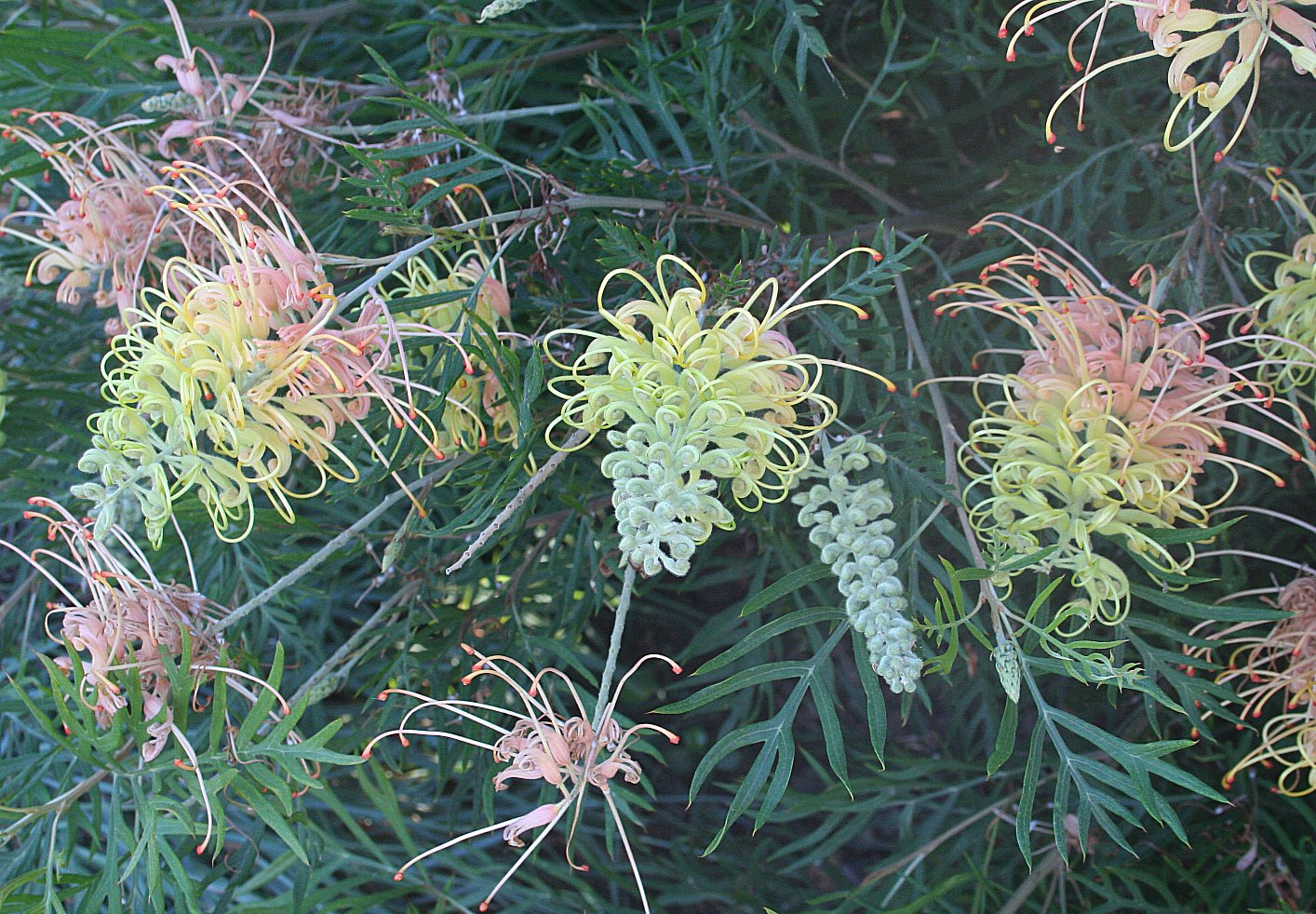
Some at Oakdale, New South Wales.

It is a shrub that grows to 1.2 by 1.5 metres (4–5 ft) in height and width and has bright green attractive deeply divided leaves, around 11.7 centimetres (4.6 in) long by 6.4 centimetres (2.5 in) in width. The foliage takes on a bronze sheen in winter. The inflorescences are about 15 centimetres (5.9 in) long by 9 centimetres (3.5 in) wide and open yellow initially but later add various shades of pink and orange.

The cultivar is a cross between a white-flowered form of the Queensland species Grevillea banksii, and G. bipinnatifida from Western Australia, and was selected from a plant which arose in a garden in Logan Village, a southern suburb of Brisbane, in 1997. It was watched and propagated by Queensland horticulturists and SGAP members Dennis Cox and Janice Glazebrook, finally being patented in 2006.

It is of the same parentage as 'Superb' and 'Robyn Gordon' and has similar prolific and sustained flowering. Grevillea 'Superb' has a deeper orange coloration in the flowers, while G. 'Robyn Gordon' is red.

Its small size lends itself to use in a small garden, and it is bird attracting. It tolerant of a wide range of conditions, including humidity as well as drought, and frost down to −5 °C (23 °F).

Although not yet recorded, the cultivar is very similar to several cultivars which have been known to cause allergic contact dermatitis for certain individuals who come into contact with it, so caution is advised.

== See also ==
- List of Grevillea cultivars
