= Grevillea 'Mason's Hybrid' =

Flowering plant cultivar

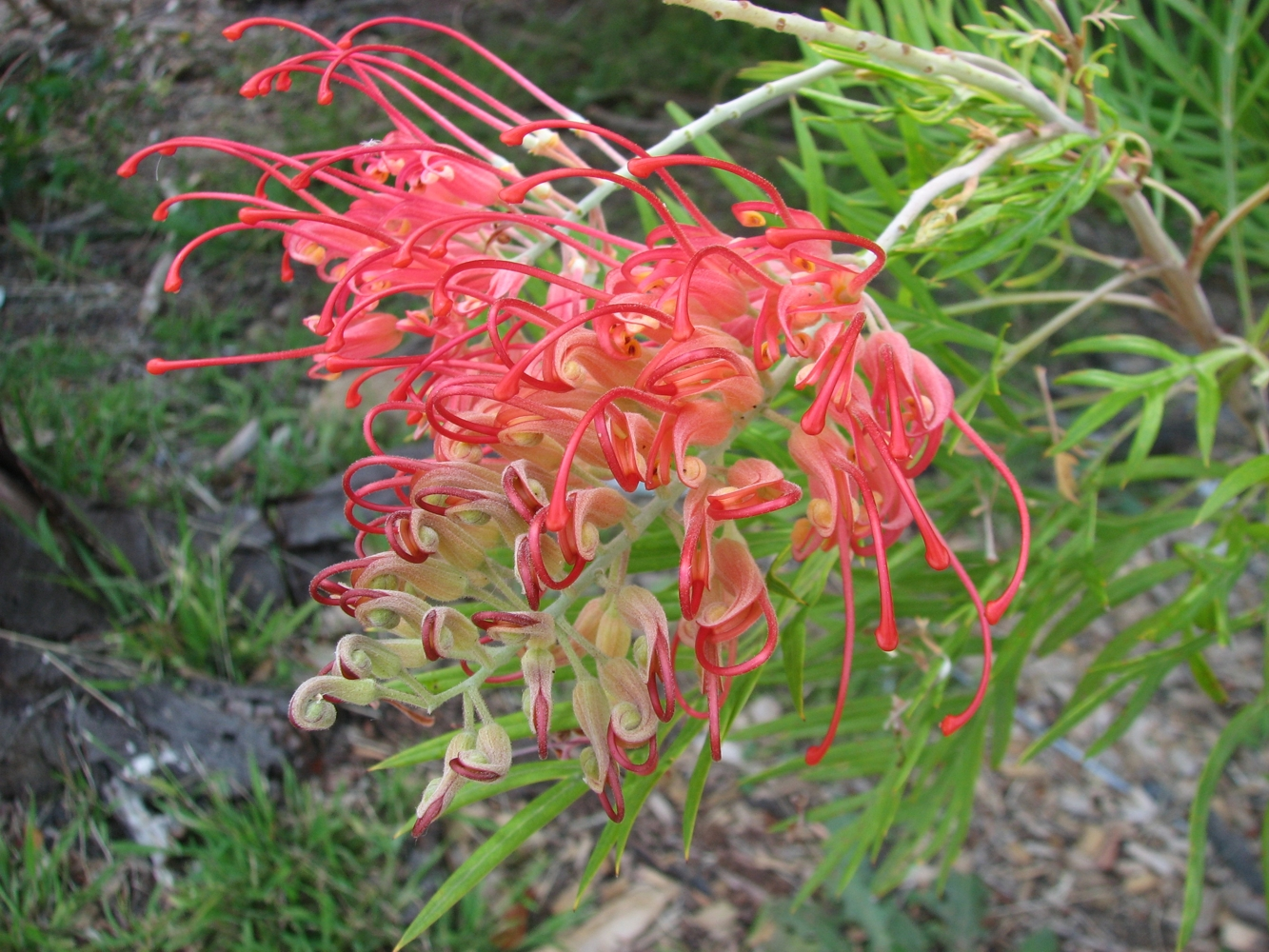
- Hybrid parentage: Grevillea banksii × Grevillea bipinnatifida
- Cultivar: 'Mason's hybrid'
- Origin: Kentlyn Nursery, Kentlyn, New South Wales

Grevillea 'Mason's Hybrid' is a grevillea cultivar. It has also been distributed under the names 'Kentlyn' and 'Ned Kelly'.

It is a shrub that grows to 1.5 metres in height and 2 metres in width and has divided leaves. The inflorescences are about 12 cm long by 10 cm wide, with apricot-coloured perianths and red styles.

The cultivar, which is a cross between Grevillea banksii and an upright glaucous form of G. bipinnatifida, was registered in 1980 by Mr J. B. Mason.
