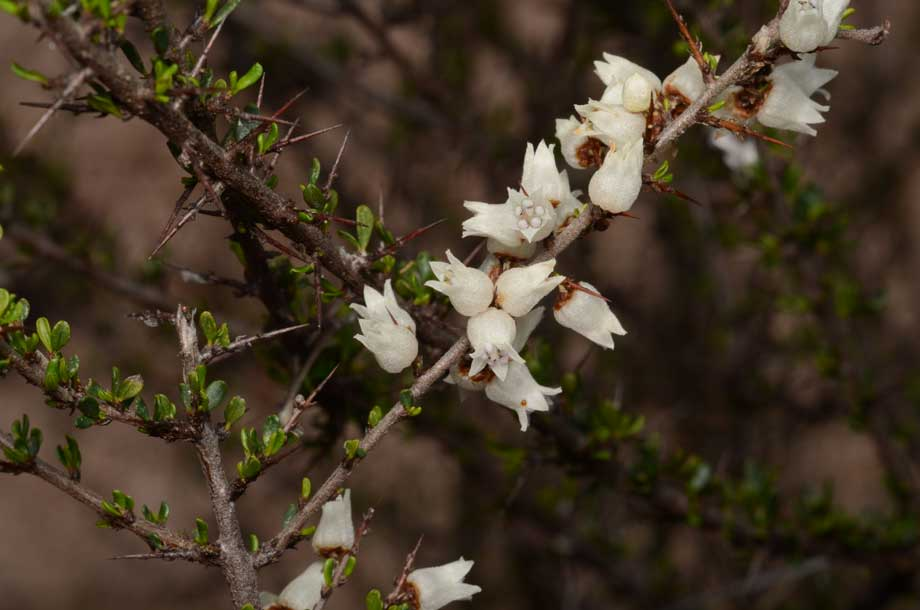
- In Myall Park Botanic Garden

Scientific classification
- Kingdom: Plantae
- Clade: Tracheophytes
- Clade: Angiosperms
- Clade: Eudicots
- Clade: Rosids
- Order: Rosales
- Family: Rhamnaceae
- Genus: Cryptandra
- Species: C. armata

Binomial name
- Cryptandra armata C.T.White & W.D.Francis

= Cryptandra armata =

Species of flowering plant

Cryptandra armata is a flowering plant in the family Rhamnaceae and is endemic to Queensland. It is a shrub with spiny branchlets, spatula-shaped to lance-shaped or egg-shaped leaves with the narrower end towards the base, and creamy-white tube-shaped to bell-shaped flowers.

== Description ==
Cryptandra armata is a shrub that typically grows to a height of up to 1.5 m (4 ft 11 in) and has branchlets 0.5–1.5 m (1 ft 8 in – 4 ft 11 in) long, covered with hairs when young, and ending in a sharp spine. The leaves are spatula-shaped or lance-shaped to egg-shaped with the narrower end towards the base and often clustered, 1.4–5.2 mm (0.055–0.205 in) long and 0.4–1.4 mm (0.016–0.055 in) wide on a petiole 0.3–0.5 mm (0.012–0.020 in) long. There are narrow triangular stipules 0.9–1.4 mm (0.035–0.055 in) long at the base of the petioles. The flowers are usually borne singly on short pedicels with brown bracts at the base. The floral tube is 2.5–3.0 mm (0.098–0.118 in) long, the lobes 1.0–1.6 mm (0.039–0.063 in) long and the petals are white, protruding 1.0–1.2 mm (0.039–0.047 in) beyond the end of the floral tube, and hooded. Flowering occurs from July to September and the fruit is an elliptic capsule, the seeds about 2.3 mm (0.091 in) long with a white aril.

== Taxonomy and naming ==
Cryptandra armata was first formally described in 1922 by Cyril Tenison White and William Douglas Francis in the Proceedings of the Royal Society of Queensland from specimens collected at Barakula. The specific epithet (armata ) means "armed".

== Distribution and habitat ==
This cryptandra grows in sandy soil over sandstone or granite from Ashford in New South Wales to Gladstone and as far inland as Morven in Queensland.
