= Grevillea 'Superb' =

Flowering plant cultivar

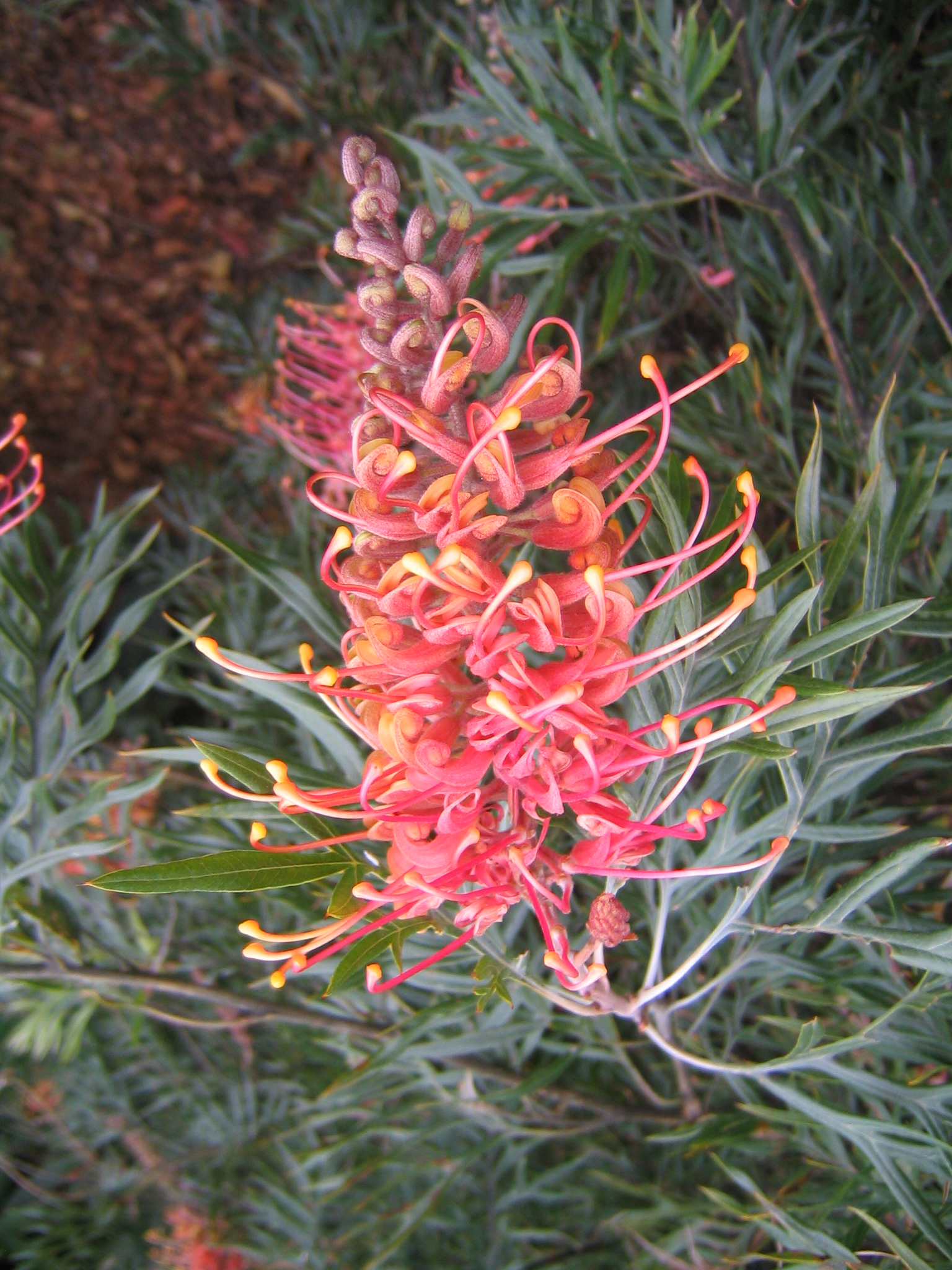
- Genus: Grevillea
- Hybrid parentage: Grevillea banksii × Grevillea bipinnatifida
- Cultivar: 'Superb'
- Origin: Bred by Merv Hodge of Moorooka, Queensland

Grevillea 'Superb' is a widely grown grevillea cultivar bred by Merv Hodge in Queensland. It is a hybrid of a white-flowered Grevillea banksii, from Queensland, and the Western Australian plant G. bipinnatifida.

== Description ==
A compact shrub growing to 1–2 metres high and wide with attractive green lobed leaves (similar to the cultivar 'Robyn Gordon'), its main horticultural feature is its flowering for 12 months of the year in warmer climates, such as Sydney and Queensland. The inflorescences are around 15 cm long by 9 cm wide and contain shades of orange, red and yellow.

== Cultivation ==
It has been very popular in Australian gardens since the 1990s, and widely planted in public spaces as well, though now there is an interest in ever smaller garden plants. The plant produces nectar and attracts both birds and bees. It likes a sunny, well drained position, will tolerate moderate frosts and grows well in a tub. Avoid using fertilisers that are high in phosphorus.

Grevilleas, including this cultivar, can be pruned by up to one third in early spring. This cultivar can be propagated fairly easily from cuttings.

== Toxicology ==
Along with a number of other grevilleas, this cultivar may cause allergic contact dermatitis for certain individuals who come into contact with it.

== In the Public Eye ==
In 2003, Australia Post issued a 50c stamp depicting the cultivar.

== See also ==
- List of Grevillea cultivars
