= Tulip fingers =

Medical condition

Tulip fingers are a cutaneous condition, a combined allergic and irritant contact dermatitis caused by contact with tulip bulbs.

== See also ==
- Textile dermatitis
- List of cutaneous conditions
