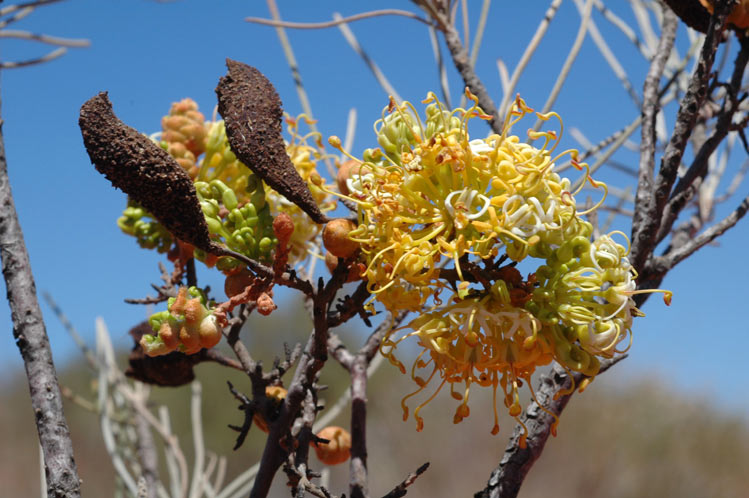
- Near Coral Bay

Conservation status
- Least Concern (IUCN 3.1)

Scientific classification
- Kingdom: Plantae
- Clade: Embryophytes
- Clade: Tracheophytes
- Clade: Angiosperms
- Clade: Eudicots
- Order: Proteales
- Family: Proteaceae
- Genus: Grevillea
- Species: G. gordoniana

Binomial name
- Grevillea gordoniana C.A.Gardner

= Grevillea gordoniana =

Species of plant endemic to Western Australia

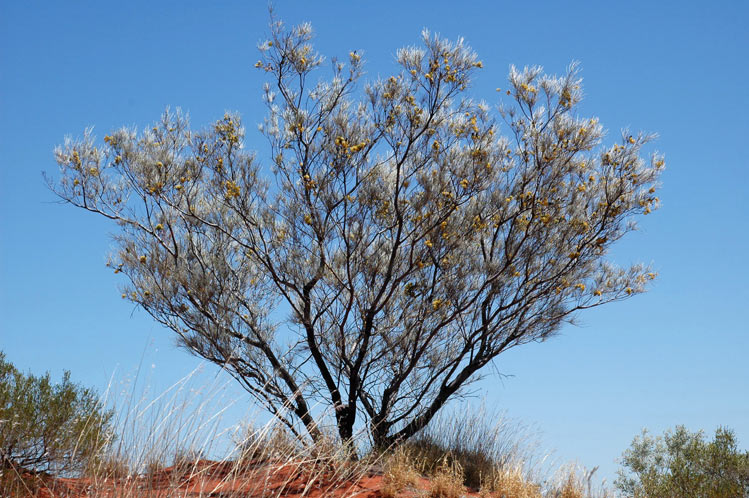
Habit

Grevillea gordoniana is a species of flowering plant in the family Proteaceae and is endemic to the west of Western Australia. It is an erect shrub or small tree with cylindrical leaves and yellow to orange flowers.

== Description ==
Grevillea gordoniana is an erect shrub or small tree that typically grows to a height of 2.5–7 m (8 ft 2 in – 23 ft 0 in) but does not form a lignotuber. Its leaves are erect, cylindrical to needle-shaped, 150–360 mm (5.9–14.2 in) long and 0.9–1.5 mm (0.035–0.059 in) wide, sometimes with two or three lobes, and silky-hairy at first. The flowers are arranged in dense, clusters, often held above the foliage, on a rachis 2–7 mm (0.079–0.276 in) long. The flowers are yellow to orange, the style turning red, the pistil 15–17 mm (0.59–0.67 in) long. Flowering mainly occurs from September to December and the fruit is an erect, pod-like follicle 23–28 mm (0.91–1.10 in) long with a rough, sticky surface.

== Taxonomy ==
Grevillea gordoniana was first formally described by Charles Austin Gardner in 1964 in the Journal of the Royal Society of Western Australia from specimens he collected near the Murchison River. The specific epithet (gordoniana) honours David Morrice Gordon of Myall Park Botanic Garden.

== Distribution and habitat ==
This grevillea grows in shrubland in near coastal areas of western Western Australia, between Exmouth Gulf and Yuna in the Avon Wheatbelt, Carnarvon, Geraldton Sandplains and Yalgoo biogeographic regions of Western Australia.

== Conservation status ==
Grevillea gordoniana is listed as least concern on the IUCN Red List of Threatened Species, as it has a relatively large distribution, a stable population and does not face any major threats, either currently or in the near future. It is also classified as not threatened by the Government of Western Australia Department of Biodiversity, Conservation and Attractions.

== See also ==
- List of Grevillea species
