= Protein contact dermatitis =

Medical condition

- Specialty: Dermatology

Protein contact dermatitis is a cutaneous condition, and was a term originally used to describe an eczematous reaction to protein-containing material in food handlers. Usually affecting the hands or forearms, it manifests clinically as a subacute or chronic dermatitis that recurs frequently over time. Niels Hjorth and Jytte Roed-Petersen coined the phrase "protein contact dermatitis" in 1976.

== Signs and symptoms ==
Protein contact dermatitis appears as urticarial or vesicular skin reaction within minutes of contact with the causative protein on previously afflicted skin; nonetheless, chronic or recurring eczema is the most frequently reported clinical picture. The most common affected areas are the hands (fingers, wrists, and forearms), although dermatitis can also occur on the face and neck (caused by airborne particles) in certain cases.

Certain foods have been linked to a few occurrences of chronic paronychia, which is accompanied by erythema and edema of the proximal nail folds.

== Causes ==
Protein contact dermatitis is typically caused by food-related, proteinaceous etiologic agents, such as cereal grains, flours, enzymes, and proteins from vegetables and animals.

== Mechanism ==
Similar to immunologic contact urticaria, the pathophysiology is a type I hypersensitivity reaction mediated by allergen-specific IgE within a previously sensitized individual. Although the precise mechanism underlying protein contact dermatitis is yet unknown, it may resemble that of atopic dermatitis, especially given that a delayed IgE-mediated reaction may be caused by IgE receptors on epidermal Langerhans cells.

== Diagnosis ==
Patch tests are typically negative, so the diagnosis is made using the results of a prick test with the allergen, which is thought to be the gold standard. Certain antibodies may occasionally be found in the patient's serum.

== Treatment ==
Usually, the eruption heals quickly when the causative material is avoided. Corticosteroid ointments or lotions expedite the healing process in extreme situations.

== See also ==
- Rubber dermatitis
- List of cutaneous conditions
