= Myall Park Botanic Garden =

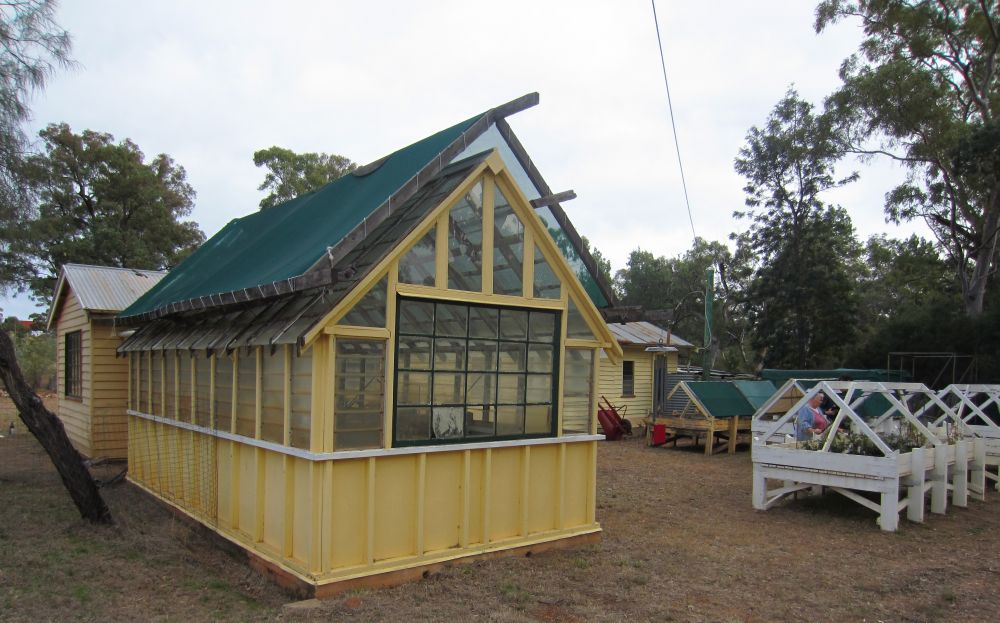
- Myall Park Botanic Garden glasshouse, 2012

- Location within Queensland Location within Australia
- 27.2057°S 149.6502°E
- Location: Myall Park Road, Glenmorgan, Western Downs Region, Queensland, Australia

History
- Design period: 1940s–1960s (post-World War II)
- Built: 1950s (nursery buildings)

Queensland Heritage Register
- Official name: Myall Park Botanic Garden
- Type: state heritage (built, landscape)
- Designated: 9 November 2012
- Reference no.: 602805
- Significant period: 1940s onwards
- Builders: Harry Howe

Myall Park Botanic Garden is a heritage-listed botanic garden at Myall Park Road, Glenmorgan, Western Downs Region, Queensland, Australia. It was founded by grazier David Morrice Gordon who made the first plantings on his Myall Park sheep station in 1941. He expanded the garden in the 1950s with the help of gardeners Len Miller and Alf Gray and nursery buildings were built by Harry Howe. It was added to the Queensland Heritage Register on 9 November 2012.

== History ==
Myall Park Botanic Garden is a large garden devoted to the growing of Australian flora. It was established in 1941 by David Gordon (1899–2001).

David (Dave) Morrice Gordon (AM) was born 9 July 1899, the fifth of nine children for James and Agnes Gordon. In 1910 the Gordon family moved to the Western Downs region from Talbot, in the Central Goldfields region of Victoria. The Gordons took up a "prickly pear selection" known as "The Lagoons" (later Lesmoir) on the Balonne River, as part of a group settlement. The rapid infestation of the prickly pear cactus, Opuntia stricta, led to abandoned properties and surrendered large pastoral leases in affected areas of Queensland. In response, the Queensland Government introduced prickly pear selections, where land either infested or partly affected was offered for lease at good terms. Group Settlement Schemes, where three or more parties selected in the same parish, were promoted as part of this process. By the beginning of 1909, 870,849 acres (352,420 ha) had been taken up as prickly pear selections, the majority being in the Dalby Land Agent's district, where the Gordons settled.

The planting of Australian flora in gardens and house settings began early in Queensland and other Australian colonies, but it was not until the latter decades of the 20th century, that their popularity became widespread and gardens devoted to Australian flora became common. From the middle of the nineteenth century, large tall trees from the Araucaria family such as the bunya and hoop pines, and fig trees were widely planted, or in some instances, retained on properties after clearing. Ferns and palms suitable for indoors or simple ferneries became increasingly popular in the late 1800s. The nationalist sentiment of the Federation era influenced a wider appreciation of Australia's flora and fauna, with native plants and animals appropriated as patriotic symbols in architecture and the decorative arts and crafts. While horticulturalists, botanists and other gardening writers increasingly advocated the use of natives in gardens, most household gardeners preferred to plant out their gardens with plants that reminded them of their largely European origins. For people who were interested, only a small number of nurseries stocked a sufficient range of Australian plants. In the early 1900s Australian flora was more likely to be seen in decorative architectural elements of domestic housing than in gardens.

Though their collections were not always extensive, one type of place where Australian flora could be found was in Queensland's botanic gardens. A network of experimental botanic gardens all initially named Queen's Park, were established throughout Queensland from the mid-1850s. Walter Hill, the first Superintendent of Brisbane's Botanic Garden (now the City Botanic Gardens), played a key guiding role, advising regional botanic gardens, lobbying governments for support and corresponding with like-minded institutions including the Melbourne Botanic Garden and the Royal Botanic Gardens in Kew, England. Sustained by annual government grants, local residents were trustees of these early gardens and professional gardeners were employed to develop them. While part of the horticultural purpose of these places was to provide public spaces of ornament and beauty for recreation and education, research and experimentation into the utilitarian qualities of plants were also major functions.

From a very early age, Dave Gordon was interested in Australian flora. Nurtured by his father's own interest, by the age of seven he was helping to collect seed and raise native trees in Talbot. At the age of 15, following the death of his father and the enlisting of his brother Jim for military service during World War I Gordon became largely responsible for running "The Lagoons". In between developing the family property for wool production and completing schooling by correspondence, Gordon further developed his interest in native plants through extensive reading, seed collecting and experimental plantings.

In late 1926 the Gordons acquired Myall Park, comprising part of the combined blocks of Cobblegun, Lower Cobblegun and Miggabaroo, that in turn were formerly part of the large Murilla consolidated pastoral run. Throughout the 1920s and 1930s, Gordon improved Myall Park and acquired more property to increase wool production capacity. In 1940 a pre-existing house on the property was relocated to a ridge just west of Myall Creek and enlarged. Single men's shearing quarters were also built nearby, which were used as temporary accommodation by the Gordon family before the house was completed.

On pastoral properties producing wool, the provision of accommodation for seasonal workers during the shearing season was a necessity. Shearers' quarters were built to varying standards all over Queensland from the 1840s. The Shearer's and Sugar Worker's Act 1905 was the first Queensland legislation to prescribe minimum standards for "proper and sufficient" seasonal worker's housing. The Workers' Accommodation Act 1915 and subsequent amendments extended these provisions. Requirements for quarters included a location away from other buildings used for pastoral purposes, suitable building materials, provision of a verandah, sleeping rooms for workers of a minimum size and height, and separate kitchen, dining room and cook's quarters.

To the south-west of the house, Gordon's long-term vision was to establish a large garden of native plants. The site did not suit grazing purposes and featured aspects desirable for growing the type of arid and semi-arid plants favoured by Gordon. Well-drained, the area was largely unaffected by humidity and frost, had access to water, and featured a range of soil types. While beauty and climatic suitability were important considerations, Gordon also consciously chose particular inland plants for conservation purposes, because of their vulnerability in their natural habitat from land clearing and grazing practices.

The prickly pear infestation was successfully controlled across Queensland by 1933 after the introduction of the cactoblastis moth in the mid-1920s. Wool production increased and prices gradually recovered following the worst years of the Depression. Transport links were improved by the extension of the branch of the Western railway line from Dalby to its terminus, the newly surveyed town of Glenmorgan, seven kilometres south-east of Myall Park in 1931. These factors meant by the beginning of the 1940s Gordon could devote more time to establishing his garden. In 1941 the first garden plantings commenced, including needlewood (Hakea leucoptera), scarlet bottlebrush (Callistemon macropunctatus) and silver cassia (Senna artemisiodes) and species of Acacias and Eucalypts.

Gordon's interest brought him into contact and correspondence with fellow native plant (and wildlife) enthusiasts from across Australia, including botanists, horticulturalists and naturalists. By the early 1940s he was providing specimens and corresponding with the Queensland Herbarium. Another early contact was George Althofer, who with his brother Peter, established Nindethana, one of Australia's earliest commercial nurseries dedicated to native flora at Dripstone, New South Wales. Gordon ordered many of his first plants and seeds from Nindethana and continued to do so over many years until Myall Park became more self-sufficient in the mid-1960s.

While a private garden, the Myall Park Botanic Garden was a serious botanic undertaking from its beginnings. The singular emphasis on collecting and growing native flora was an important step in the evolution of Queensland's botanic gardens. Myall Park was only one of a handful of larger scale gardens with a botanical focus established in the first half of the twentieth century in Queensland. Others were Laurel Park Bank in Toowoomba (1932), originally a private and later council owned garden with a large collection of exotics; Anderson Park in Townsville (1932) a council owned collection of native and exotic tropical flora (mainly trees); and Adel's Grove, Albert de Lestang's private experimental botanic garden. Located along Lawn Hill Creek in savannah country 200 kilometres (120 mi) southwest of Burketown, by 1939 de Lestang had planted over 1000 species of exotic and native plants, shrubs and trees. De Lestang corresponded with Dave Gordon and sent him Grevillea and Acacia seeds, before his garden was almost completely destroyed by fire and flooding events in the early 1950s.

The 1950s were the key decade of development for Myall Park. Gordon was able to invest more time and money in the garden because of a boom in wool value that saw prices triple between 1947 and 1951. By this time 26,000 sheep were being shorn annually and Gordon was able to leave much of the responsibility of the property's day-to-day operations with an overseer. A timber residence for the overseer and family, which Dave Gordon named Avochie, was constructed in the early 1950s, south of the single men's quarters. One hundred and twenty-eight hectares were fenced to prevent livestock from entering the garden. While much of the fenced area was cleared for growing purposes, with the managed garden taking up about 90 hectares (220 acres), some existing brigalow-belah vegetation was retained, providing a bush setting for the garden.

In 1952, Dave Gordon married Dorothy Gemmell. Born in 1930, Dorothy was raised in Glen Aplin in the Granite Belt region, and was from a family of keen naturalists. Sharing her husband's interest in Australian flora, she strongly supported the development of the garden, assisting in numerous garden-related correspondence, preparing Australian flower displays for regional shows and events and acting as a guide and host to many of Myall Park's visitors. Prior to her marriage Dorothy had studied art, and for a period was an art teacher at Fairholme School in Toowoomba. Her immersion in garden-related activities influenced the development of her art, especially the production of botanic watercolours. Her work appeared in The Bulletin, and she was commissioned by government officials to produce art as gifts. Through her involvement in art groups who often visited Myall Park, she drew local attention to the beauty of the garden.

In 1951, Gordon employed English horticulturalist Len Miller, an assisted migrant soldier who worked as a gardener for Bristol City Council, providing accommodation for him and his wife Ivy in a new timber house (given the name Terpersie) at Myall Park. Miller's first project was to plant out and record 1000 plants that Gordon had accumulated. By this time a makeshift nursery was in operation. Miller also assisted Gordon in collecting plant specimens and seeds. Initially done locally, over 1952–53 Miller travelled to New South Wales and Victoria, collecting and exchanging plants with nurseries and other enthusiasts. In 1954, Len and Ivy Miller decided to leave Myall Park. Gordon offered the Millers a contract to travel to Western Australia to places he had identified for plant collection. Between September 1954 and May 1955, the Millers collected over 700 herbarium specimens, 500 seed species and many cuttings. Collecting both cuttings and seeds meant the garden could grow plants true to their parents and raise seeds that could exhibit diversity. Complementing Gordon's existing specimens and seeds, Len Miller's collection came to comprise a substantial proportion of the Myall Park herbarium.

Alfred (Alf) Gray replaced Len Miller, working from 1954 to 1957 at Myall Park. Gordon met Gray in 1951 while visiting nurseries and native plant enthusiasts in Victoria and New South Wales. Gray, a forester, nursery manager, seed collector and propagator, was highly regarded by the time he arrived at Myall Park. As officer-in-charge at the Wail Forest Commission Nursery in Western Victoria (1946–54), Gray had pioneered arid land revegetation through provenance seed harvesting and native plant supply.

Gray's work at Myall Park focussed on seed raising, with planting and watering work in the garden the responsibility of Gordon. While Gray was working at Myall Park the infrastructure to support the functions of the garden were improved. Drawing on his prior experience, Gray designed suitable nursery structures. According to Gordon, he built for Gray the types of structures that the Victorian Government would not supply for him at Wail in Victoria. The nursery consisted of a single-storey timber building with a potting room and a seed storage room, connected by a covered entry to a timber-framed glasshouse/misting room with a concrete slab floor. The timber building was constructed first and the glasshouse was a later addition. A yard to the rear of the buildings housed four large timber hardening bays. The nursery was built by Harry Howe, with the assistance of cabinetmaker Bill Dunmall, who fitted out the vermin proof seed storage room with silky oak cabinet drawers. Cypress pine milled on the property was used in the construction of the buildings. A catalogue system was used to record seed source and date, supplier and usage. Details of propagations, planting locations and survival rates were all recorded. Around this time a large single room, lined with tall cupboards and work benches was constructed at the Gordon family residence house, to provide an art space for Dorothy and to store herbarium specimens. The house is now located within the Myall Park pastoral property, just outside the Botanic Garden boundary. The herbarium specimens formerly located in the house are now held by the Myall Park Botanic Garden.

In 1952 Gordon commissioned the damming of a section of Myall Creek, northeast of the house and garden, to increase water supplies. This was done in 1952 by Joh Bjelke-Petersen (later Premier of Queensland 1968–87), who was working at Myall Park as a contractor clearing vegetation. Over time Gordon filled the artificial lake with native waterlilies from the local area and beyond. Like the Gordon house, the lake is now located within the Myall Park pastoral property. While the garden featured plants that usually received little rainfall in their natural habitats, an irrigation system was installed to assist with acclimatisation after planting out, and to counter any long-term drought conditions. The water system used a network of water tanks on high stands connecting to galvanised piping and hundreds of above ground sprinklers. During particularly dry and hot periods, up to half of the water in the 25,000-imperial-gallon (110,000 L; 30,000 US gal) main tank would be used in a day.

Gray was also sent on collecting trips by Dave Gordon. During one three-month trip, seeds and detailed growing conditions were collected for more than 1000 species. By the time Gray left Myall Park in 1957, he (like his predecessor Len Miller) had made a major and important contribution to the development of the garden and herbarium. Many of the plants that grow in the garden derive from seeds collected by Gray and Miller. Albert Robinson replaced Alf Gray and worked for ten years in the garden, continuing propagation projects and cultivating existing plants. Bob Doney also worked in the Myall Park garden during the 1960s. Gordon's employment of nurserymen for what was, at this time, essentially a private hobby, illustrates his passion and serious investment in the garden.

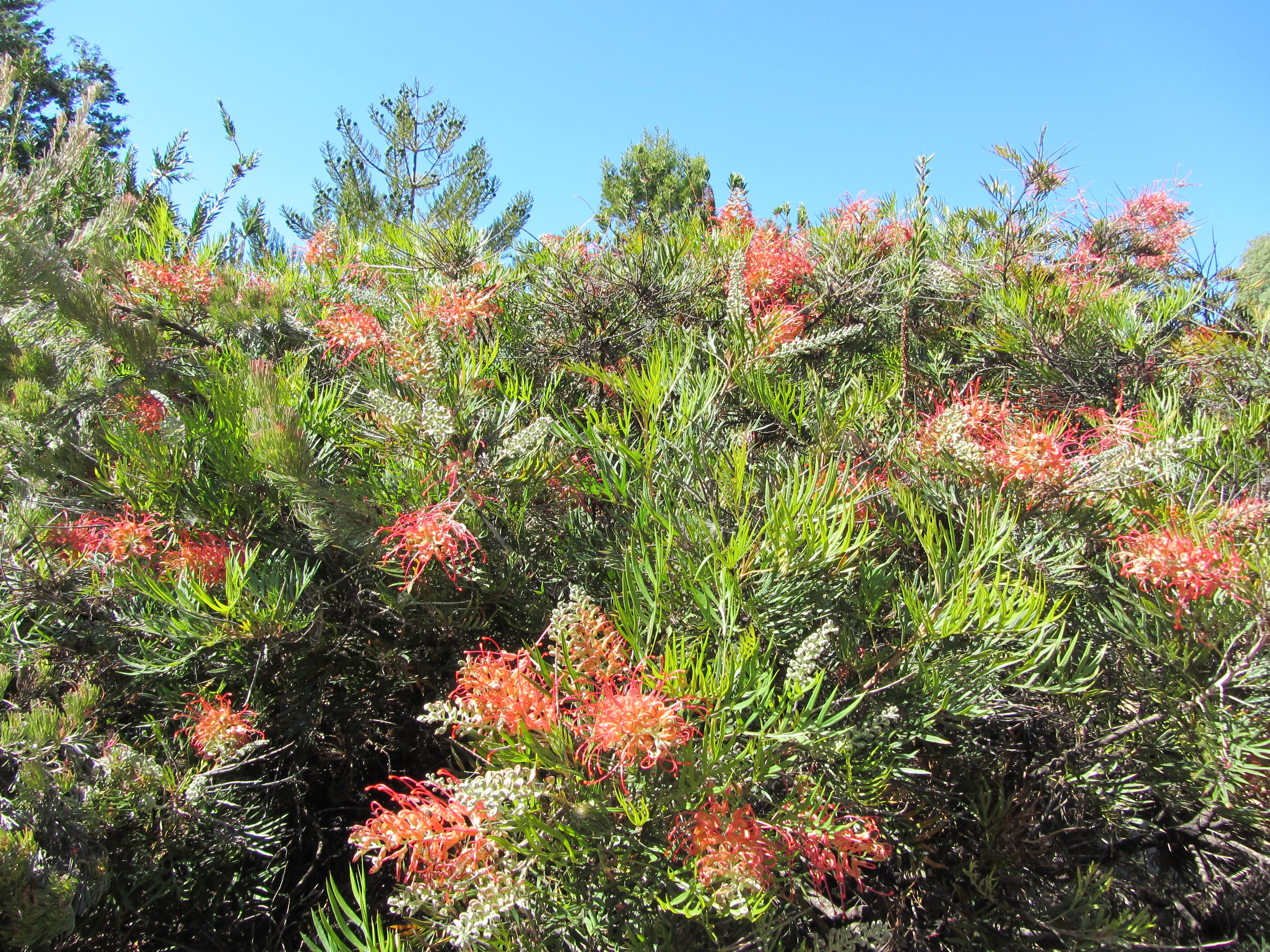
Grevillea 'Robyn Gordon'

A range of methods were used at Myall Park to provide successful raising and growing conditions, including the preparation of special growing beds, and experiments with soil structure and composition. The influence of Gordon's father was evident in the layout of the garden, through the practice of planting in clumps rather than lines. The garden was organised into divisions and Gordon methodically planted as much of a genus as was available together in the garden. Beyond aesthetic and environmental benefits, this planting method was also a way of encouraging natural hybridisation. The genus Grevillea had been a focus during plant collecting trips and in 1963 a new Grevillea hybrid appeared in the garden. Displaying the low growing characteristics of the Grevillea bipinnatifida, together with the vibrant flame coloured flowers of the G. banksii, and the ability to flower throughout the year and attract birds, the hybrid featured highly desirable attributes for gardeners. Gordon named the hybrid Grevillea 'Robyn Gordon' after his eldest daughter (who died aged 16 from illness in 1969) and distributed it freely to nurseries in Brisbane and Sydney, without payment. Three other hybrids were also produced at Myall Park. The first two were named after the Gordon's other daughters, Grevillea 'Sandra Gordon' (also a popular garden plant) and G. 'Merinda Gordon'. The third was discovered much later in the early 2000s and was named Grevillea 'Dorothy Gordon' after Dave Gordon's wife.

With its appealing characteristics and adaptability, Grevillea 'Robyn Gordon' became a very popular plant in Australian gardens. It was the first plant registered by the Australian Cultivar Registration Authority in 1973. In 1984 the journal Australian Horticulture acknowledged its impact; "Market-wise it was a winner. The public readily gave it a place in their gardens. Landscapers looked upon it as 'a gift from above' and it was planted by the tens of thousands". The Grevillea 'Robyn Gordon' is the floral emblem of the Western Downs Regional Council and in 2006 was chosen as the floral emblem for the "Year of the Outback".

The garden was well established by the early 1960s, with plantings maturing and self-sown species proliferating where space was available. The "grandiose scale" of Gordon's efforts to conserve and grow inland native plants had been acknowledged by the mid-1950s and visitors became increasingly common at Myall Park. Among the visitors were influential native plant garden advocates Jean "Correa" Galbraith, Thistle Harris and landscape designer Edna Walling. In addition to visits from specialist interest groups, naturalists, botanists and scientists from institutions like the Queensland Herbarium, experts from other disciplines also conducted research at Myall Park, including world bee authority Dr Charles Michener.

The gardening activities at Myall Park in the post-war decades occurred at a time when the use of native plants in Australian gardens, after decades of advocacy by enthusiasts, became more popular. Increased environmental awareness, availability of native plants in nurseries, architectural fashions for bushland settings for houses and garden designs reflective of natural Australian environments all contributed to this popularity. For some gardeners, this meant accommodating a few natives among a predominance of exotics. For the most fervent, only native plants were considered suitable for their gardens. The Society for Growing Australian Plants (of which David Gordon was a life member) was established in Melbourne in 1957 and rapidly grew to become a national body with state branches. Many other specialized native plant interest groups flourished throughout Australia.

The 1970s were a period of inactivity in the Myall Park garden. Dave Gordon was unable to work in the garden following the onset of severe arthritis. The decline in wool prices meant less money could be spent on the garden, and no gardeners were employed during this period. Other than occasional minor maintenance and intermittent irrigation during very dry periods, no planting or nursery work occurred. The inherent climatic resilience of the type of plants in the garden meant that although there were some losses, many survived.

In the 1980s, Dave Gordon's health improved and he was able once again to spend time in the garden. Nurseryman Reg Carter was employed to operate the nursery and propagate seed cuttings and plants. This renewed activity coincided with the increased recognition of Myall Park as a significant botanic garden in ex-situ conservation of rare and endangered plants. In 1987 Gordon was made a Member of the Order of Australia "in recognition of service to horticulture and conservation, particularly in the growing of Australian flora". A notable visitor during this period was Professor Grenville Lucas, Keeper of the Herbarium of the Royal Botanic Gardens at Kew, accompanied by staff from the Queensland Herbarium, who acknowledged the unique importance of the collection.

Dorothy Gordon's greatest love was painting the landscape in watercolours, but her most important body of work was a collection of 48 botanical watercolours of Australian flora. Following her death in a car accident in 1985, a book of this work, Australian Wildflower Paintings, with botanical notes by Dave Gordon was published in 1988, with the assistance of a Bicentennial grant and Meandarra Arts Council. In 1991 the collection was displayed in the Queensland Pavilion at the Osaka Garden Expo.

Shortly after the first Myall Park Botanic Garden Open Day in September 1988, Gordon approached friends and family to help determine the future management of the garden. The first meeting of the Myall Park Botanic Garden Committee was held in October, marking a new phase of activity. A "Friends of Myall Park Botanic Garden" association was formed in 1991 to assist with funding and to encourage volunteer work both on and offsite. In 1992, the committee became an incorporated company limited, with a board of directors. In 1994, 132 hectares (330 acres) was excised from the Myall Park pastoral property and granted to Myall Park Botanic Garden Limited, to hold the land in trust for Garden purposes. Over five decades the garden evolved from a unique private garden devoted to inland native plants, to an extensive botanic garden with important conservation values.

There is no formal accreditation of Australian botanic gardens. The organisation Botanic Gardens Australia and New Zealand Incorporated defines a botanic garden as: "...gardens open to the public which grow plants for public enjoyment, scientific, horticultural, conservation or educational purposes, and which have local, national or international roles". Between 1970 and 2009, twenty-seven botanical gardens were established or commenced throughout Queensland. While some of these gardens contain a mix of Australian and exotic species, an increasing number concentrate only on Australian flora, and display vegetation from their particular bioregion.

Following Australian Government grant funding in 1995, an art gallery designed by Brisbane architect Brian Donovan was opened, housing a permanent display of Dorothy Gordon's original botanical watercolours. Within the grounds of the park the former single men's quarters and overseer's residence (Avochie Cottage) are used for visitor accommodation.

Dave Gordon died in 2001 at the age of 102, having made an outstanding contribution to the fields of Australian flora conservation and horticulture. The Myall Park Botanic Garden Limited has been active in preserving Dave Gordon's legacy. Approximately 20 new divisions have been established under their directorship. Onsite caretakers and volunteers from across Queensland play a large role in maintaining the garden, nursery, seedbank and herbarium, and records. Research and other partnerships have been fostered with academic institutions, local government and other community groups. The park has widened its research, education and interpretation activities beyond flora to encompass broader biodiversity values. Over 200 species of birds have been sighted at Myall Park, evidence of its importance as a wildlife refuge and board members worked with naturalists to compile the book "Brigalow Birds, Birds of Myall Park Botanic Garden and Surrounding Region" in 2010. Members of the group Birds Queensland have been longstanding visitors to the garden for bird watching and recording.

Myall Park is also a popular venue for artists, photographers, local schools and other interest groups for a range of cultural activities. At the 2009 Open Day, Clocked Out (ensemble-in-residence at Queensland Conservatorium) and the Australian Voices choir collaborated on "Grevilleas of Myall Park", inspired by the flora of the park. Commissioned artworks are located throughout the garden.

== Description ==
Myall Park Botanic Garden is located approximately 7 kilometres (4.3 mi) north-west of Glenmorgan in the Western Downs region, Queensland. Within its 132.3 hectares (327 acres) property boundary is a garden landscape of Australian flora of approximately 90 hectares (220 acres). The site is mostly flat, fenced along its property boundary, and includes a cluster of small timber buildings close to its eastern boundary. The site, formerly part of a large pastoral property is largely surrounded by a rural landscape used for grazing and cropping.

Retained local brigalow-belah vegetation provides a bush setting for the botanic garden. The garden comprises thousands of ex situ Australian arid, semi-arid and dry tropical plants, mostly indigenous to other parts of Queensland and Australia. While the aesthetic of the garden is reflective of an uncultivated inland bush landscape, there is an underlying formality in the layout. The garden is organised into approximately 72 divisions, defined by timber corner pegs. Within the original divisions laid out by David Gordon, plants are grown according to their species, in some instances on raised gravel beds, and are located adjacent to other divisions within their genus. More recent divisions established in the garden generally feature plants from different genera; this occurs in response to soil and climatic variables within the garden or for a particular educational or scientific focus.

Soil types within the garden include neutral grey brigalow soil, light loams over clays, red lateritic acid gravel, and a layer of blue/grey clay. Some plantings, including some of the oldest in the eucalypt divisions, may not initially appear their age because of the growing conditions and the particular characteristics of the plants. Plants are often marked with a timber stake with identification tags that include their species and planting date.

Reflective of natural growing conditions, established plants receive minimal maintenance. Ground cover, where it exists, is generally not mown in the majority of the grounds, to foster and shelter any unassisted germination. Within the garden, plant labelling and interpretative signage is intentionally unobtrusive.

Large water tanks on tall stands are positioned within the garden. Early galvanised steel irrigation pipes are laid throughout the garden and retain sprinkler heads, although these are not in use. A dam for the garden's water purposes is situated on the north-west boundary of the property.

A looping gravel drive circulates through the site, entering from the eastern side of the property and broadly follows the edges of the garden, as laid out by David Gordon. A number of unsealed walking paths meander through different sections of the garden.

The original Grevillea 'Robyn Gordon' was located in a grevillea division close to the western edge of the garden and was amazingly long lived, only succumbing to the severe drought experienced in 2019. Together with the other Gordon hybrids, it is featured on the "Gordon Grevilleas Walk". Examples of the parent plants Grevillea bipinnatifida and G. banksii, are planted directly adjacent. Grevillea 'Sandra Gordon' and G. 'Merinda Gordon' are planted nearby, although these are not the original plants.

The gallery and toilets (1995) and the old sawmill shed (mostly reconstructed) near the entry of the park are not of cultural heritage significance although they are important components in the current day activities of the garden. A number of artworks (not of cultural heritage significance) are located throughout the garden.

Near the eastern edge of the garden, south-east of the gallery is the cluster of buildings comprising Terpersie Cottage (former nurseryman's residence), the nursery, the garage, and the single men's quarters. To the south of this group is Avochie Cottage.

Terpersie Cottage is a small low-set single-storey timber residence. It has a multi-hipped roof clad with corrugated metal sheets and a weatherboard exterior. A large brick chimney is on the eastern side and a screened porch is on the north-eastern corner. The building is highly intact, with very little alteration evident.

The nursery comprises two single-storey timber-framed buildings connected by a covered entry to form an L-shape around a fenced yard. The long wing accommodates the potting room (slab-on-ground), seed storage room -a timber lined room, and a rear laundry and toilet. The potting room is unlined and includes timber benches clad with metal sheet, timber shelving and early gardening paraphernalia. The concrete floor has spoon drains now partially filled with cement. The seed room contains built-in silky-oak cupboards with many drawers containing seeds collected over a long period of time, most labelled with plant names. Some garden related archival records are also housed in the seed room.

The other wing of the nursery accommodates the misting house, a timber framed glasshouse with a concrete slab floor. The lower part of the walls is lined internally with fibre cement sheets. Above this on the side walls are clear glass operable louvres and on the end wall is a large timber-framed pivot window surrounded by fixed clear glass. The roof is clad with overlapping sheets of rippled, fixed glass and near the ridge are clear glass operable louvres. The roof is sheltered externally by a shade cloth mounted on a metal framing. This shade cloth is a later addition, replacing the original louvred panels. The room contains raised timber benches/boxes for plants that incorporate plastic irrigation pipes with misting nozzles. The floor retains spoon drains under the plant benches. The nursery yard retains four hardening bays. These are large timber "boxes" on legs that have a sheltering frame covered in shade cloth.

At the south eastern corner of the nursery yard is a garage. This is a single-storey, slab-on-ground building with a gable roof clad with corrugated metal sheets. It comprises three bays with a fourth bay accommodated in a lean-to on the eastern side. The exterior is weatherboards and the interior is unlined. The garage contains approximately 70 plastic tubs that temporarily holds the herbarium collection of Myall Park. The collection consists of thousands of pages of pressed plant specimens mounted on paper. Individual specimens, record collecting locations and dates, and botanical information.

To the north-east of the garage is the single men's quarters, an L-shaped single-storey low-set timber building with a chamferboard exterior and a gable roof clad with corrugated metal sheets. The long wing accommodates the workers' bedrooms each with a timber built-in cupboard. The bedrooms are accessed from a long eastern verandah that is enclosed at either end for a bathroom. The short wing accommodates the cook's rooms including a kitchen with a stove recess retaining an early cast-iron stove and early built-in kitchen cupboards. At the junction of the two wings is a dining room with a servery into the kitchen and a large brick fireplace. The chimney breast has an external apron that holds a laundry copper.

To the south of this group is Avochie Cottage, a single-storey low-set timber residence with a chamferboard exterior and a multi-gabled roof clad with corrugated metal sheets. It accommodates three bedrooms, kitchen, lounge, bathroom, toilet, and a verandah on the southern side. It has two large brick chimneys; the kitchen chimney retains an early cast iron stove. This cottage and the quarters are now used as accommodation for visitors while Terpersie Cottage is home to the caretakers.

== Heritage listing ==
Myall Park Botanic Garden was listed on the Queensland Heritage Register on 9 November 2012 having satisfied the following criteria.

The place is important in demonstrating the evolution or pattern of Queensland's history.

Myall Park Botanic Garden is important in demonstrating the evolution of Queensland's private and botanic gardens. Established in 1941 by David Gordon, the garden developed from a unique private garden of native plants to an extensive botanic garden with significant conservation and horticultural values. In its earliest decades of development, the garden's scale and singular emphasis on collecting, growing and experimenting with native plants was unparalleled in Queensland. It is thought to be Queensland's oldest garden wholly devoted to Australian flora.

As the place where the hybrid Grevillea 'Robyn Gordon' first appeared, one of Australia's most popular and widely planted cultivars, the garden is closely associated with the increasing use of native plants in Australian gardens from the 1960s. The first plant registered by the Australian Cultivar Registration Authority in 1973, the parent G. 'Robyn Gordon' lived for over 50 years.

Myall Park Botanic Garden has fulfilled many of the traditional functions associated with botanical gardens since the 1940s; increasing horticultural and scientific knowledge about flora, sharing information, seed and plant stock with like-minded institutions, experts and enthusiasts, providing an attractive and educational venue for public recreation (since 1988); and in some instances, providing plant material to nurseries and the public.

The place demonstrates rare, uncommon or endangered aspects of Queensland's cultural heritage.

Myall Park Botanic Garden's important collection of garden plants, seed bank, herbarium specimens and detailed records, includes ex situ examples of Australian arid, semi-arid and dry tropical flora rare or threatened in their natural habitats in Queensland and other Australian states. The age and scope of this botanic garden is unique in the history of Queensland's gardens.

The place has potential to yield information that will contribute to an understanding of Queensland's history.

Myall Park Botanic Garden's layout, flora, infrastructure, early gardening implements and collection of seeds, herbarium specimens and detailed records have the potential to yield important information related to historical horticultural practices and the conservation and knowledge of Australian flora.

The place is important in demonstrating the principal characteristics of a particular class of cultural places.

Myall Park Botanic Garden is important in demonstrating both the principal characteristics of botanic gardens in Queensland and significant variations within this place type. The garden's collection of living plants, complemented by the seed bank, herbarium specimens and detailed records, nursery and residence are all important elements shared with other botanic gardens. Contrasting with the more formal design features commonly associated with botanic gardens, it is located within a setting of local vegetation. The layout of the garden is organized into divisional sections without hard edged borders or lawns. Minimal maintenance practices on the plants and garden beds are more reflective of natural growing conditions.

The highly intact 1950s purpose-built nursery complex - housing potting and seed storage rooms, glasshouse, hardening bays and early gardening implements, together with the garden's irrigation infrastructure – illustrate the spaces, processes and structures used to establish and maintain the garden. The residence (Terpersie) located adjacent to the nursery demonstrates the provision of accommodation for the garden's nurserymen and their families.

The single men's quarters are a good example of the type of worker's housing provided on pastoral properties following the introduction of workers accommodation legislation in Queensland in the early twentieth century. Highly intact, its principal characteristics include the building's location away from other buildings used for pastoral purposes, provision of a verandah and separate sleeping rooms for workers, kitchen and cook's quarters, and dining and bath rooms. This building was provided for on-property workers, as distinct from the shearers' quarters located adjacent to the shearing shed several kilometres from the homestead and garden.

The place is important because of its aesthetic significance.

Myall Park Botanic Garden is important for its aesthetic significance, exhibiting picturesque qualities. It has distinct integrity as a cultivated landscape of only Australian native plants. It is a living place, constantly evolving, supporting a diversity of flora and fauna, and varying with the seasons. As such, it offers a changing mix of evocative and complex experiences that delight all the senses.

The importance of the aesthetic experience of Myall Park Botanic Garden has been demonstrated over many years in its popularity as a tourist destination and its inspiration for artists, writers, photographers, and musicians.

The place is important in demonstrating a high degree of creative or technical achievement at a particular period.

The successful creation of the hybrid Grevillea 'Robyn Gordon', encouraged through a deliberate planting process, was an important technical achievement in the field of Australian floral horticulture in the 1960s. The first plant registered by the Australian Cultivar Registration Authority in 1973, it is now one of Australia's most popular and widely planted native plants. The parent G. 'Robyn Gordon' flourished in the garden until the drought of 2019.

The place has a strong or special association with a particular community or cultural group for social, cultural or spiritual reasons.

Myall Park Botanic Garden has a special and longstanding association with gardening and Australian flora and fauna enthusiasts and experts. The garden's horticultural and conservation values have been recognised and appreciated since the 1950s. The garden has been a site of inspiration, education and research for naturalists, botanists and scientists and a range of specialist interest groups including the Society for Growing Australian Plants, the Australian Garden History Society and Birds Queensland.

Through their involvement as custodians, volunteers and supporters, the Myall Park Botanic Garden Limited, the Friends of Myall Park Botanic Garden, and the regional community have strong associations with the garden.

The place has a special association with the life or work of a particular person, group or organisation of importance in Queensland's history.

Myall Park Botanic Garden has a special association with David and Dorothy Gordon. David Gordon AM (1899–2001) established the garden and was responsible its development for over 50 years. His wife Dorothy Gordon (1930–85) assisted David Gordon in the development of the garden for over 30 years, and promoted Australian flora through her botanical art. The Gordons played an important role in fostering the appreciation of Australian flora for horticulture and conservation in Queensland and the nation.
