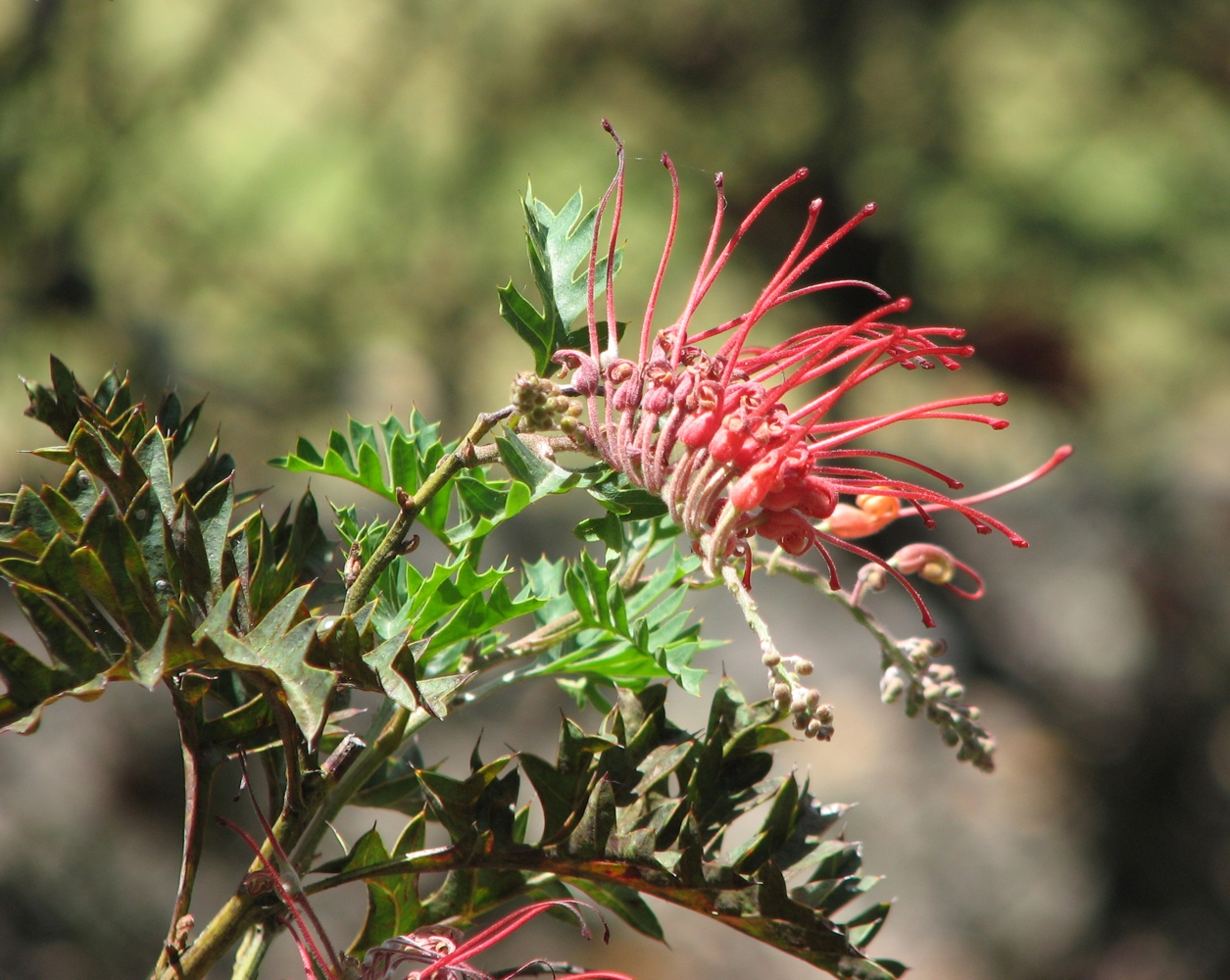
- Grevillea bipinnatifida in Maranoa Gardens

Conservation status
- Least Concern (IUCN 3.1)

Scientific classification
- Kingdom: Plantae
- Clade: Embryophytes
- Clade: Tracheophytes
- Clade: Spermatophytes
- Clade: Angiosperms
- Clade: Eudicots
- Order: Proteales
- Family: Proteaceae
- Genus: Grevillea
- Species: G. bipinnatifida

Binomial name
- Grevillea bipinnatifida R.Br.

Synonyms
- Grevillea bipinnatifida var. glabrata Meisn.; Grevillea bipinnatifida var. vulgaris Meisn.

= Grevillea bipinnatifida =

Fuchsia grevillea

Species of shrub endemic to Western Australia

Grevillea bipinnatifida, commonly known as fuchsia grevillea, is a species of flowering plant in the family Proteaceae and is endemic to the south-west of Western Australia. It is a spreading shrub, usually with bipinnatifid leaves and loose clusters of dull pink to crimson flowers.

== Description ==
Grevillea bipinnatifida is a spreading shrub that typically grows to a height of 0.25–1.0 m (9.8 in – 3 ft 3.4 in). Its leaves are usually bipinnatifid, 40–150 mm (1.6–5.9 in) long with six to eighteen lobes, the end lobes usually triangular, 3–20 mm (0.12–0.79 in) long and 5–10 mm (0.20–0.39 in) wide and sharply pointed. The flowers are arranged along a rachis 400–200 mm (15.7–7.9 in) long and are dull pink to crimson, sometimes pale green or pale orange and the pistil is 34–42 mm (1.3–1.7 in) long. Flowering mainly occurs from June to December and the fruit is a woolly-hairy follicle 17–21 mm (0.67–0.83 in) long.

== Taxonomy ==
Grevillea bipinnatifida was first formally described in 1830 by Robert Brown in Supplementum primum prodromi florae Novae Hollandiae from specimens collected by Charles Fraser near the Swan River in 1827. The specific epithet (bipinnatifida) means "bipinnatifid", referring to the leaves that are pinnatifid, the parts themselves pinnatifid.

In 2004, Raymond Cranfield described two subspecies in the journal Nuytsia, and the names are accepted by the Australian Plant Census:

- Grevillea bipinnatifida R.Br. subsp. bipinnatifida has primary leaf lobes 5–7 mm (0.20–0.28 in) wide;
- Grevillea bipinnatifida subsp. pagna Cranfield has primary leaf lobes 1–3 mm (0.039–0.118 in) wide.

== Distribution and habitat ==
Fuchsia grevillea grows in heath, open forest and woodland between Mogumber and Collie, mainly on the Darling Range in the Avon Wheatbelt, Jarrah Forest and Swan Coastal Plain biogeographic regions of south-western Western Australia. Subspecies pagna is only known from near Waroona where it grows in shrubland.

== Conservation status ==
Grevillea bipinnatifida is currently listed as least concern on the IUCN Red List of Threatened Species due to its wide distribution, a presumed stable population and no known threats, either current or in the near future. The species seems to be unaffected by dieback disease caused by the plant pathogen Phytophthora, as it occurs in many areas which are badly impacted by it.

== Cultivars ==
Hybrid cultivars have been produced which have Grevillea bipinnatifida as a parent species. These include hybrids with Grevillea banksii such as:

- G.'Coconut Ice'
- G. 'Claire Dee'
- G. 'Peaches and Cream'
- G. 'Robyn Gordon'
- G. 'Superb'

Other hybrids include:

- G. 'Molly' (a cross with G. aurea)
- G. 'Sunrise' (a cross with G. 'Clearview Robin')
