= Grevillea 'Robyn Gordon' =

Flowering plant cultivar

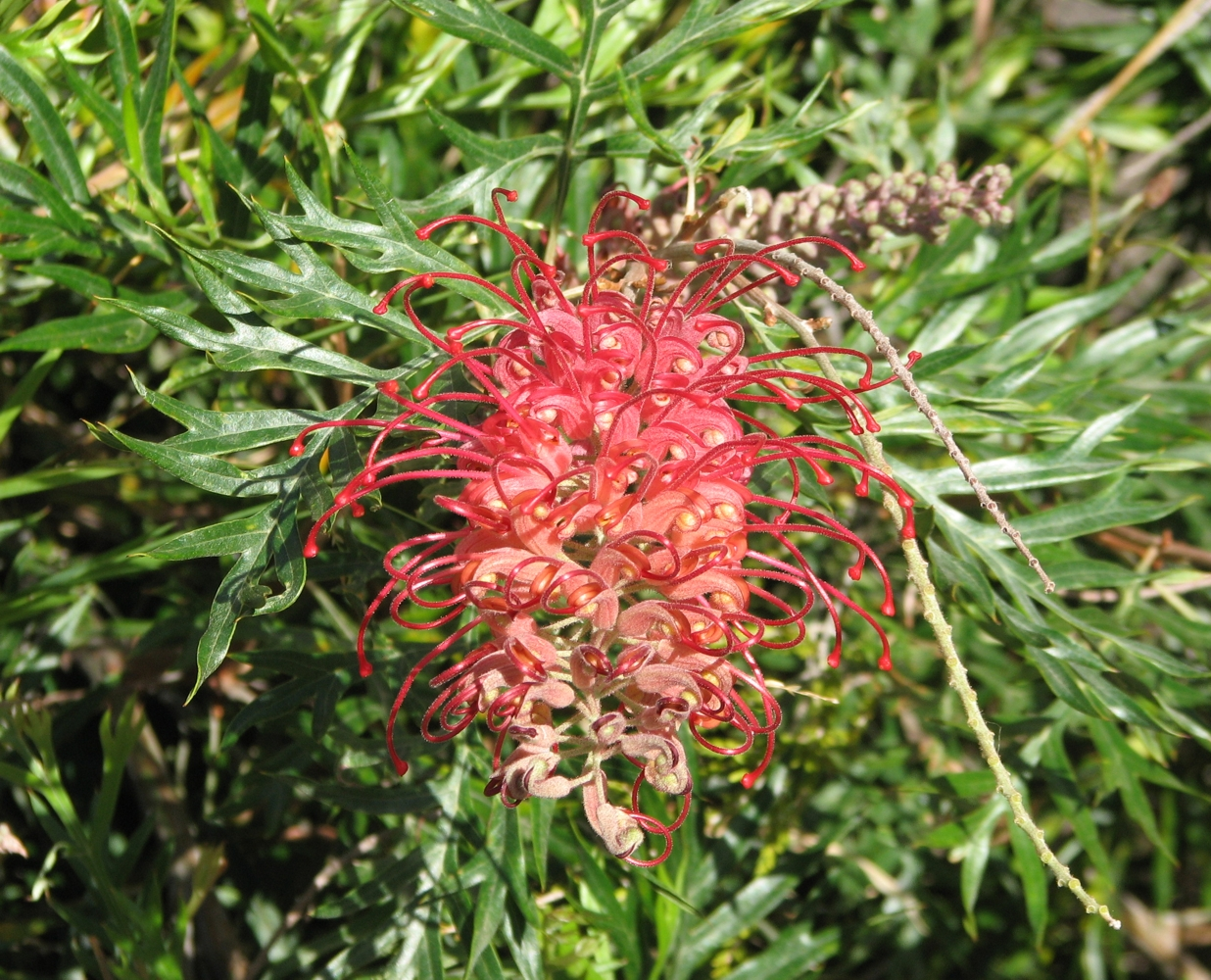
- Hybrid parentage: Grevillea banksii × Grevillea bipinnatifida
- Cultivar: 'Robyn Gordon'
- Origin: Selected by David Gordon at "Myall Park", Glenmorgan, Queensland

Grevillea 'Robyn Gordon' is a grevillea cultivar which has been planted widely in Australia and other countries.

== Description ==
It is a shrub that grows to two metres high and three metres wide, with divided leaves. The deep red inflorescences are about 15 cm long by 9 cm wide and attract honeyeaters, especially the Noisy miner which is responsible for aggressively excluding smaller bird species from urban environments.

== Origins ==
The cultivar was a chance cross between a red-flowered form of Grevillea banksii and G. bipinnatifida, selected by the late plant collector David Gordon, late of Myall Park Botanic Garden, Queensland, for its prolific and sustained flowering. Trials, which began in 1963, demonstrated stability in its characteristics and it was released to the nursery trade in 1968. It was registered in 1973 under the name 'Robyn Gordon' in memory of his daughter who died in 1969, aged 16.

There are separate hybrids of Grevillea 'Sandra Gordon', G. 'Merinda Gordon', and G. 'Dorothy Gordon'.

== Allergies ==
Along with a number of other grevilleas in the Robyn Gordon group of cultivars, it may cause allergic contact dermatitis for certain sensitive individuals who come into contact with it.

== See also ==
- List of Grevillea cultivars
