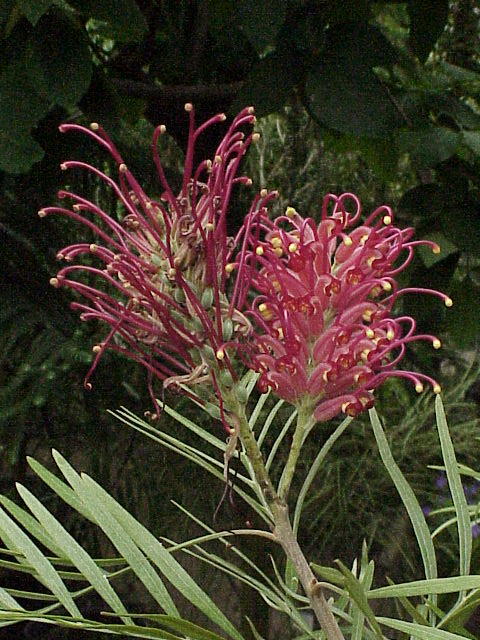

Conservation status
- Least Concern (IUCN 3.1)

Scientific classification
- Kingdom: Plantae
- Clade: Embryophytes
- Clade: Tracheophytes
- Clade: Spermatophytes
- Clade: Angiosperms
- Clade: Eudicots
- Order: Proteales
- Family: Proteaceae
- Genus: Grevillea
- Species: G. banksii

Binomial name
- Grevillea banksii R.Br.

Synonyms
- List: Grevillea bancksii Poir. orth. var.; Grevillea banksii f. albiflora (O.Deg.) O.Deg. & I.Deg.; Grevillea banksii R.Br. f. banksii; Grevillea banksii R.Br. var. banksii; Grevillea banksii var. forsteri Guilf.; Grevillea forsteri Anon.; Grevillea forsteri Hulle nom. illeg.; Grevillea forsterii Anon. orth. var.; Grevillea robusta var. forsteri L.H.Bailey; Stylurus banksii (R.Br.) O.Deg. nom. rej.; Stylurus banksii f. albiflora O.Deg. nom. rej.; Stylurus banksii (R.Br.) O.Deg. f. banksii nom. rej.

= Grevillea banksii =

Species of plant native to Queensland, Australia

Grevillea banksii, commonly known as Banks' grevillea, Byfield waratah, red flowered silky oak and dwarf silky oak, and in Hawaii as kāhili flower, is a species of flowering plant in the family Proteaceae and is endemic to Queensland. It is an erect shrub or slender tree with divided leaves with four to twelve narrow lobes, and creamy white to bright scarlet and yellow flowers.

== Description ==
Grevillea banksii is an erect, bushy to spindly shrub or slender tree that typically grows to a height of 2–10 m (6 ft 7 in – 32 ft 10 in). It has mostly divided leaves with four to twelve narrowly elliptic to linear lobes 50–180 mm (2.0–7.1 in) long and 5–15 mm (0.20–0.59 in) wide with the edges turned down or rolled under. The flowers are arranged in more or less cylindrical groups near the ends of branches, each flower on a pedicel 3–10 mm (0.12–0.39 in) long along a rachis 50–120 mm (2.0–4.7 in) long, and are creamy-white or bright scarlet to crimson. The pistil is 32–50 mm (1.3–2.0 in) long and usually glabrous. Flowering occurs from August to October and the fruit is a glabrous follicle 15–25 mm (0.59–0.98 in) long.

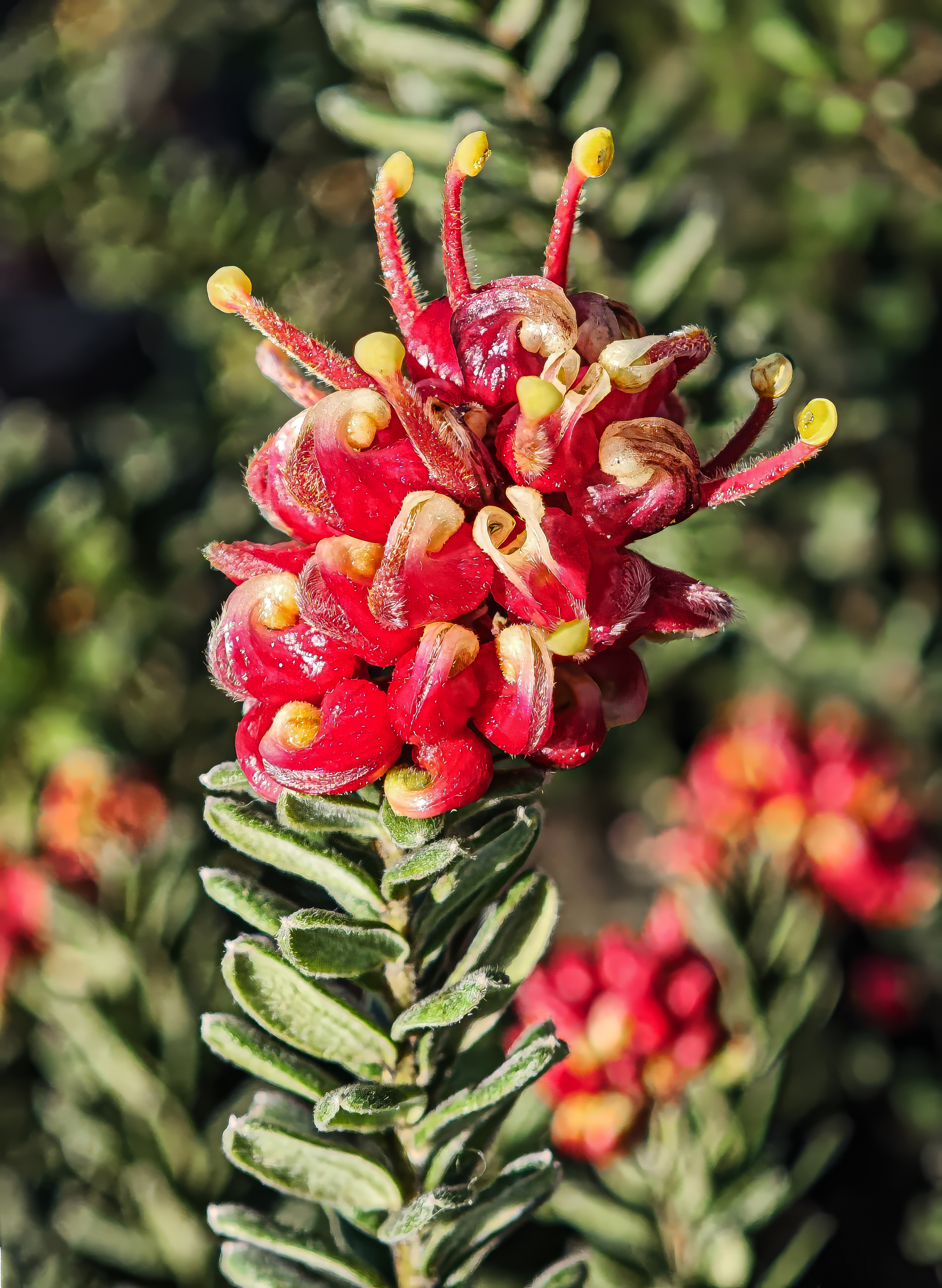
Immature inflorescence

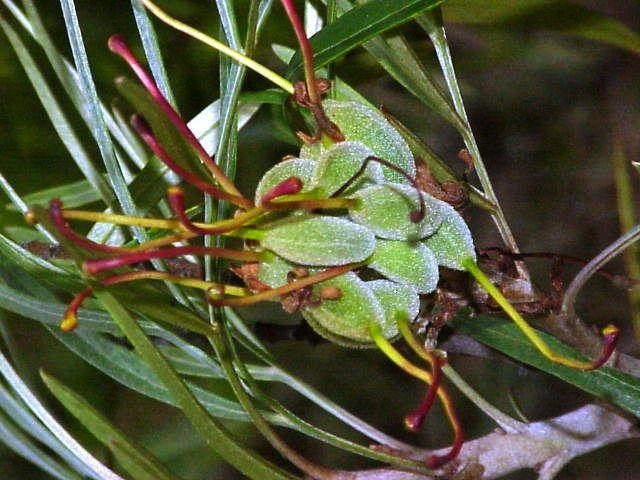
Seed pods

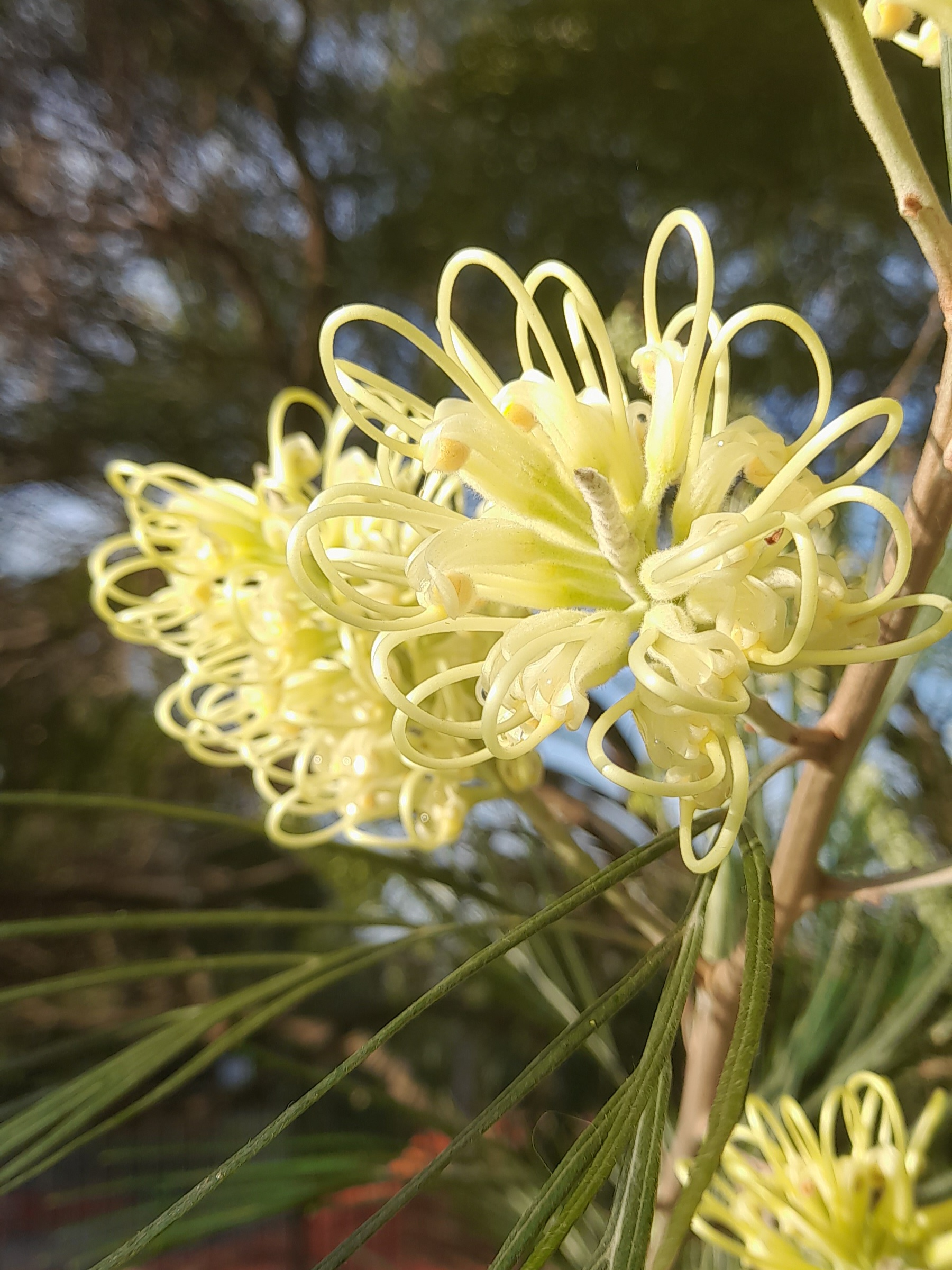
Yellow flowered form

== Taxonomy ==
Grevillea banksii was first formally described in 1810 by the botanist Robert Brown in Transactions of the Linnean Society of London. The specific epithet (banksii) honours Sir Joseph Banks.

== Distribution and habitat ==
Banks' grevillea is mostly found on the Queensland coast from Ipswich to Yeppoon, but sometimes further inland. It mostly grows in woodland and forest, usually in flatter places.

The species has also been introduced to Hawaiʻi and is an important woody weed in eastern Madagascar where it was introduced, with Acacia dealbata, for erosion control.

== Conservation status ==
Grevillea banksii has been listed as least concern on the IUCN Red List of Threatened Species. This is due to the species' extensive distribution, stable population and lack of significant current threats to the population as a whole that merit a threatened category. It is abundant within its range, however, in some sites, the population may be decreasing. Threats to this species include habitat clearing for development and agriculture and weed invasion, particularly from naturalized pasture grasses.

== Use in horticulture ==
Grevillea banksii is one of the most widely cultivated grevilleas and is a parent of hybrids including G. 'Robyn Gordon' and G. 'Superb', G. 'Moonlight', G. 'Misty Pink', G. 'Pink Surprise', and G. 'Ned Kelly'.

== Toxicity and allergic reactions ==
The flowers and seed pods contain toxic hydrogen cyanide. The alkyl resorcinols in G. banksii and Grevillea 'Robyn Gordon' are responsible for contact dermatitis.
