= Sanguiin H-6 =

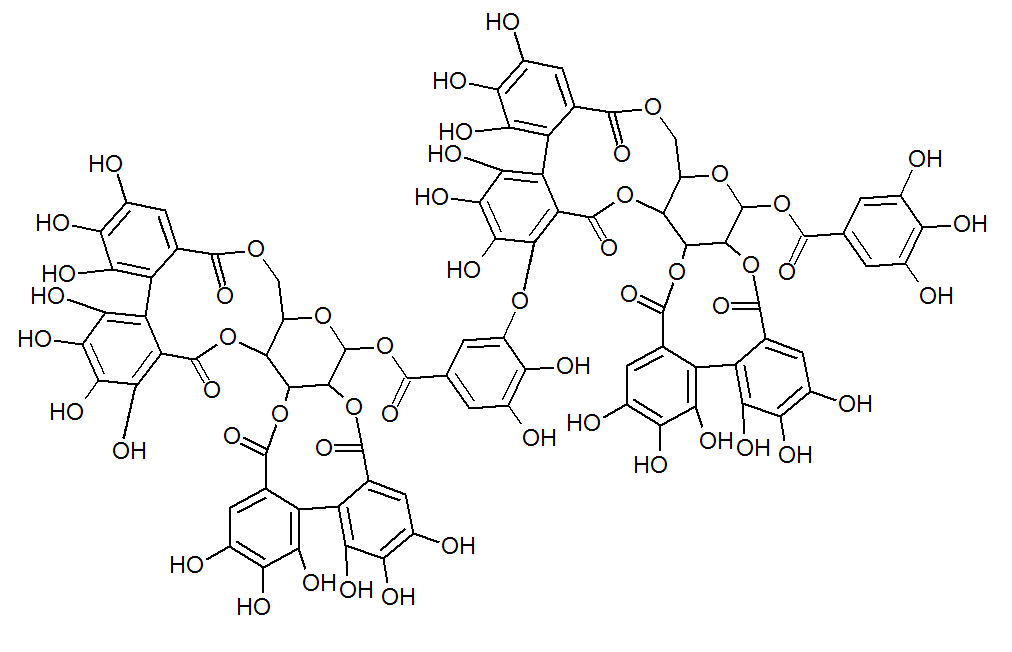
- Chemical structure of sanguiin H-6

Names
- Systematic IUPAC name (10aR,11S,12aR,25aR,25bS)-2,3,4,5,6,7,17,18,19,20,21,22-Dodecahydroxy-9,15,24,27-tetraoxo-9,10a,11,12a,13,15,24,25a,25b,27-decahydrodibenzo[g,i]dibenzo[6′,7′:8′,9′][1,4]dioxecino[2′,3′:4,5]pyrano[3,2-b][1,5]dioxacycloundecin-11-yl 3-({(10aR,11R,12aR,25aR,25bS)-2,3,4,5,6,7,17,18,19,20,21-hendecahydroxy-9,15,24,27-tetraoxo-11-[(3,4,5-trihydroxybenzoyl)oxy]-9,10a,11,12a,13,15,24,25a,25b,27-decahydrodibenzo[g,i]dibenzo[6′,7′:8′,9′][1,4]dioxecino[2′,3′:4,5]pyrano[3,2-b][1,5]dioxacycloundecin-22-yl}oxy)-4,5-dihydroxybenzoate

Identifiers
CAS Number	82978-00-5
3D model (JSmol)	Interactive image
ChEMBL	ChEMBL508647
ChemSpider	17287615
PubChem CID	16130897
- InChI: InChI=1S/C82H54O52/c83-23-1-14(2-24(84)45(23)93)71(112)133-81-70-68(130-77(118)20-9-30(90)50(98)57(105)39(20)41-22(79(120)132-70)11-32(92)52(100)59(41)107)65-35(126-81)13-123-74(115)17-6-27(87)53(101)60(108)42(17)43-44(80(121)128-65)66(63(111)62(110)61(43)109)124-33-4-15(3-25(85)46(33)94)72(113)134-82-69-67(129-76(117)19-8-29(89)49(97)56(104)38(19)40-21(78(119)131-69)10-31(91)51(99)58(40)106)64-34(125-82)12-122-73(114)16-5-26(86)47(95)54(102)36(16)37-18(75(116)127-64)7-28(88)48(96)55(37)103/h1-11,34-35,64-65,67-70,81-111H,12-13H2/t34-,35-,64-,65-,67+,68+,69-,70-,81-,82+/m1/s1 Key: FFZOOOCGCNFHAQ-GWOIDVGPSA-N
- SMILES: C1[C@@H]2[C@H]([C@H]3[C@H]([C@@H](O2)OC(=O)C4=CC(=C(C(=C4)OC5=C(C(=C(C6=C5C(=O)O[C@@H]7[C@@H](COC(=O)C8=CC(=C(C(=C86)O)O)O)O[C@@H]([C@H]9[C@H]7OC(=O)C2=CC(=C(C(=C2C2=C(C(=C(C=C2C(=O)O9)O)O)O)O)O)O)OC(=O)C2=CC(=C(C(=C2)O)O)O)O)O)O)O)O)OC(=O)C2=CC(=C(C(=C2C2=C(C(=C(C=C2C(=O)O3)O)O)O)O)O)O)OC(=O)C2=CC(=C(C(=C2C2=C(C(=C(C=C2C(=O)O1)O)O)O)O)O)O

Properties
Chemical formula	C_{82}H_{54}O_{52}
Molar mass	1871.282 g·mol^{−1}
- Except where otherwise noted, data are given for materials in their standard state (at 25 °C [77 °F], 100 kPa). Infobox references

Sanguiin H-6 is an ellagitannin.

== Natural occurrence ==
Sanguiin H-6 can be found in Rosaceae such as the great burnet (Sanguisorba officinalis), in strawberries (Fragaria × ananassa) and in Rubus species such as red raspberries (Rubus idaeus) or cloudberries (Rubus chamaemorus).

== Chemistry ==
Sanguiin H-6 is dimer of casuarictin linked by a bond between the gallic acid residue and one of the hexahydroxydiphenic acid units. It has sanguisorbic acid ester groups as linking units between glucopyranose moieties. Sanguiin H-6 contributes to the in vitro antioxidant activity of raspberries.
