= Sanguisorbic acid =

- Chemical structure of sanguisorbic acid

Names
- Preferred IUPAC name 3-(5-Carboxy-2,3-dihydroxyphenoxy)-4,4′,5,5′,6,6′-hexahydroxy[1,1′-biphenyl]-2,2′-dicarboxylic acid

Identifiers
3D model (JSmol)	Interactive image
ChemSpider	28190826
PubChem CID	71308268
CompTox Dashboard (EPA)	DTXSID801030309
- InChI: InChI=1S/C21H14O15/c22-6-1-4(19(30)31)2-8(12(6)24)36-18-11(21(34)35)10(15(27)16(28)17(18)29)9-5(20(32)33)3-7(23)13(25)14(9)26/h1-3,22-29H,(H,30,31)(H,32,33)(H,34,35) Key: IGSQOFHPQLBLHF-UHFFFAOYSA-N; InChI=1/C21H14O15/c22-6-1-4(19(30)31)2-8(12(6)24)36-18-11(21(34)35)10(15(27)16(28)17(18)29)9-5(20(32)33)3-7(23)13(25)14(9)26/h1-3,22-29H,(H,30,31)(H,32,33)(H,34,35) Key: IGSQOFHPQLBLHF-UHFFFAOYAB
- SMILES: Oc2c(c(c(Oc1cc(cc(O)c1O)C(=O)O)c(O)c2O)C(=O)O)c3c(cc(O)c(O)c3O)C(=O)O

Properties
Chemical formula	C_{21}H_{14}O_{15}
Molar mass	506.33 g/mol
- Except where otherwise noted, data are given for materials in their standard state (at 25 °C [77 °F], 100 kPa). Infobox references

Sanguisorbic acid is a constituent of some ellagitannins. It is constituted by a hexahydroxydiphenic acid unit linked by an O-C bond to a gallic acid. The differences with its isomers, valoneic acid and nonahydroxytriphenic acid, are that the hydroxyl that links the hexahydroxydiphenoyl (HHDP) group to the galloyl group belongs to the galloyl group in valoneic acid, while in nonahydroxytriphenic acid, the hexahydroxydiphenic acid unit is linked by a C-C bond to gallic acid.

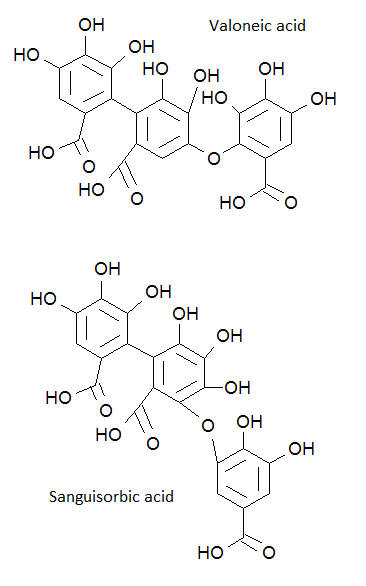
comparison of structures of valoneic and sanguisorbic acids

It is found in 2,3-O-hexahydroxydiphenoyl-4,6-O-sanguisorboyl-(α/β)-glucose, an ellagitannin found in Rubus sanctus. It is also found in lambertianin A, B, C and D, all ellagitannins found in Rubus lambertianus.

== See also ==
- Valoneic acid
