= Castalagin =

- Chemical structure of castalagin

Names
- Other names Vescalagin (treatment)

Identifiers
CAS Number	24312-00-3
3D model (JSmol)	Interactive image
ChEMBL	ChEMBL607711
ChemSpider	23340135
PubChem CID	3002104
UNII	BZ58QSX2MQ
CompTox Dashboard (EPA)	DTXSID401318501
- InChI: InChI=1S/C41H26O26/c42-8-1-5-12(24(48)21(8)45)13-6(2-9(43)22(46)25(13)49)39(60)65-34-11(4-63-37(5)58)64-38(59)7-3-10(44)23(47)26(50)14(7)15-18-16(28(52)32(56)27(15)51)17-19-20(30(54)33(57)29(17)53)31(55)35(66-41(19)62)36(34)67-40(18)61/h1-3,11,31,34-36,42-57H,4H2/t11?,31-,34?,35?,36?/m1/s1 Key: UDYKDZHZAKSYCO-LSSWMSPRSA-N
- SMILES: C1C2C(C3C4C(C5=C(C(=C(C(=C5C(=O)O4)C6=C(C(=C(C(=C6C(=O)O3)C7=C(C(=C(C=C7C(=O)O2)O)O)O)O)O)O)O)O)O)O)OC(=O)C8=CC(=C(C(=C8C9=C(C(=C(C=C9C(=O)O1)O)O)O)O)O)O

Properties
Chemical formula	C_{41}H_{26}O_{26}
Molar mass	934.63 g/mol
Appearance	off-white amorphous powder
- Except where otherwise noted, data are given for materials in their standard state (at 25 °C [77 °F], 100 kPa). verify (what is ?) Infobox references

Castalagin is an ellagitannin, a type of hydrolyzable tannin, found in oak and chestnut wood and in the stem barks of Terminalia leiocarpa and Terminalia avicennoides.

Castalagin is the diastereomer of vescalagin in C-1 of the glycosidic chain. Castalagin/ vescalagin are the most abundant ellagitannins in white wine stored in oak barrels. During aging of wines, these two compounds were progressively extracted from the wood and were transformed into new derivatives by chemical reactions. Therefore, castalagin/ vescalagin and their derivatives contribute to the color and the taste of wines and spirits stored in oak barrels.

== Sources ==
Castalagin was first isolated in Fagaceae family woody species : Quercus (oak) and Castanea (chestnut) by Walter Mayer and co-workers (1967). In some chestnut species, such as Castanea sativa, heartwood could contain 63 mg of castalagin/ vescalagin per gram of dry wood. In some wines, these two isomers represent about 40 to 70% of total ellagitannins.

Castalagin was isolated in Myrciaria dubia, the Amazonian fruit camu-camu.

== Biosynthesis ==
In some plants including oak and chestnut, the ellagitannins are formed from 1,2,3,4,6-pentagalloyl-glucose and further elaborated via oxidative dehydrogenation (tellimagrandin II and casuarictin formations). After conversion of casuarictin to pedunculagin, the pyranose ring of the glucose opens and the family of compounds including casuariin, casuarinin, castalagin, and castalin, vescalagin and vescalin forms.

Castalagin thus forms from a pentagalloyl-glucose structure. Castalagin and vescalagin (1,2,3,5-nonahydroxytriphenoyl-4,6-hexahydroxydiphenoyl-glucoses) can be further polymerized in their corresponding dimers roburin A and roburin D, and 33-carboxy-33-deoxyvescalagin.

== Derivatives ==
Castalagin and other related ellagitanins polymerizes or forms complexes with anthyocyanins and flavonoids. The flavono-ellagitannin known as acutissimin A is created when the oak tannin vescalagin interacts with catechin a flavan-3-ol found in wine. Grandinin is a castalagin glycoside which forms by binding to the pentose lyxose. Chemical hydrolysis of Castalagin/ Vescalagin produces vescalene and vescalin which are potent topoisomerase II inhibitors.
