= Dehydrohexahydroxydiphenic acid =

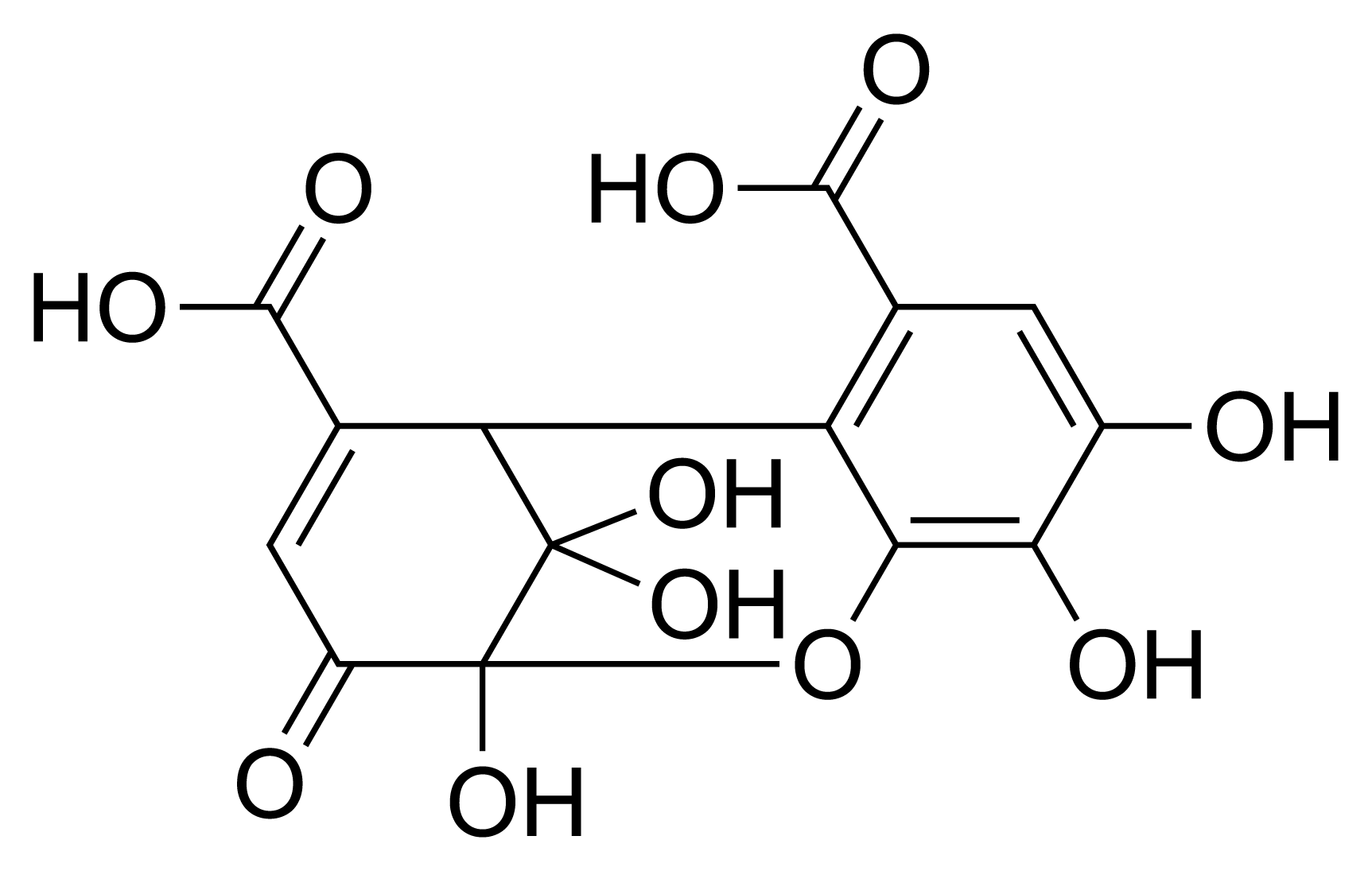

Names
- IUPAC name 5,6,9,13,13-pentahydroxy-10-oxo-8-oxatricyclo[7.3.1.02,7]trideca-2,4,6,11-tetraene-3,12-dicarboxylic acid
- Other names Dehydrohexahydroxydiphenoyl; DHHDP

Identifiers
3D model (JSmol)	Interactive image
PubChem CID	139031016
CompTox Dashboard (EPA)	DTXSID601045778
- InChI: InChI=1S/C14H10O11/c15-5-1-3(11(18)19)7-8-4(12(20)21)2-6(16)14(24,13(8,22)23)25-10(7)9(5)17/h1-2,8,15,17,22-24H,(H,18,19)(H,20,21) Key: ZMIDWLVYIBGXNC-UHFFFAOYSA-N
- SMILES: C1=C(C2C3=C(C(=C(C=C3C(=O)O)O)O)OC(C1=O)(C2(O)O)O)C(=O)O

Properties
Chemical formula	C_{14}H_{10}O_{11}
Molar mass	354.22 g/mol
- Except where otherwise noted, data are given for materials in their standard state (at 25 °C [77 °F], 100 kPa). Infobox references

Dehydrohexahydroxydiphenic acid is a group found in dehydroellagitannins. It is formed from hexahydroxydiphenic acid (HHDP) through oxidation of the plant hydrolysable tannins. It is found in ellagitannins such as euphorbin A, geraniin or mallotusinic acid.

In geraniin, it is forming an equilibrium mixture of six-membered hemi-ketal and five-membered hemi-ketal forms.
