= Urolithin A =

Chemical compound

Names
- Preferred IUPAC name 3,8-Dihydroxy-6H-dibenzo[b,d]pyran-6-one
- Other names Uro-A

Identifiers
CAS Number	1143-70-0
3D model (JSmol)	Interactive image
ChEMBL	ChEMBL1836264
ChemSpider	4589709
DrugBank	DB15464
KEGG	C22595
PubChem CID	5488186
UNII	ILJ8NEF6DT
CompTox Dashboard (EPA)	DTXSID40150694
- InChI: InChI=1S/C13H8O4/c14-7-1-3-9-10-4-2-8(15)6-12(10)17-13(16)11(9)5-7/h1-6,14-15H Key: RIUPLDUFZCXCHM-UHFFFAOYSA-N; InChI=1/C13H8O4/c14-7-1-3-9-10-4-2-8(15)6-12(10)17-13(16)11(9)5-7/h1-6,14-15H Key: RIUPLDUFZCXCHM-UHFFFAOYAT
- SMILES: Oc1ccc2c3ccc(O)cc3OC(=O)c2c1

Properties
Chemical formula	C_{13}H_{8}O_{4}
Molar mass	228.203 g·mol^{−1}
- Except where otherwise noted, data are given for materials in their standard state (at 25 °C [77 °F], 100 kPa). Infobox references

Urolithin A is a metabolite compound resulting from the transformation of ellagitannins by the gut bacteria. It belongs to the class of organic compounds known as benzo-coumarins or dibenzo-α-pyrones. Its precursors – ellagic acids and ellagitannins – are ubiquitous in nature, including edible plants, such as pomegranates, strawberries, raspberries, walnuts, and others.

Urolithin A is not known to be found in any food source. Its bioavailability mostly depends on individual microbiota composition, as only some bacteria are able to convert ellagitannins into urolithins.

== Chemistry ==
Urolithin A belongs to the class of organic compounds known as benzo-coumarins or dibenzo-α-pyrones. These are polycyclic aromatic compounds containing a 1-benzopyran moiety with a ketone group at the C2 carbon atom (1-benzopyran-2-one).

== Biochemistry and metabolism ==
Pomegranate fruits, walnuts, and raspberries are sources of ellagitannins. Ellagitannins are hydrolyzed in the gut to release ellagic acid, which is further processed by the gut microflora into urolithins through the loss of one of its two lactones and by successive removal of hydroxyl groups.

While studies have shown that Gordonibacter urolithinfaciens and Gordonibacter pamelaeae play a role in the conversion of ellagic acids and ellagitannins into urolithin A, the microorganisms responsible for the complete transformation into the final urolithins are still unknown. Multi-omics research has shown that Enterocloster species encode dehydroxylase enzymes responsible for converting urolithin C to urolithin A. The efficiency of the conversion of ellagitannins into urolithin A significantly varies in humans, and some individuals do not show any conversion.

When synthesized and absorbed in the intestines, urolithin A enters the systemic circulation where it becomes available to tissues throughout the body where it is further subjected to additional chemical transformations (including glucuronidation, methylation, sulfation, or a combination of them) within the enterocytes and hepatocytes. Urolithin A and its derivatives - urolithin A glucuronide and urolithin A sulfate being most abundant - release into the circulation, before being excreted in the urine.

== Safety ==
In vivo studies did not determine any toxicity or specific adverse effects following dietary intake of urolithin A. Safety studies in elderly humans indicated urolithin A was well tolerated. In 2018, the US Food and Drug Administration listed urolithin A as a safe ingredient for food products having content in the range of 250 mg to one gram per serving.

== Research ==
In preliminary human studies, urolithin A appears to be well-tolerated with mild side effects.

== Dietary sources ==
Urolithin A is not known to be found in any food, but rather forms as the result of transformation of ellagic acids and ellagitannins by the gut microbiota in humans. Sources of ellagitannins are pomegranates, nuts, some berries (raspberries, strawberries, blackberries), tea, muscadine grapes, many tropical fruits, and oak-aged wines.

The conversion of the ellagic acids into urolithin A depends on individual microbiota composition, and can vary significantly.

== See also ==
- Urolithins
