= Valoneic acid =

- Chemical structure of valoneic acid

Names
- Other names Valoneaic acid

Identifiers
CAS Number	517-54-4
3D model (JSmol)	Interactive image
ChemSpider	26233367
PubChem CID	12444662
UNII	G4WG3M7WNB
CompTox Dashboard (EPA)	DTXSID60498505
- InChI: InChI=1S/C21H14O13/c22-11-1-6(8(19(28)29)3-12(11)23)7-2-13(24)15(5-9(7)20(30)31)34-18-10(21(32)33)4-14(25)16(26)17(18)27/h1-5,22-27H,(H,28,29)(H,30,31)(H,32,33) Key: YIWUPYVTWJLBDH-UHFFFAOYSA-N; InChI=1/C21H14O13/c22-11-1-6(8(19(28)29)3-12(11)23)7-2-13(24)15(5-9(7)20(30)31)34-18-10(21(32)33)4-14(25)16(26)17(18)27/h1-5,22-27H,(H,28,29)(H,30,31)(H,32,33) Key: YIWUPYVTWJLBDH-UHFFFAOYAX
- SMILES: c1c(c(cc(c1O)O)C(=O)O)c2cc(c(cc2C(=O)O)Oc3c(cc(c(c3O)O)O)C(=O)O)O

Properties
Chemical formula	C_{21}H_{14}O_{13}; C_{21}H_{14}O_{15}
Molar mass	474.32 g/mol, 506.32 g/mol
- Except where otherwise noted, data are given for materials in their standard state (at 25 °C [77 °F], 100 kPa). verify (what is ?) Infobox references

Valoneic acid is a hydrolysable tannin. It is a component of some hydrolysable tannins such as mallojaponin.

The difference with its isomer sanguisorbic acid is that the hydroxyl that links the hexahydroxydiphenoyl (HHDP) group to the galloyl group belongs to the HHDP group.

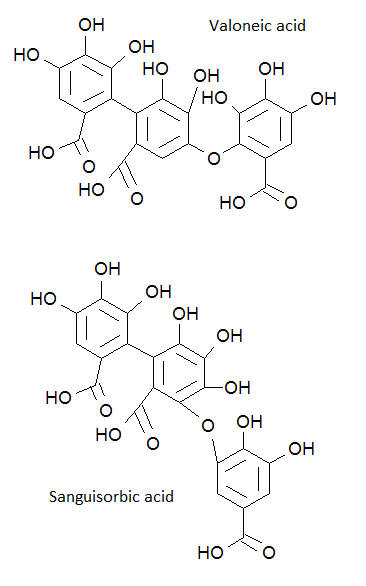
Comparison of structures of valoneic and sanguisorbic acids

It can be chemically synthesized.

== See also ==
- Sanguisorbic acid
- Valonea (Quercus macrolepis)
- Valoneic acid dilactone
