= Lambertianin C =

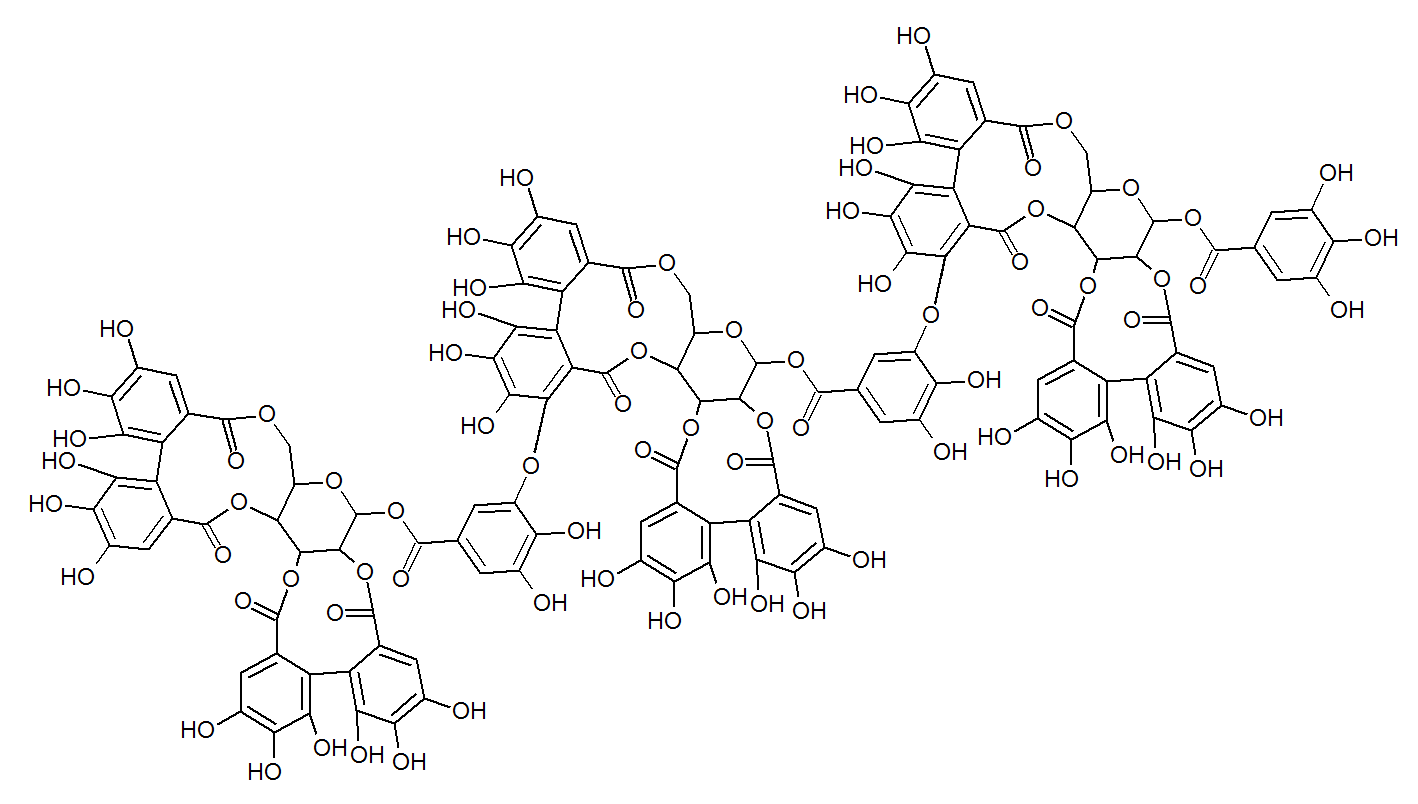
- Chemical structure of lambertianin C

Names
- Systematic IUPAC name (10aR,11S,12aR,25aR,25bS)-2,3,4,5,6,7,17,18,19,20,21,22-Dodecahydroxy-9,15,24,27-tetraoxo-9,10a,11,12a,13,15,24,25a,25b,27-decahydrodibenzo[g,i]dibenzo[6′,7′:8′,9′][1,4]dioxecino[2′,3′:4,5]pyrano[3,2-b][1,5]dioxacycloundecin-11-yl (3^{10a}R,3^{11}S,3^{12a}R,3^{25a}R,3^{25b}S,8^{10a}R,8^{11}R,8^{12a}R,8^{25a}R,8^{25b}S)-1^{5},1^{6},3^{2},3^{3},3^{4},3^{5},3^{6},3^{7},3^{17},3^{18},3^{19},3^{20},3^{21},3^{22},6^{4},6^{5},8^{2},8^{3},8^{4},8^{5},8^{6},8^{7},8^{17},8^{18},8^{19},8^{20},8^{21},8^{22},11^{3},11^{4},11^{5}-hentriacontahydroxy-3^{9},3^{15},3^{24},3^{27},5,8^{9},8^{15},8^{24},8^{27},10-decaoxo-3^{9},3^{10a},3^{11},3^{12a},3^{13},3^{15},3^{24},3^{25a},3^{25b},3^{27},8^{9},8^{10a},8^{11},8^{12a},8^{13},8^{15},8^{24},8^{25a},8^{25b},8^{27}-icosahydro-2,4,7,9-tetraoxa-3,8(22,11)-bis(dibenzo[g,i]dibenzo[6′,7′:8′,9′][1,4]dioxecino[2′,3′:4,5]pyrano[3,2-b][1,5]dioxacycloundecina)-1,11(1),6(1,3)-tribenzenaundecaphane-1^{3}-carboxylate

Identifiers
3D model (JSmol)	Interactive image
PubChem CID	101196665
- InChI: InChI=1S/C121H80O76/c122-32-1-20(2-33(123)65(32)136)106(165)195-119-103-100(189-112(171)26-10-39(129)70(141)80(151)54(26)57-29(115(174)192-103)13-42(132)73(144)83(57)154)94-49(183-119)17-178-46-16-45(135)77(148)87(158)61(46)63-89(160)91(162)93(164)99(98(63)186-94)182-48-6-22(4-35(125)67(48)138)108(167)197-121-105-102(191-114(173)28-12-41(131)72(143)82(153)56(28)59-31(117(176)194-105)15-44(134)75(146)85(59)156)96-51(185-121)19-180-110(169)24-8-37(127)76(147)86(157)60(24)62-64(118(177)188-96)97(92(163)90(161)88(62)159)181-47-5-21(3-34(124)66(47)137)107(166)196-120-104-101(190-113(172)27-11-40(130)71(142)81(152)55(27)58-30(116(175)193-104)14-43(133)74(145)84(58)155)95-50(184-120)18-179-109(168)23-7-36(126)68(139)78(149)52(23)53-25(111(170)187-95)9-38(128)69(140)79(53)150/h1-16,49-51,94-96,100-105,119-164H,17-19H2/t49-,50-,51-,94-,95-,96-,100+,101+,102+,103-,104-,105-,119-,120+,121+/m1/s1 Key: JKDVHWQRXXBOIU-JRCJVTSXSA-N
- SMILES: C1C2C(C3C(C(O2)OC(=O)C4=CC(=C(C(=C4)O)O)O)OC(=O)C5=CC(=C(C(=C5C6=C(C(=C(C=C6C(=O)O3)O)O)O)O)O)O)OC7=C(C8=C(C(=C(C=C8O1)O)O)O)C(=C(C(=C7OC9=CC(=CC(=C9O)O)C(=O)OC1C2C(C3C(O1)COC(=O)C1=CC(=C(C(=C1C1=C(C(=C(C(=C1O)O)O)OC1=CC(=CC(=C1O)O)C(=O)OC1C4C(C5C(O1)COC(=O)C1=CC(=C(C(=C1C1=C(C(=C(C=C1C(=O)O5)O)O)O)O)O)O)OC(=O)C1=CC(=C(C(=C1C1=C(C(=C(C=C1C(=O)O4)O)O)O)O)O)O)C(=O)O3)O)O)O)OC(=O)C1=CC(=C(C(=C1C1=C(C(=C(C=C1C(=O)O2)O)O)O)O)O)O)O)O)O

Properties
Chemical formula	C_{123}H_{80}O_{78}
Molar mass	2805.915 g·mol^{−1}
- Except where otherwise noted, data are given for materials in their standard state (at 25 °C [77 °F], 100 kPa). Infobox references

Lambertianin C is an ellagitannin.

== Natural occurrence ==
Lambertianin C can be found in Rubus species such as Rubus lambertianus, in cloudberries (Rubus chamaemorus) and in red raspberries (Rubus idaeus).

== Chemistry ==
Lambertianin C is trimer of casuarictin linked by sanguisorbic acid ester groups between glucopyranose moieties. It contributes to the in vitro antioxidant activity of raspberries.
