= Geraniin =

- Chemical structure of geraniin

Names
- IUPAC name (1R,7R,8S,26R,28S,29R,38R)-1,13,14,15,18,19,20,34,35,39,39-Undecahydroxy-2,5,10,23,31-pentaoxo-6,9,24,27,30,40-hexaoxaoctacyclo[34.3.1.04,38.07,26.08,29.011,16.017,22.032,37]tetraconta-3,1 1,13,15,17,19,21,32,34,36-decaen-28-yl 3,4,5-trihydroxybenzoate

Identifiers
CAS Number	60976-49-0
3D model (JSmol)	Interactive image
ChEBI	CHEBI:5328
ChEMBL	ChEMBL506069
ChemSpider	10270376
KEGG	C10230
PubChem CID	3001497
- InChI: InChI=1S/C41H28O27/c42-13-1-8(2-14(43)24(13)48)34(54)67-39-33-32-30(64-38(58)12-6-19(47)41(61)40(59,60)23(12)22-11(37(57)66-33)5-17(46)27(51)31(22)68-41)18(63-39)7-62-35(55)9-3-15(44)25(49)28(52)20(9)21-10(36(56)65-32)4-16(45)26(50)29(21)53/h1-6,18,23,30,32-33,39,42-46,48-53,59-61H,7H2/t18-,23+,30-,32+,33-,39+,41+/m1/s1 Key: JQQBXPCJFAKSPG-SVYIMCMUSA-N
- SMILES: Oc1cc(cc(O)c1O)C(=O)O[C@@H]9O[C@@H]7COC(=O)c2cc(O)c(O)c(O)c2c3c(O)c(O)c(O)cc3C(=O)O[C@@H]8[C@H]9OC(=O)c4cc(O)c(O)c5O[C@@]6(O)C(=O)/C=C(\[C@@H](c45)C6(O)O)C(=O)O[C@H]78

Properties
Chemical formula	C_{41}H_{28}O_{27}
Molar mass	952.64 g/mol
Density	2.26 g/mL
- Except where otherwise noted, data are given for materials in their standard state (at 25 °C [77 °F], 100 kPa). Infobox references

Geraniin is a dehydroellagitannin found in geraniums. It is found for instance in Geranium thunbergii, which is one of the most popular folk medicines and also an official antidiarrheic drug in Japan. It can also be found in the rind of Nephelium lappaceum (rambutan).

It mediates apoptosis by cleavage of focal adhesion kinase through up-regulation of Fas ligand expression in human melanoma cells.

Geraniin has also been shown to possess immunomodularity properties, as it inhibits tumor necrosis factor-alpha, and NF-κB in ovarian cancer cells.

Geraniin was studied for its anticancer activity and shown to target apoptosis via inactivation of PI3K/Akt/mTOR signaling pathway involving NF-κB when treated against HT-29 human colorectal adenocarcinoma cells.

It is formed with one hexahydroxydiphenic acid unit, one modified hexahydroxydiphenic acid unit (dehydrohexahydroxydiphenic acid or DHHDP) and one gallic acid unit linked to a glucose molecule. It is forming an equilibrium mixture of six-membered hemi-ketal and five-membered hemi-ketal forms.

Chebulagic acid is formed from geraniin through a glutathione-mediated conversion.
