= Carl Peter Thunberg =

Swedish naturalist (1743–1828)

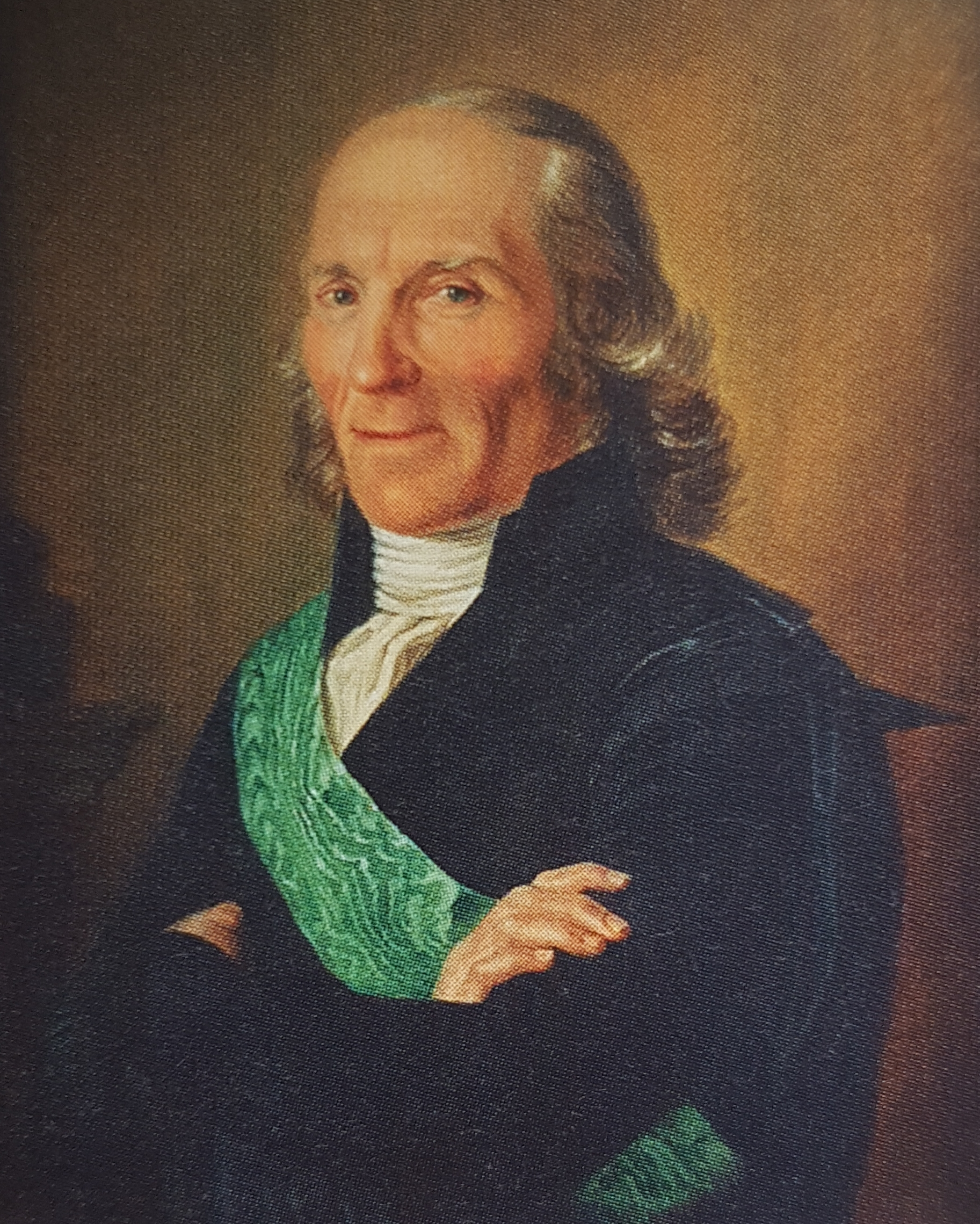
- Born: 11 November 1743; Jönköping, Sweden
- Died: 8 August 1828 (aged 84); Tunaberg, Uppland, Sweden
- Other names: Carl Pehr Thunberg; Carl Per Thunberg
- Occupation: Naturalist
- Scientific career
- Author abbrev. (botany): Thunb.
- Author abbrev. (zoology): Thunberg

Carl Peter Thunberg, also known as Karl Peter von Thunberg, Carl Pehr Thunberg, or Carl Per Thunberg (11 November 1743 – 8 August 1828), was a Swedish naturalist and an "apostle" of Carl Linnaeus. After studying under Linnaeus at Uppsala University, he spent seven years travelling in southern Africa and Asia, collecting and describing many plants and animals new to European science, and observing local cultures. He has been called "the father of South African botany", "pioneer of Occidental Medicine in Japan", and the "Japanese Linnaeus".

== Early life ==
Thunberg was born and grew up in Jönköping, Sweden. At the age of 18, he entered Uppsala University where he was taught by Carl Linnaeus, regarded as the "father of modern taxonomy". Thunberg graduated in 1767 after 6 years of studying. To deepen his knowledge in botany, medicine and natural history, he was encouraged by Linnaeus in 1770 to travel to Paris and Amsterdam. In Amsterdam and Leiden Thunberg met the Dutch botanist and physician Johannes Burman and his son Nicolaas Burman, who himself had been a disciple of Linnaeus.

Having heard of Thunberg's inquisitive mind, his skills in botany and medicine and Linnaeus' high esteem of his Swedish pupil, Johannes Burman and Laurens Theodorus Gronovius, a councillor of Leiden, convinced Thunberg to travel to either the West or the East Indies to collect plant and animal specimens for the botanic garden at Leiden, which was lacking exotic exhibits. Thunberg was eager to travel to the Cape of Good Hope and apply his knowledge.

With the help of Burman and Gronovius, Thunberg entered the Dutch East India Company (in Dutch, Vereenigde Oostindische Compagnie, or V.O.C.) as a surgeon on board the Schoonzicht. As the East Indies were under Dutch control, the only way to enter the colonies was via the V.O.C. Hence, Thunberg embarked in December 1771. In March 1772, he reached Cape Town in now South Africa.

== South Africa ==
During his three-year stay, Thunberg perfected his Dutch and studied the culture of the Khoikhoi, (known to the Dutch as "Hottentotten"), the native people of western South Africa. The Khoikhoi were the first non-European culture he encountered. Their customs and traditions elicited both his disgust and admiration. For example, he considered their custom to grease their skin with fat and dust as an obnoxious habit about which he wrote in his travelogue: "For uncleanliness, the Hottentots have the greatest love. They grease their entire body with greasy substances and above this, they put cow dung, fat or something similar." Yet, this harsh judgement is moderated by the reason he saw for this practice and so he continues that: "This stops up their pores and their skin is covered with a thick layer which protects it from heat in Summer and from cold during Winter." This attitude – to try to justify rituals he did not understand – also marked his encounters with Japanese people.

Since the main purpose for his journey was to collect specimens for the gardens in Leiden, Thunberg regularly took field trips into the interior of South Africa. Between September 1772 and January 1773, he accompanied the Dutch superintendent of the V.O.C. garden, Johan Andreas Auge. Their journey took them to the north of Saldanha Bay, east along the Breede Valley through the Langkloof as far as the Gamtoos River and returning by way of the Little Karoo. During this expedition and later, Thunberg kept in regular contact with scholars in Europe, especially the Netherlands and Sweden, but also with other members of the V.O.C. who sent him animal skins. Shortly after returning, Thunberg met Francis Masson, a Scots gardener who had come to Cape Town to collect plants for the Royal Gardens at Kew. They were drawn together by their shared interests. During one of their trips, they were joined by Robert Jacob Gordon, on leave from his regiment in the Netherlands. Together, the scientists undertook two further inland expeditions.

During his three expeditions into the interior, Thunberg collected many specimens of both flora and fauna. At the initiative of Linnaeus, he graduated at Uppsala as Doctor of Medicine in absentia while he was at the Cape in 1772. Thunberg left the Cape for Batavia on 2 March 1775. He arrived in Batavia on 18 May 1775, and left for Japan on 20 June.

== Japan ==
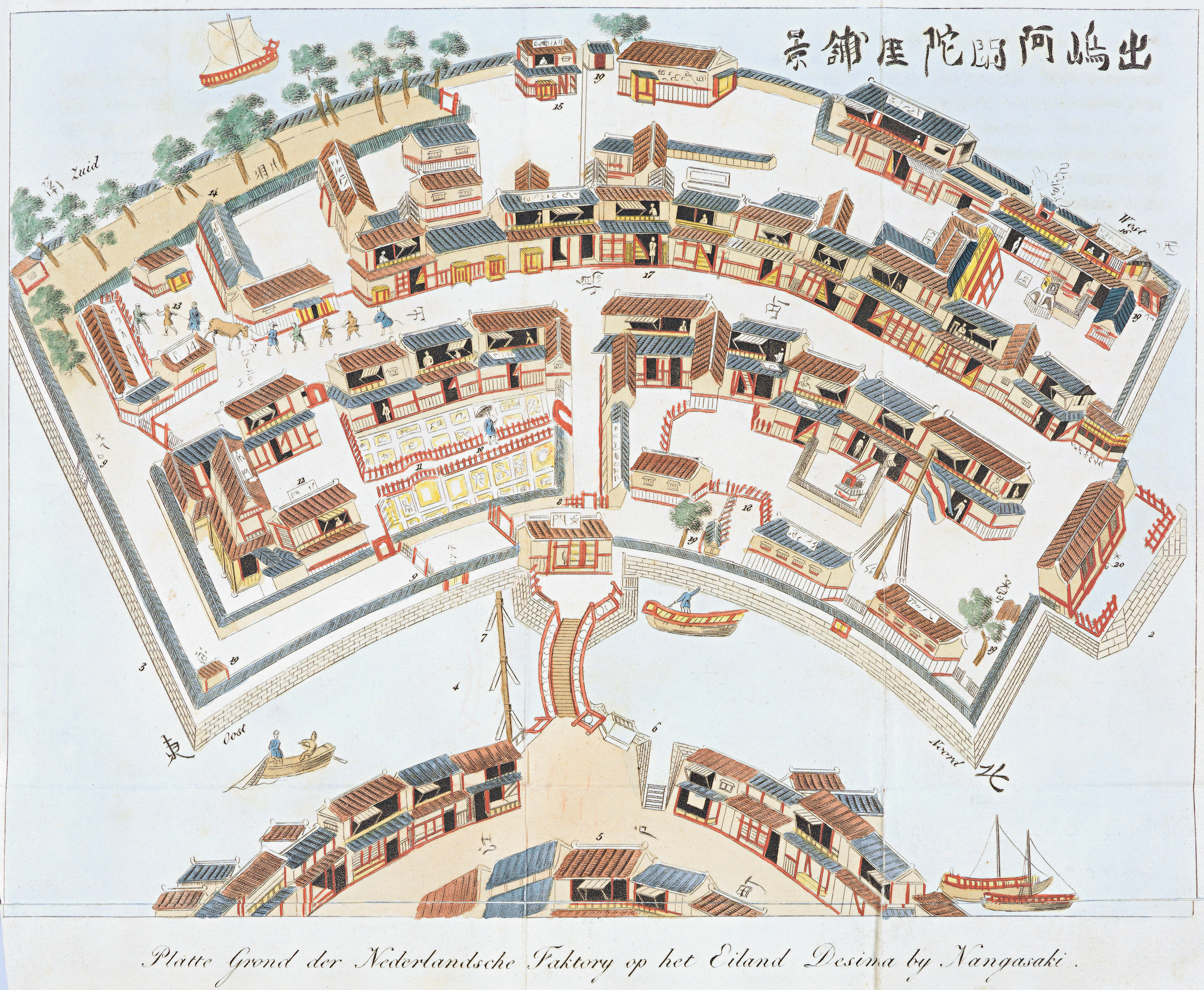
A depiction of Dejima based on a late 18th century print

In August 1775, he arrived at the Dutch factory of the V.O.C. at Dejima, a small artificial island (120 m by 75 m) in the Bay of Nagasaki connected to the city by a single small bridge. However, like the Dutch merchants, Thunberg was at first rarely allowed to leave the island. These restrictions had been imposed by the successor to the Japanese shogun Tokugawa Ieyasu in 1639 after the Portuguese, who had been the first Europeans to arrive in Japan in 1543, persisted in missionary activity. The only locals who were allowed regular contact with the Dutch were the interpreters of Nagasaki and the relevant authorities of the city.

Shortly after the Schoonzicht's arrival on Deshima, Thunberg was appointed head surgeon of the trading post. To still be able to collect specimens of Japanese plants and animals as well as to gather information on the population, Thunberg began to construct networks with the interpreters by sending them small notes containing medical knowledge and receiving botanical knowledge or rare Japanese coins in return. Quickly, the news spread that a well-educated Dutch physician was in town who seemed to be able to help the local doctors cure syphilis, known in Japan as the "Dutch disease". As a result, the appropriate authorities granted him more visits to the city and finally even allowed him one-day trips into the vicinity of Nagasaki, where Thunberg had the chance to collect specimens by himself.

During his visits in town, Thunberg began to recruit students, mainly the Nagasaki interpreters and local physicians. He taught them new medical treatments, such as using mercury to treat syphilis, and the production of new medicines. During this process, he also instructed his pupils in the Dutch language and European manners, furthering the growing interest into Dutch and European culture by the Japanese, known as rangaku. Thunberg had brought some seeds of European vegetables with him and showed the Japanese some botanical practices, expanding Japanese horticultural practices.

Thunberg also profited from his teachings himself. As a former medical student he was mainly interested in medical knowledge, and the Japanese showed him the practice of acupuncture. The exchange of ideas between Thunberg and the local physicians led to the development of a new acupuncture point called shakutaku. The discovery of shakutaku was a result of Thunberg's anatomic knowledge and the Japanese traditional medicine of neuronic moxibustion. Thunberg brought back knowledge on Japan's religion and societal structure, boosting interest into Japan, an early cultural form of Japonism.

In both countries, Thunberg's knowledge exchange led to a cultural opening-up, which also manifested itself in the spread of universities and boarding schools which taught knowledge of the other culture. For this reason, Thunberg has been called "the most important eye witness of Tokugawa Japan in the eighteenth century".

Due to his scientific reputation, Thunberg was given the opportunity in 1776 to accompany the Dutch ambassador M. Feith to the shogun's court in Edo, today's Tokyo. During that journey, he collected many specimens of plants and animals and talked to locals along the way. It is during this time that Thunberg started writing two of his scientific works, the Flora Japonica (1784) and the Fauna Japonica (1833). The latter was completed by the German traveller Philipp Franz von Siebold, who visited Japan between 1823 and 1829 and based the Fauna Japonica on Thunberg's notes which he carried with him all the time in Japan.

On his way to Edo, Thunberg also obtained many Japanese coins, which he described in detail in the fourth volume of his travelogue, Travels in Europe, Africa and Asia, performed between the Years 1770 and 1779. The coins provided new insights for European scholars into the culture, religion and history of Japan, as their possession and export by foreigners had been strictly forbidden by the shogun. This prohibition had been imposed to prevent the Empire of China and other rivals of the shogunate from copying the money and flooding the Japanese markets with forged coins.

In November 1776, after Thunberg had returned from the shogun's court, he left for Java, now part of Indonesia. From there, he travelled to Ceylon (now Sri Lanka) in July 1777. Here again, his major interest lay in collecting plants and other specimens.

In February 1778, Thunberg left Ceylon to return to Europe.

== Return to Europe ==
In 1778, Thunberg left Ceylon for Amsterdam, with a two week stay at the Cape. He finally arrived at Amsterdam in October 1778. He made a short trip to London where he met Joseph Banks. He saw there the Japanese collection from the 1680s of the German naturalist Engelbert Kaempfer (1651–1716), who had preceded him at Dejima. He also met Forster, who showed him his collections from Cook's second voyage.

On arrival in Sweden in March 1779, he learned of the death of Linnaeus one year earlier. Thunberg was first appointed botanical demonstrator in 1777, and in 1781 professor of medicine and natural philosophy at the University of Uppsala. His publications and specimens resulted in the description of many new taxa.

He published his Flora Japonica in 1784, and in 1788 he began to publish his travels. He completed his Prodromus Plantarum in 1800, his Icones Plantarum Japonicarum in 1805, and his Flora Capensis in 1813. He published numerous memoirs in the transactions of various Swedish and international scientific societies. He was an honorary member of sixty-six scientific societies. In 1776, while still in Asia, he had been elected a member of the Royal Swedish Academy of Sciences. He was elected a member of the American Philosophical Society in 1791. In 1809 he became correspondent, and in 1823 an associate member of the Royal Institute of the Netherlands.

He died at Tunaberg near Uppsala on 8 August 1828.

== Reasons for his travels ==
It was common for Enlightenment scholars to travel throughout Europe and to more distant regions, and to write subsequent travelogues. However, Thunberg was notable in his travel destination and the popularity of his account of his travels, which was translated into German, English and French. Three main reasons for this have been proposed:

1. Besides being encouraged by Linnaeus and Gronovius to travel to Japan, the fact that, for half a century, no new information on the country had reached Europe attracted Thunberg to travel there. In 1690, Engelbert Kaempfer, a German traveller, had sailed to Japan and spent two years on the island of Deshima. Kaempfer's 1729 travelogue became a famous work on the shogunate; yet, when Thunberg came to Japan, Kaempfer's writings were already more than fifty years old. The time was right for new knowledge.
2. The Age of Enlightenment furthered a scientific hunger for new information. In the light of the increasing emphasis on using the rational human mind, many students were keen to leave the boundaries of Europe and apply their knowledge and gather new insights about less well-known regions.
3. Thunberg was a very inquisitive and intelligent man, a "person of acute mind" who sought new challenges. Hence, the journey was in Thunberg's personal interest and complied well with his character.

== Namesake plants ==
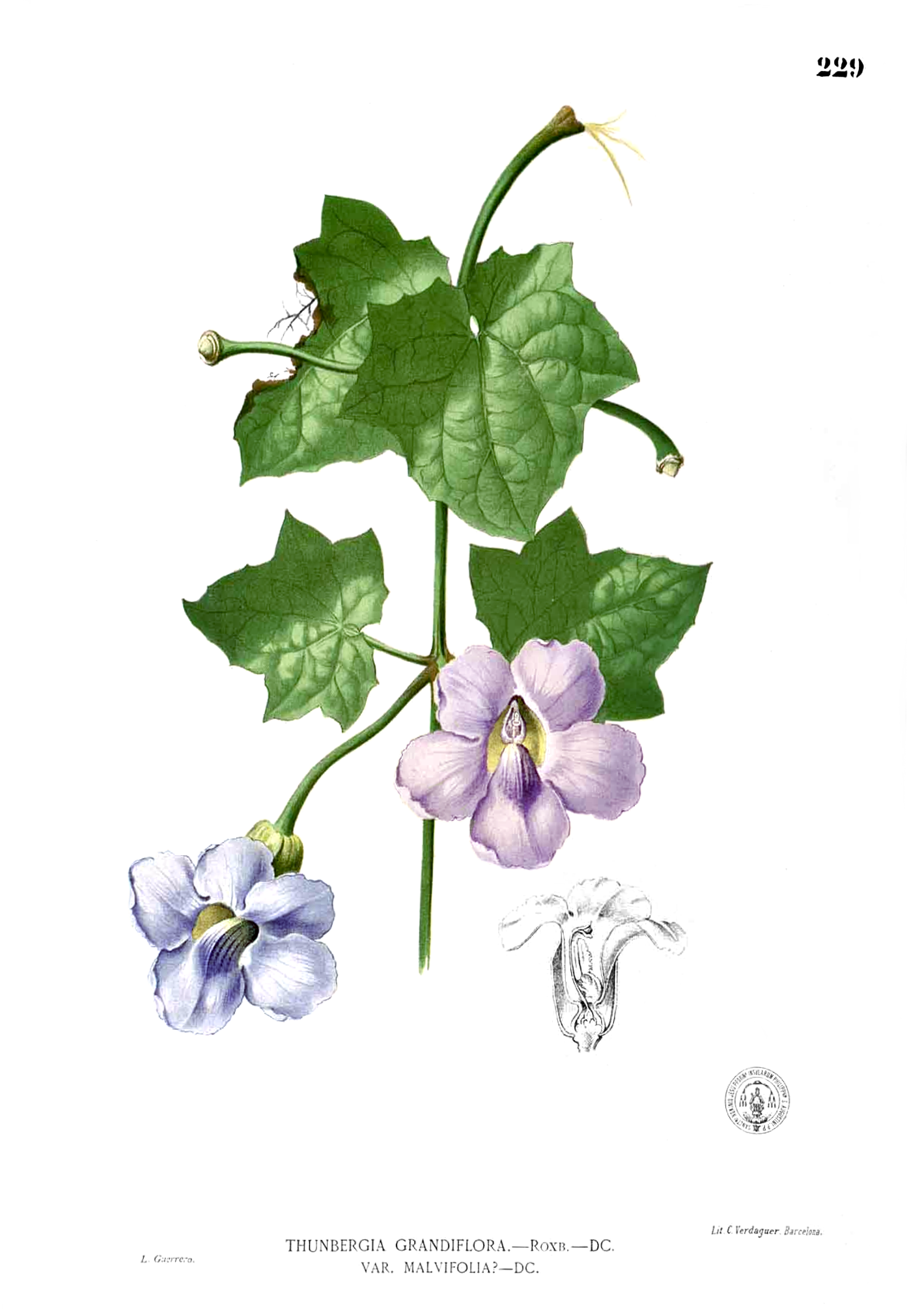
Thunbergia grandiflora

A genus of tropical plants, Thunbergia, family Acanthaceae, which are cultivated as evergreen climbers, is named after him.

Thunberg is cited in naming some 254 species of both plants and animals (though significantly more plants than animals). Notable examples of plants referencing Thunberg in their specific epithets include:

- Allium thunbergii
- Amaranthus thunbergii
- Arisaema thunbergii
- Berberis thunbergii
- Fritillaria thunbergii
- Geranium thunbergii
- Lespedeza thunbergii
- Pinus thunbergii
- Spiraea thunbergii

== Selected publications ==
Botany

- Flora Japonica (1784)
- Edo travel accompaniment.
- Prodromus Plantarum Capensium (Uppsala, vol. 1: 1794, vol. 2: 1800)
- Flora Capensis (1807, 1811, 1813, 1818, 1820, 1823)
- Voyages de C.P. Thunberg au Japon par le Cap de Bonne-Espérance, les Isles de la Sonde, etc.
- Icones plantarum japonicarum (1805)

Entomology

- Donationis Thunbergianae 1785 continuatio I. Museum naturalium Academiae Upsaliensis, pars III, 33–42 pp. (1787).
- Dissertatio Entomologica Novas Insectorum species sistens, cujus partem quintam. Publico examini subjicit Johannes Olai Noraeus, Uplandus. Upsaliae, pp. 85–106, pl. 5. (1789).
- D. D. Dissertatio entomologica sistens Insecta Suecica. Exam. Jonas Kullberg. Upsaliae, pp. 99–104 (1794).

== See also ==
- An'ei
- Kuze Hirotami
- Sakoku
- List of Westerners who visited Japan before 1868
