= Terflavin B =

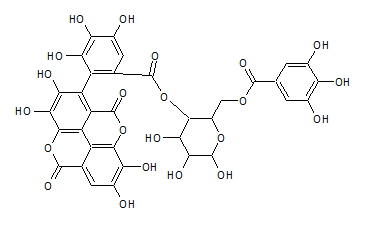
- Chemical structure of terflavin B

Identifiers
CAS Number	103744-86-1
3D model (JSmol)	Interactive image
ChEMBL	ChEMBL507965
ChemSpider	24713417
PubChem CID	44584734
CompTox Dashboard (EPA)	DTXSID00565003
- InChI: InChI=1S/C34H24O22/c35-9-1-6(2-10(36)19(9)39)30(47)52-5-13-27(25(45)26(46)34(51)53-13)54-31(48)7-3-11(37)20(40)22(42)14(7)16-18-17-15-8(32(49)55-29(17)24(44)23(16)43)4-12(38)21(41)28(15)56-33(18)50/h1-4,13,25-27,34-46,51H,5H2/t13-,25-,26-,27-,34?/m1/s1 Key: UKIPVDAOZKIZJT-RPMOVZCCSA-N
- SMILES: C1=C(C=C(C(=C1O)O)O)C(=O)OCC2C(C(C(C(O2)O)O)O)OC(=O)C3=CC(=C(C(=C3C4=C(C(=C5C6=C4C(=O)OC7=C6C(=CC(=C7O)O)C(=O)O5)O)O)O)O)O

Properties
Chemical formula	C_{34}H_{24}O_{22}
Molar mass	784.54 g/mol
- Except where otherwise noted, data are given for materials in their standard state (at 25 °C [77 °F], 100 kPa). verify (what is ?) Infobox references

Terflavin B is an ellagitannin, a type of hydrolysable tannin. It can be found in Myrobalanus chebula (Terminalia chebula), the black chebulic, and in Terminalia catappa, the Indian almond.

It is formed from a nonahydroxytriphenic acid dilactone and a gallic acid linked to glucose molecules.
