= Mallojaponin =

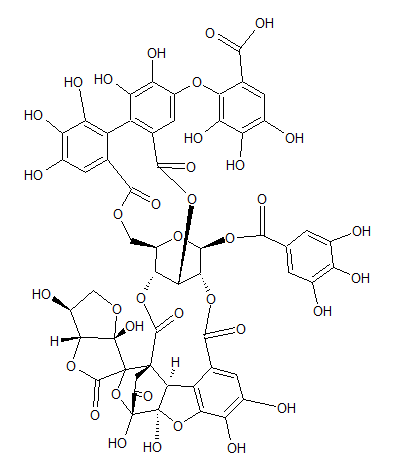

Names
- IUPAC name 3,4,5-Trihydroxy-2-({(1'R,3R,3aS,4'R,5'S,6S,6aR,23'R,25'S,26'R,35'R,36'R,37'R)-3a,6,11',12',15',16',17',31',32',36',37'-undecahydroxy-2,2',7',20',28',41'-hexaoxo-25'-[(3,4,5-trihydroxybenzoyl)oxy]-3a, 5,6,6a-tetrahydrospiro[furo[3,2-b]furan-3,39'-[3,6,21,24,27,38,42]heptaoxanonacyclo[35.2.2.1^{33,36}.0^{1,35}.0^{4,23}.0^{5,26}.0^{8,13}.0^{14,19}.0^{29,34}]dotetraconta[8,10,12,14,16,18,29,31,33]nonaen]-10' -yl}oxy)benzoic acid
- Other names 1-O-Galloyl-2,4-elaeocarpusinoyl-3,6-(R)-valoneayl-beta-D-glucose

Identifiers
3D model (JSmol)	Interactive image
ChemSpider	10276716
PubChem CID	21668994
CompTox Dashboard (EPA)	DTXSID501030300
- InChI: InChI=1S/C54H38O37/c55-15-1-10(2-16(56)27(15)62)43(72)89-47-39-38-36(87-48(76)50-7-23(61)52(78,91-51(50)49(77)88-41-20(60)8-82-54(41,51)80)53(79)40(50)26-12(45(74)86-39)4-19(59)30(65)37(26)90-53)22(84-47)9-81-44(73)11-3-17(57)28(63)32(67)24(11)25-13(46(75)85-38)6-21(31(66)33(25)68)83-35-14(42(70)71)5-18(58)29(64)34(35)69/h1-6,20,22,36,38-41,47,55-60,62-69,78-80H,7-9H2,(H,70,71)/t20-,22+,36+,38-,39+,40+,41+,47-,50-,51+,52+,53+,54-/m0/s1 Key: PMGVHTALTIBNIE-GLOQPHDASA-N
- SMILES: Oc1cc(cc(O)c1O)C(=O)O[C@@H]9O[C@@H]%13COC(=O)c2cc(O)c(O)c(O)c2c4c(O)c(O)c(Oc3c(cc(O)c(O)c3O)C(O)=O)cc4C(=O)O[C@H]%10[C@@H]%13OC(=O)[C@@]7%11CC(=O)[C@@](O)(O[C@]75C(=O)O[C@@H]6[C@@H](O)CO[C@]56O)[C@]%12(O)Oc8c(c(cc(O)c8O)C(=O)O[C@@H]9%10)[C@H]%11%12

Properties
Chemical formula	C_{54}H_{38}O_{37}
Molar mass	1278.86 g/mol
- Except where otherwise noted, data are given for materials in their standard state (at 25 °C [77 °F], 100 kPa). Infobox references

Mallojaponin is a hydrolysable tannin found in the bark of Mallotus japonicus. This compound contains the moiety elaeocarpusinic acid, an oxidized hexahydroxydiphenic acid group (dehydrohexahydroxydiphenic acid or DHHDP) which reacted with a dehydroascorbic acid molecule. It also contains a valoneic acid and a gallic acid moieties linked to a glucose molecule.
