= Ellagic acid =

Natural phenol antioxidant

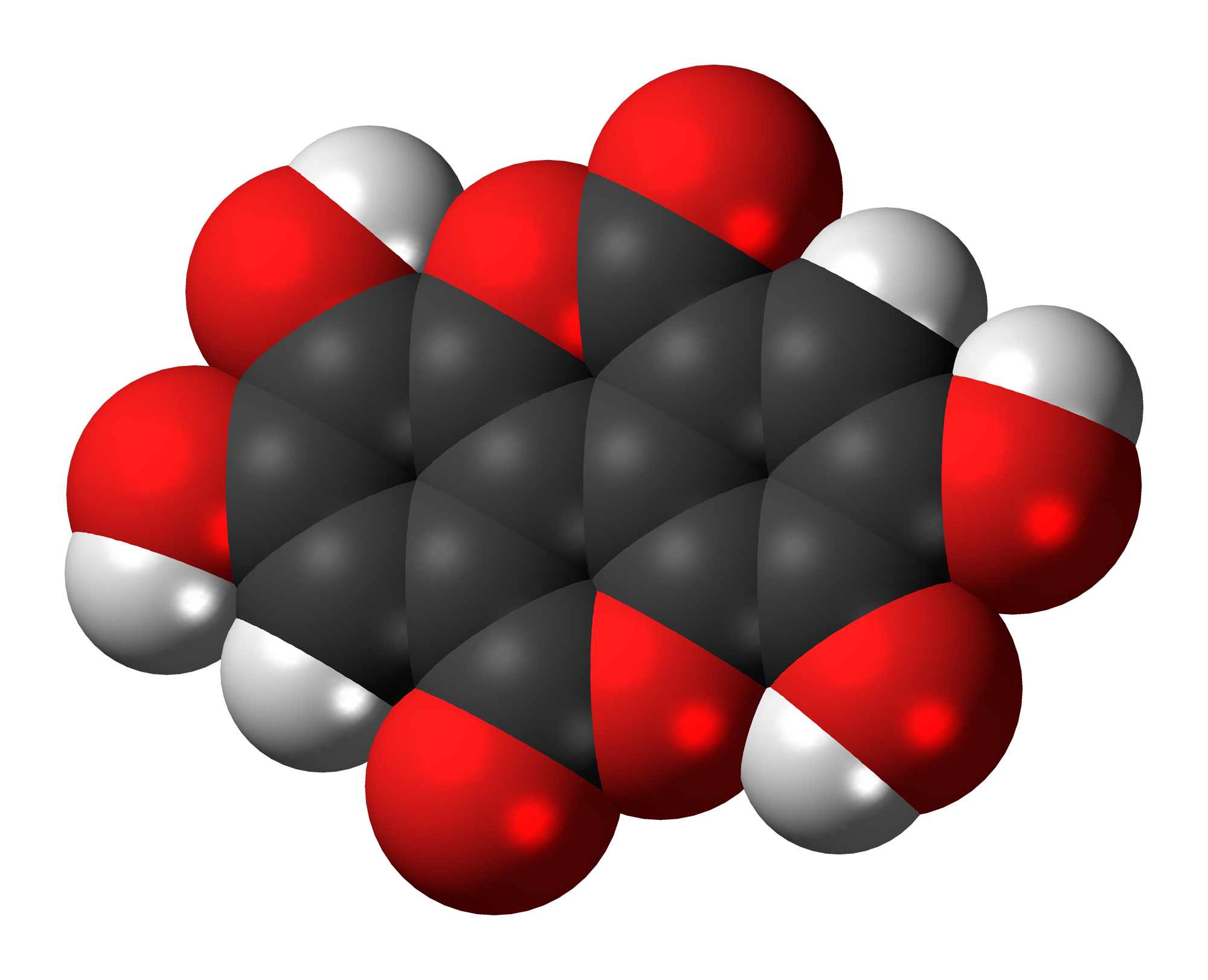

Names
- Preferred IUPAC name 2,3,7,8-Tetrahydroxy[1]benzopyrano[5,4,3-cde][1]benzopyran-5,10-dione
- Other names 4,4′,5,5′,6,6′-Hexahydroxydiphenic acid 2,6,2′,6′-dilactone

Identifiers
CAS Number	476-66-4
3D model (JSmol)	Interactive image
ChEBI	CHEBI:4775
ChEMBL	ChEMBL6246
ChemSpider	4445149
DrugBank	DB08468
ECHA InfoCard	100.006.827
KEGG	C10788
PubChem CID	5281855
UNII	19YRN3ZS9P
CompTox Dashboard (EPA)	DTXSID2020557
- InChI: InChI=1S/C14H6O8/c15-5-1-3-7-8-4(14(20)22-11(7)9(5)17)2-6(16)10(18)12(8)21-13(3)19/h1-2,15-18H Key: AFSDNFLWKVMVRB-UHFFFAOYSA-N; InChI=1/C14H6O8/c15-5-1-3-7-8-4(14(20)22-11(7)9(5)17)2-6(16)10(18)12(8)21-13(3)19/h1-2,15-18H Key: AFSDNFLWKVMVRB-UHFFFAOYAQ
- SMILES: O=C1Oc3c2c4c1cc(O)c(O)c4OC(=O)c2cc(O)c3O

Properties
Chemical formula	C_{14}H_{6}O_{8}
Molar mass	302.197 g/mol
Density	1.67 g/cm^{3}
Melting point	>360 °C
Solubility in water	insoluble but soluble in alkaline water
- Except where otherwise noted, data are given for materials in their standard state (at 25 °C [77 °F], 100 kPa). verify (what is ?) Infobox references

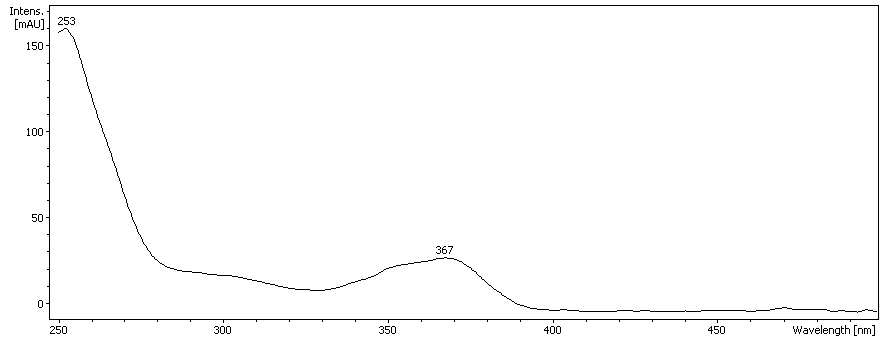
UV visible spectrum of ellagic acid

Ellagic acid is a polyphenol found in numerous fruits and vegetables. It is the dilactone of hexahydroxydiphenic acid.

== Name ==
The name comes from the French term acide ellagique, from the word galle spelled backward because it can be obtained from noix de galle (galls), and to distinguish it from acide gallique (gallic acid). The molecular structure resembles that of two gallic acid molecules being assembled "head to tail" and bound together by a C–C bond (as in biphenyl, or in diphenic acid) and two lactone links (cyclic carboxylic esters).

== Metabolism ==
=== Biosynthesis ===
Plants produce ellagic acid from hydrolysis of tannins such as ellagitannin and geraniin.

=== Biodegradation ===
Urolithins are gut flora human metabolites of dietary ellagic acid derivatives. Ellagic acid has low bioavailability, with 90% remaining unabsorbed from the intestines until metabolized by microflora to the more bioavailable urolithins.

== History ==
Ellagic acid was first discovered by chemist Henri Braconnot in 1831. Maximilian Nierenstein prepared this substance from algarobilla, dividivi, oak bark, pomegranate, myrabolams, and valonea in 1905. He also suggested its formation from galloyl-glycine by Penicillium in 1915. Julius Löwe was the first person to synthesize ellagic acid by heating gallic acid with arsenic acid or silver oxide.

== Natural occurrences ==
Ellagic acid is found in edible nuts. It is also found in oak species such as the North American white oak (Quercus alba) and European red oak (Quercus robur).

The macrophyte Myriophyllum spicatum produces ellagic acid.

Ellagic acid can be found in the medicinal mushroom Phellinus linteus.

=== In food ===
The highest levels of ellagic acid are found in raw chestnuts, walnuts, pecans, cranberries, raspberries, strawberries, and grapes, as well as distilled beverages. It is also found in peaches and pomegranates.

Dietary source	Ellagic acid
Fruits (mg/100g fresh weight)
Yellow raspberries	1900
Cloudberries	315.1
Raspberries	270
Pomegranate	269.9
Blackberries	150
Rose hip	109.6
Black raspberries	90
Strawberries	77.6
Boysenberries	70
Strawberry jam	24.5
Nuts (mg/100g fresh weight)
Walnuts	59
Pecans	33
Beverages (mg/L)
Pomegranate juice	811.1
Cognac	31–55
Oak-aged red wine	33
Whiskey	1.2
Seeds (mg/g)
Boysenberries	30
Red raspberries	8.7
Black raspberries	6.7
Mango	1.2

== Research and health claims ==
Ellagic acid has been marketed as a dietary supplement with various claimed benefits against cancer, heart disease, and other diseases. In the 21st century, numerous U.S.-based supplement companies received FDA warning letters for promoting ellagic acid with false anti-disease claims that violate the Federal Food, Drug, and Cosmetic Act. Ellagic acid has been identified by the FDA as a "fake cancer 'cure'". There is no scientific evidence to support the claims that ellagic acid can treat or prevent cancer.

== See also ==
- List of ineffective cancer treatments
