= Urolithin B =

Chemical compound

Names
- Preferred IUPAC name 3-Hydroxy-6H-dibenzo[b,d]pyran-6-one
- Other names Uro-B; 3-Hydroxyurolithin

Identifiers
CAS Number	1139-83-9
3D model (JSmol)	Interactive image
ChEMBL	ChEMBL1526978
ChemSpider	4528673
ECHA InfoCard	100.236.446
KEGG	C22596
PubChem CID	5380406
UNII	B1S2YM5F6G
CompTox Dashboard (EPA)	DTXSID00150610
- InChI: InChI=1S/C13H8O3/c14-8-5-6-10-9-3-1-2-4-11(9)13(15)16-12(10)7-8/h1-7,14H Key: WXUQMTRHPNOXBV-UHFFFAOYSA-N
- SMILES: C1=CC=C2C(=C1)C3=C(C=C(C=C3)O)OC2=O

Properties
Chemical formula	C_{13}H_{8}O_{3}
Molar mass	212.204 g·mol^{−1}
- Except where otherwise noted, data are given for materials in their standard state (at 25 °C [77 °F], 100 kPa). Infobox references

Urolithin B (UB) is an urolithin, a type of phenolic compounds produced in the human gut after absorption of ellagitannins-containing food such as pomegranate, strawberries, red raspberries, walnuts or oak-aged red wine. Urolithin B is found in the urine in the form of urolithin B glucuronide.

== See also ==
- Glucuronide
  - Glucuronic acid
- Pomegranate ellagitannins
