= Roburin A =

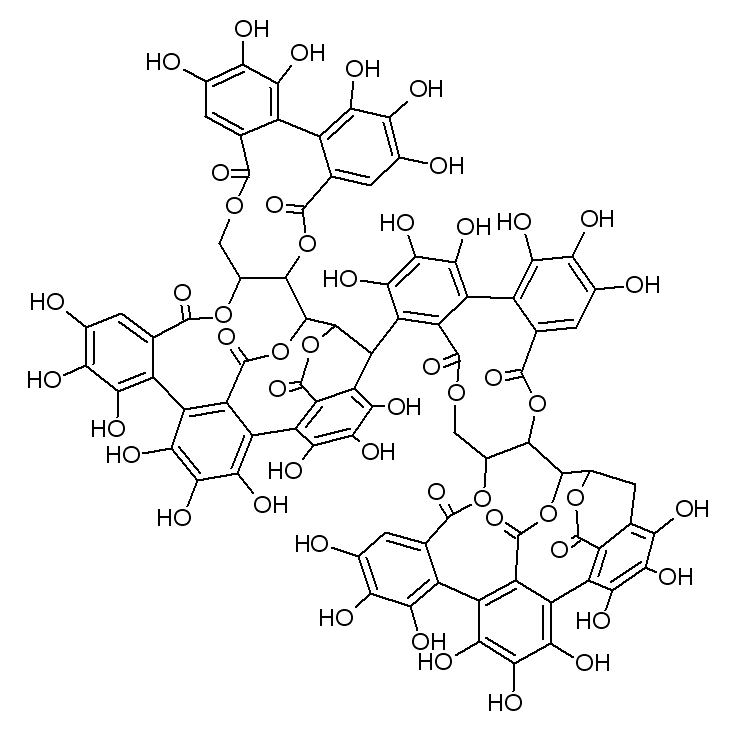
- Chemical structure of roburin A

Identifiers
CAS Number	132864-75-6
3D model (JSmol)	Interactive image
ChemSpider	68024617
PubChem CID	101670390
- InChI: InChI=1S/C82H50O51/c83-13-1-8-20(46(93)41(13)88)21-9(2-14(84)42(89)47(21)94)76(117)128-67-18(6-124-73(8)114)126-74(115)10-3-15(85)43(90)48(95)22(10)26-36-28(54(101)62(109)52(26)99)29-38-33(59(106)65(112)55(29)102)34(69(130-79(38)120)71(67)132-80(36)121)32-35-25(51(98)64(111)58(32)105)24-12(5-17(87)45(92)50(24)97)77(118)129-68-19(7-125-78(35)119)127-75(116)11-4-16(86)44(91)49(96)23(11)27-37-30(56(103)63(110)53(27)100)31-39-40(60(107)66(113)57(31)104)61(108)70(131-82(39)123)72(68)133-81(37)122/h1-5,18-19,34,61,67-72,83-113H,6-7H2/t18-,19+,34+,61+,67-,68+,69-,70-,71+,72+/m0/s1 Key: QTCMAUFCWPWEDU-DMXGXNKNSA-N
- SMILES: C1[C@H]2[C@@H]([C@@H]3[C@@H]4[C@@H](C5=C(C(=C(C(=C5C(=O)O4)C6=C(C(=C(C(=C6C(=O)O3)C7=C(C(=C(C=C7C(=O)O2)O)O)O)O)O)O)O)O)O)C8=C(C(=C(C9=C8C(=O)OC[C@@H]2[C@H]([C@@H]3[C@@H]4[C@@H](C5=C(C(=C(C(=C5C(=O)O4)C4=C(C(=C(C(=C4C(=O)O3)C3=C(C(=C(C=C3C(=O)O2)O)O)O)O)O)O)O)O)O)O)OC(=O)C2=CC(=C(C(=C29)O)O)O)O)O)O)OC(=O)C2=CC(=C(C(=C2C2=C(C(=C(C=C2C(=O)O1)O)O)O)O)O)O

Properties
Chemical formula	C_{82}H_{50}O_{51}
Molar mass	1851.251 g·mol^{−1}
- Except where otherwise noted, data are given for materials in their standard state (at 25 °C [77 °F], 100 kPa). verify (what is ?) Infobox references

Roburin A is a tannin found in oak wood (Quercus robur and Quercus petraea or Quercus alba) or oak cork (Quercus suber).

It is a dimeric compound, composed of two vescalagin subunits probably linked through an ether bond between the diphenoyl group (hexahydroxydiphenic acid or HHDP) of one subunit and the triphenoyl moiety (nonahydroxytriphenic acid) of the other one.
