= Grandinin =

Chemical compound

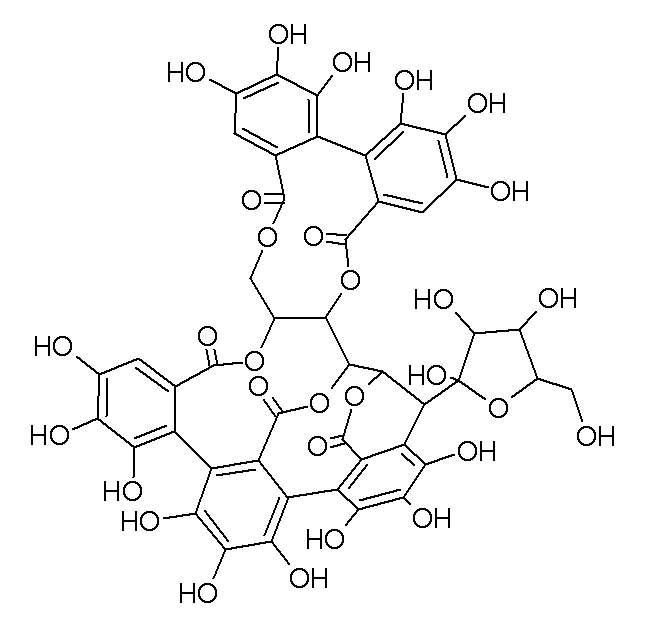
- Chemical structure of grandinin

Names
- IUPAC name (46R)-7,8,9,12,13,14,25,26,27,30,31,32,35,36,37-pentadecahydroxy-46-[(3R,4S)-2,3,4-trihydroxy-5-(hydroxymethyl)oxolan-2-yl]-3,18,21,41,43-pentaoxanonacyclo[27.13.3.1^{38,42}.0^{2,20}.0^{5,10}.0^{11,16}.0^{23,28}.0^{33,45}.0^{34,39}]hexatetraconta-5,7,9,11,13,15,23,25,27,29(45),30,32,34(39),35,37-pentadecaene-4,17,22,40,44-pentone

Identifiers
CAS Number	115166-32-0
3D model (JSmol)	Interactive image
PubChem CID	492392
CompTox Dashboard (EPA)	DTXSID101029292
- InChI: InChI=1S/C46H34O30/c47-4-12-27(54)40(64)46(70,76-12)23-22-21-19(33(60)36(63)34(22)61)18-20-17(31(58)35(62)32(18)59)16-8(3-11(50)26(53)30(16)57)42(66)72-13-5-71-41(65)6-1-9(48)24(51)28(55)14(6)15-7(2-10(49)25(52)29(15)56)43(67)73-37(13)39(75-44(20)68)38(23)74-45(21)69/h1-3,12-13,23,27,37-40,47-64,70H,4-5H2/t12?,13?,23-,27-,37?,38?,39?,40-,46?/m1/s1 Key: GCEXRPOQEVIITL-XJDSPLDHSA-N
- SMILES: C1C2C(C3C4C(C5=C(C(=C(C(=C5C(=O)O4)C6=C(C(=C(C(=C6C(=O)O3)C7=C(C(=C(C=C7C(=O)O2)O)O)O)O)O)O)O)O)O)C8(C(C(C(O8)CO)O)O)O)OC(=O)C9=CC(=C(C(=C9C2=C(C(=C(C=C2C(=O)O1)O)O)O)O)O)O

Properties
Chemical formula	C_{46}H_{34}O_{30}
Molar mass	1066.748 g·mol^{−1}
- Except where otherwise noted, data are given for materials in their standard state (at 25 °C [77 °F], 100 kPa). verify (what is ?) Infobox references

Grandinin is an ellagitannin. It can be found in Melaleuca quinquenervia leaves and in oaks species like the North American white oak (Quercus alba) and European red oak (Quercus robur). It shows antioxydant activity. It is an astringent compound. It is also found in wine, red or white, aged in oak barrels.

It is a castalagin glycoside by binding of the pentose lyxose. It contains a nonahydroxytriphenic acid moiety.

It suppresses the phosphorylation of the epidermal growth factor receptor in human colon carcinoma cells.

== See also ==
- Phenolic compounds in wine
