= Casuarictin =

- Chemical structure of casuarictin

Names
- Systematic IUPAC name (10aR,11S,12aR,25aR,25bS)-2,3,4,5,6,7,17,18,19,20,21,22-Dodecahydroxy-9,15,24,27-tetraoxo-9,10a,11,12a,13,15,24,25a,25b,27-decahydrodibenzo[g,i]dibenzo[6′,7′:8′,9′][1,4]dioxecino[2′,3′:4,5]pyrano[3,2-b][1,5]dioxacycloundecin-11-yl 3,4,5-trihydroxybenzoate
- Other names Sanguiin H 11; Sanguiin H-11; 1(β)-O-Galloylpedunculagin

Identifiers
CAS Number	79786-00-8; 96292-46-5
3D model (JSmol)	Interactive image
ChEMBL	ChEMBL1076705
ChemSpider	66302
PubChem CID	73644
CompTox Dashboard (EPA)	DTXSID401000730
- InChI: InChI=1S/C41H28O26/c42-13-1-8(2-14(43)24(13)48)36(57)67-41-35-34(65-39(60)11-5-17(46)27(51)31(55)22(11)23-12(40(61)66-35)6-18(47)28(52)32(23)56)33-19(63-41)7-62-37(58)9-3-15(44)25(49)29(53)20(9)21-10(38(59)64-33)4-16(45)26(50)30(21)54/h1-6,19,33-35,41-56H,7H2/t19-,33-,34+,35-,41+/m1/s1 Key: SWRFKGRMQVLMKA-JIZJWZDPSA-N; InChI=1/C41H28O26/c42-13-1-8(2-14(43)24(13)48)36(57)67-41-35-34(65-39(60)11-5-17(46)27(51)31(55)22(11)23-12(40(61)66-35)6-18(47)28(52)32(23)56)33-19(63-41)7-62-37(58)9-3-15(44)25(49)29(53)20(9)21-10(38(59)64-33)4-16(45)26(50)30(21)54/h1-6,19,33-35,41-56H,7H2/t19-,33-,34+,35-,41+/m1/s1 Key: SWRFKGRMQVLMKA-JIZJWZDPBX
- SMILES: c1c(cc(c(c1O)O)O)C(=O)O[C@H]2[C@H]3[C@H]([C@H]4[C@H](O2)COC(=O)c5cc(c(c(c5-c6c(cc(c(c6O)O)O)C(=O)O4)O)O)O)OC(=O)c7cc(c(c(c7-c8c(cc(c(c8O)O)O)C(=O)O3)O)O)O

Properties
Chemical formula	C_{41}H_{28}O_{26}
Molar mass	936.64 g/mol
- Except where otherwise noted, data are given for materials in their standard state (at 25 °C [77 °F], 100 kPa). verify (what is ?) Infobox references

Casuarictin is an ellagitannin, a type of hydrolysable tannin. It can be found in Casuarina and Stachyurus species.

It is formed from two hexahydroxydiphenic acid units and one gallic acid unit linked to a glucose molecule.

The molecule is formed from tellimagrandin II, itself formed from pentagalloyl glucose via oxidation. Casuarictin is transformed into pedunculagin via loss of a gallate group, and further into castalagin via glucose pyranose ring opening.

== Oligomers ==
Sanguiin H-6 is a dimer, Lambertianin C is trimer and lambertianin D is a tetramer of casuarictin.
