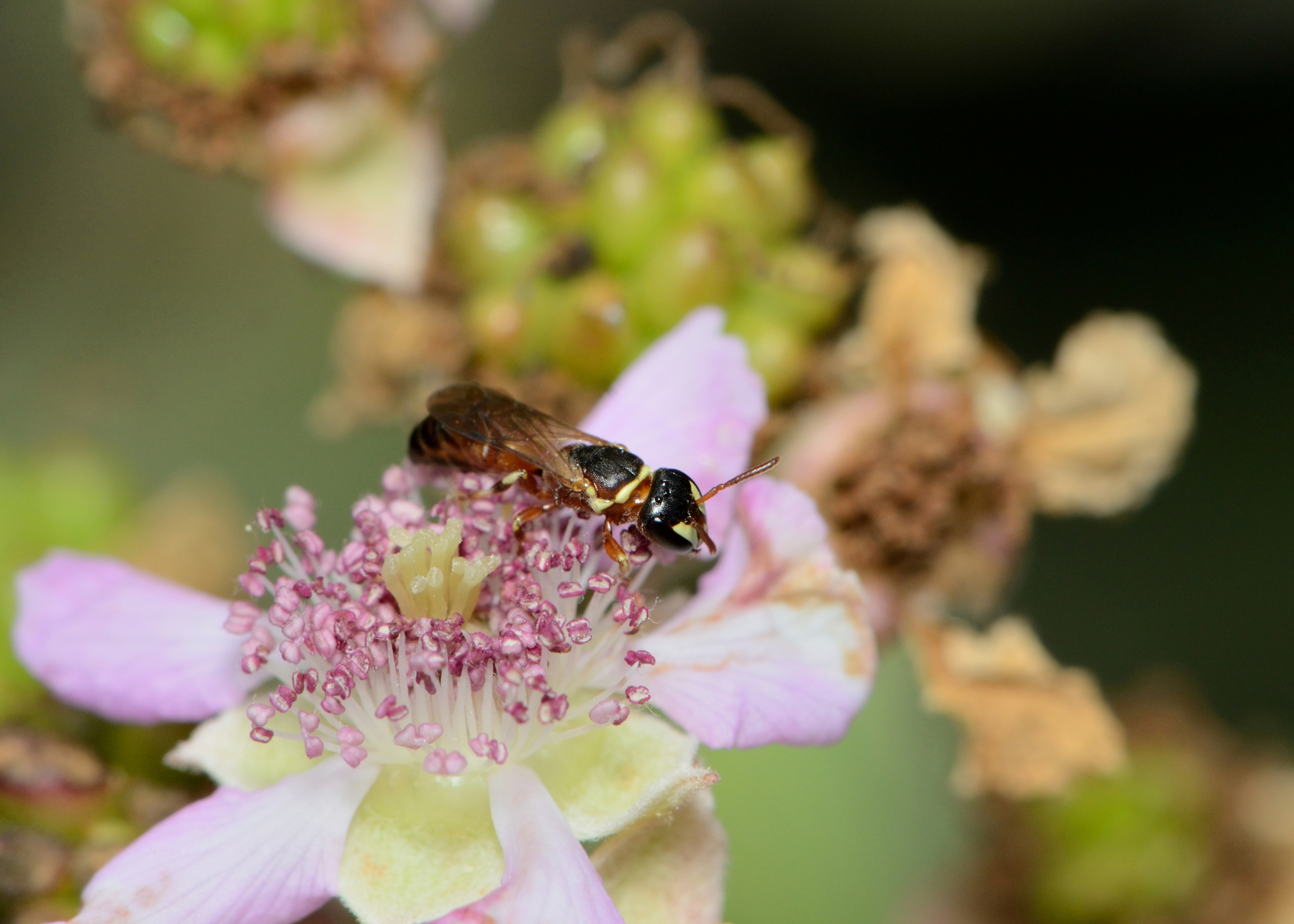
- Rubus creticus flower with Hylaeus rubicola bee

Scientific classification
- Kingdom: Plantae
- Clade: Tracheophytes
- Clade: Angiosperms
- Clade: Eudicots
- Clade: Rosids
- Order: Rosales
- Family: Rosaceae
- Genus: Rubus
- Species: R. creticus

Binomial name
- Rubus creticus Tourn. ex L.

Synonyms
- List: Rubus parviflorus Weston; Rubus sanctus Schreb.; Rubus ulmifolius subsp. sanctus Sudre; Rubus albicans Krašan; Rubus amoenus (Port. ex Vis.) Focke; Rubus anatolicus (Focke) Hausskn.; Rubus dalmatinus (Tratt.) Guss.; Rubus dalmatinus f. ardeatina Evers; Rubus discolor Boiss.; Rubus discolor var. amoenus (Port. ex Vis.) Pérez Lara; Rubus discolor subsp. amoenus (Port. ex Vis.) Nyman; Rubus fruticosus var. amoenus Port. ex W.D.J.Koch; Rubus fruticosus var. amoenus Port. ex Vis.; Rubus fruticosus f. dalmatinus (Tratt.) Fiori; Rubus fruticosus var. dalmatinus Tratt.; Rubus rotundifolius Krašan; Rubus sanctus var. chaniensis J.Scheff.; Rubus sanctus var. cretensis J.Scheff.; Rubus sanctus f. cuneatus Hruby; Rubus sanctus f. cyclophyllus Hruby; Rubus sanctus f. orientalis Czecott & Hruby; Rubus sanguineus Friv.; Rubus sanguineus var. cyclophyllus (Hruby) Markova; Rubus turcomanicus Freyn; Rubus ulmifolius subsp. anatolicus Focke; Rubus ulmifolius var. anatolicus (Focke) Heldr.; Rubus ulmifolius var. dalmatinus (Tratt.) Evers; Rubus ulmifolius subsp. dalmatinus (Tratt.) Focke; Rubus ulmifolius dalmatinus (Tratt.) Focke

= Rubus creticus =

Species of flowering plant

Rubus creticus is a species of scrambling shrub in the family Rosaceae with a native range extending from the eastern mediterranean towards Turkmenistan and the western Himalaya.

== Chemistry ==
3,6-Di-O-caffeoylglucose, 1-O-caffeoylxylose and 2,3-O-hexahydroxydiphenoyl-4,6-O-sanguisorboyl-(α/β)-glucose (an ellagitannin constituted with sanguisorbic acid), are found in R. ulmifolius subsp. sanctus.

== Distribution and habitat ==
It is native to Afghanistan, Albania, Bulgaria, Cyprus, the Eastern Aegean Islands, Egypt, Greece, Iran, Iraq, Crete, Crimea, Lebanon, Syria, Libya, the North Caucasus, the North-Western Balkans, Pakistan, Palestine, Saudi Arabia, the Sinai, Transcaucasia, Turkmenistan, Turkey, and the Western Himalayas.
