= Lambertianin D =

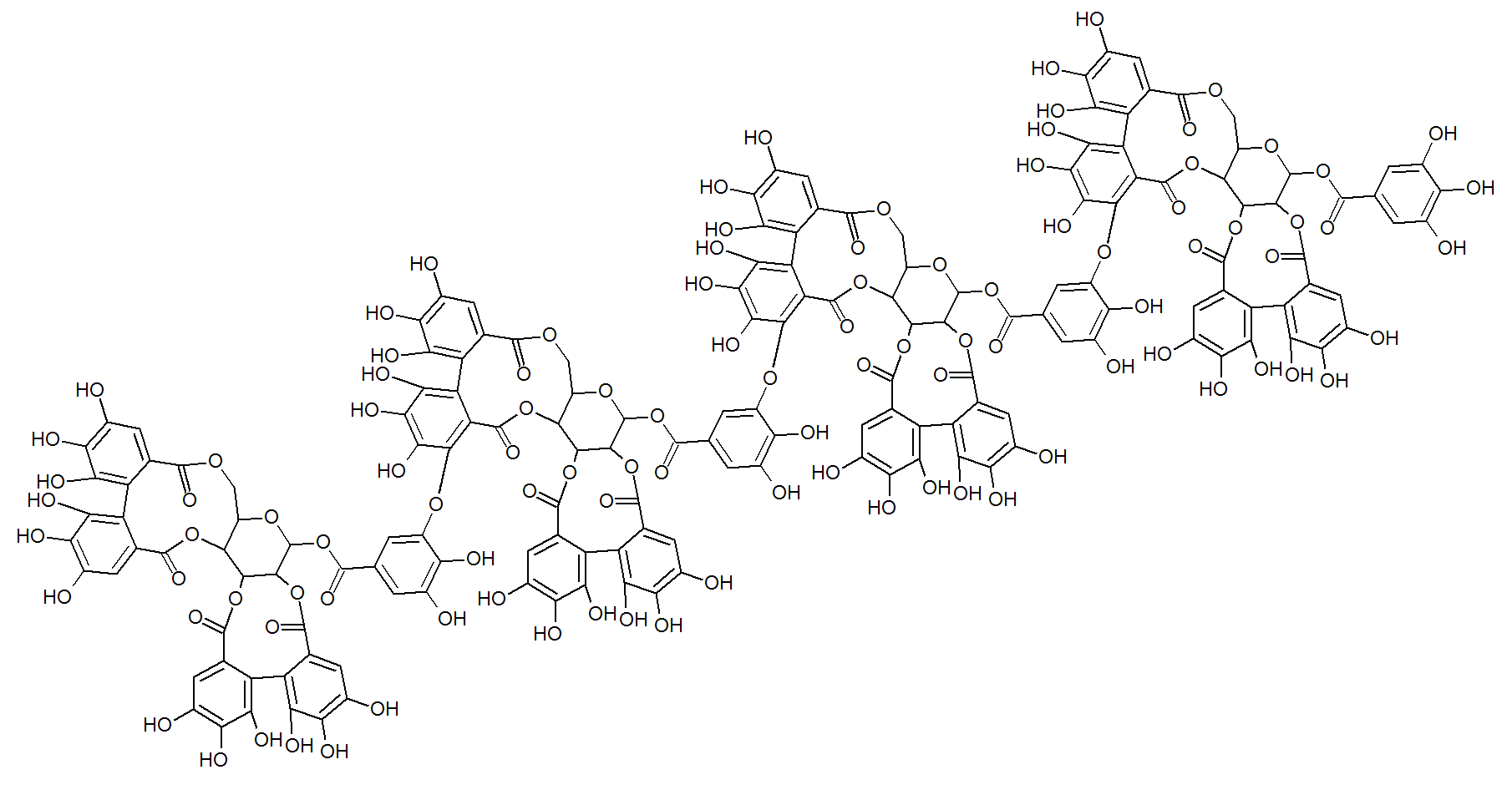
- Chemical structure of lambertianin D

Names
- Systematic IUPAC name (10aR,11S,12aR,25aR,25bS)-2,3,4,5,6,7,17,18,19,20,21,22-Dodecahydroxy-9,15,24,27-tetraoxo-9,10a,11,12a,13,15,24,25a,25b,27-decahydrodibenzo[g,i]dibenzo[6′,7′:8′,9′][1,4]dioxecino[2′,3′:4,5]pyrano[3,2-b][1,5]dioxacycloundecin-11-yl (3^{10a}R,3^{11}S,3^{12a}R,3^{25a}R,3^{25b}S,8^{10a}R,8^{11}S,8^{12a}R,8^{25a}R,8^{25b}S,13^{10a}R,13^{11}R,13^{12a}R,13^{25a}R,13^{25b}S)-1^{5},1^{6},3^{2},3^{3},3^{4},3^{5},3^{6},3^{7},3^{17},3^{18},3^{19},3^{20},3^{21},3^{22},6^{4},6^{5},8^{2},8^{3},8^{4},8^{5},8^{6},8^{7},8^{17},8^{18},8^{19},8^{20},8^{21},8^{22},11^{4},11^{5},13^{2},13^{3},13^{4},13^{5},13^{6},13^{7},13^{17},13^{18},13^{19},13^{20},13^{21},13^{22},16^{3},16^{4},16^{5}-pentatetracontahydroxy-3^{9},3^{15},3^{24},3^{27},5,8^{9},8^{15},8^{24},8^{27},10,13^{9},13^{15},13^{24},13^{27},15-pentadecaoxo-3^{9},3^{10a},3^{11},3^{12a},3^{13},3^{15},3^{24},3^{25a},3^{25b},3^{27},8^{9},8^{10a},8^{11},8^{12a},8^{13},8^{15},8^{24},8^{25a},8^{25b},8^{27},13^{9},13^{10a},13^{11},13^{12a},13^{13},13^{15},13^{24},13^{25a},13^{25b},13^{27}-triacontahydro-2,4,7,9,12,14-hexaoxa-3,8,13(22,11)-tris(dibenzo[g,i]dibenzo[6′,7′:8′,9′][1,4]dioxecino[2′,3′:4,5]pyrano[3,2-b][1,5]dioxacycloundecina)-1,16(1),6,11(1,3)-tetrabenzenahexadecaphane-1^{3}-carboxylate
- Other names Rubusuaviin E

Identifiers
CAS Number	152617-89-5
3D model (JSmol)	Interactive image
ChemSpider	58993330
PubChem CID	44460483
- InChI: InChI=1S/C164H106O104/c165-43-1-26(2-44(166)87(43)183)141(222)265-161-138-134(258-151(232)36-15-54(176)94(190)107(203)71(36)75-40(155(236)262-138)19-58(180)98(194)111(75)207)127-65(250-161)23-243-146(227)31-10-49(171)101(197)114(210)78(31)81-84(158(239)254-127)130(123(219)120(216)117(81)213)247-62-7-28(4-46(168)89(62)185)143(224)267-163-140-136(260-153(234)38-17-56(178)96(192)109(205)73(38)77-42(157(238)264-140)21-60(182)100(196)113(77)209)129-67(252-163)25-245-148(229)33-12-51(173)103(199)116(212)80(33)83-86(160(241)256-129)132(125(221)122(218)119(83)215)248-63-8-29(5-47(169)90(63)186)144(225)268-164-139-135(259-152(233)37-16-55(177)95(191)108(204)72(37)76-41(156(237)263-139)20-59(181)99(195)112(76)208)128-66(251-164)24-244-147(228)32-11-50(172)102(198)115(211)79(32)82-85(159(240)255-128)131(124(220)121(217)118(82)214)246-61-6-27(3-45(167)88(61)184)142(223)266-162-137-133(257-150(231)35-14-53(175)93(189)106(202)70(35)74-39(154(235)261-137)18-57(179)97(193)110(74)206)126-64(249-162)22-242-145(226)30-9-48(170)91(187)104(200)68(30)69-34(149(230)253-126)13-52(174)92(188)105(69)201/h1-21,64-67,126-129,133-140,161-221H,22-25H2 Key: WZQCGDLPTFKQNG-UHFFFAOYSA-N
- SMILES: C1C2C(C3C(C(O2)OC(=O)C4=CC(=C(C(=C4)OC5=C(C(=C(C6=C5C(=O)OC7C(COC(=O)C8=CC(=C(C(=C86)O)O)O)OC(C9C7OC(=O)C2=CC(=C(C(=C2C2=C(C(=C(C=C2C(=O)O9)O)O)O)O)O)O)OC(=O)C2=CC(=C(C(=C2)OC2=C(C(=C(C4=C2C(=O)OC2C(COC(=O)C5=CC(=C(C(=C54)O)O)O)OC(C4C2OC(=O)C2=CC(=C(C(=C2C2=C(C(=C(C=C2C(=O)O4)O)O)O)O)O)O)OC(=O)C2=CC(=C(C(=C2)OC2=C(C(=C(C4=C2C(=O)OC2C(COC(=O)C5=CC(=C(C(=C54)O)O)O)OC(C4C2OC(=O)C2=CC(=C(C(=C2C2=C(C(=C(C=C2C(=O)O4)O)O)O)O)O)O)OC(=O)C2=CC(=C(C(=C2)O)O)O)O)O)O)O)O)O)O)O)O)O)O)O)O)O)O)OC(=O)C2=CC(=C(C(=C2C2=C(C(=C(C=C2C(=O)O3)O)O)O)O)O)O)OC(=O)C2=CC(=C(C(=C2C2=C(C(=C(C=C2C(=O)O1)O)O)O)O)O)O

Properties
Chemical formula	C_{164}H_{106}O_{104}
Molar mass	3740.415 g/mol
- Except where otherwise noted, data are given for materials in their standard state (at 25 °C [77 °F], 100 kPa). Infobox references

Lambertianin D is an ellagitannin found in Rubus lambertianus.

It is tetramer of casuarictin linked by sanguisorbic acid ester groups between glucopyranose moieties.
