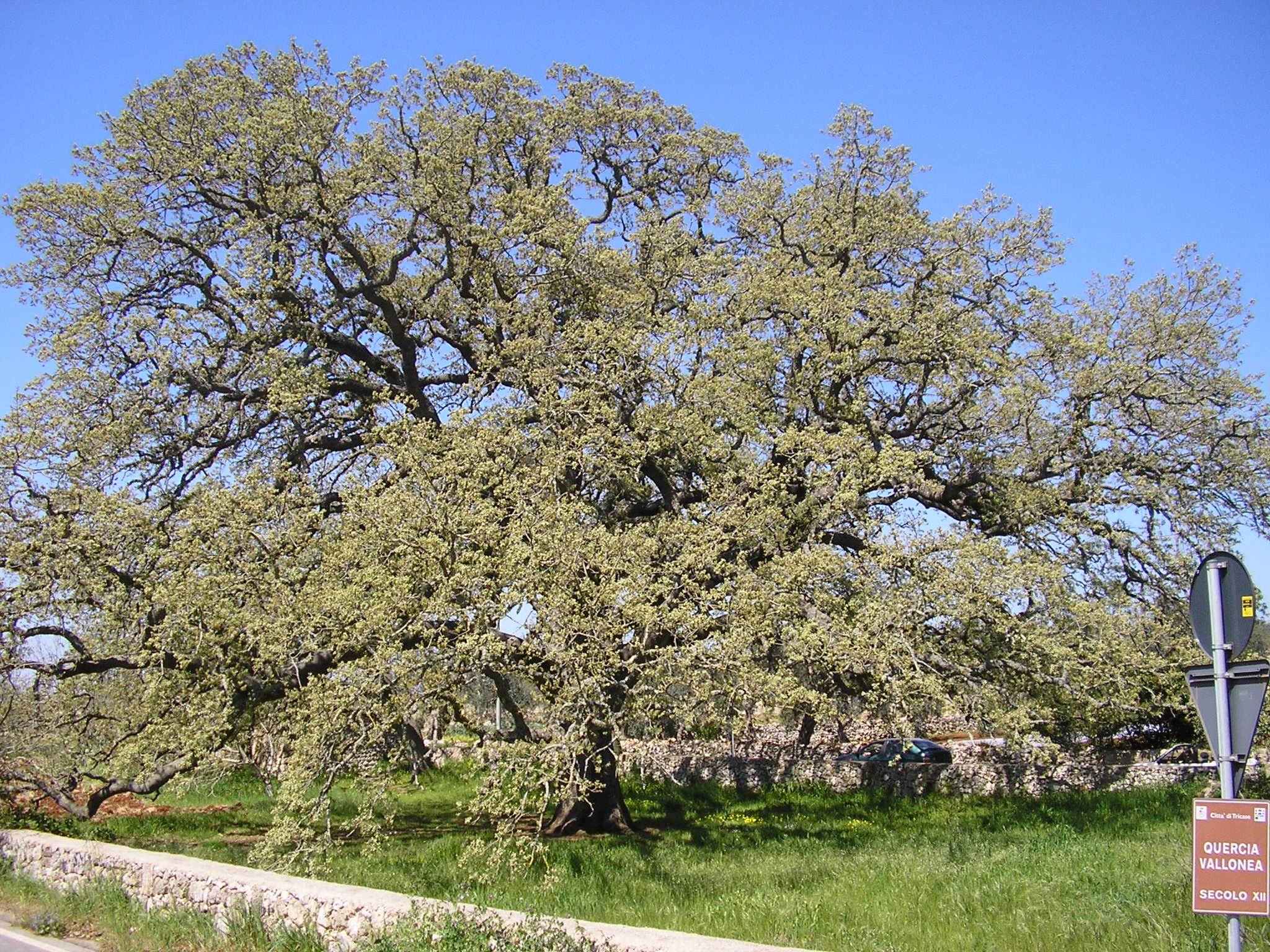
- Growing at Tricase, Lecce

Scientific classification
- Kingdom: Plantae
- Clade: Tracheophytes
- Clade: Angiosperms
- Clade: Eudicots
- Clade: Rosids
- Order: Fagales
- Family: Fagaceae
- Genus: Quercus
- Species: Q. ithaburensis
- Subspecies: Q. i. subsp. macrolepis

Trinomial name
- Quercus ithaburensis subsp. macrolepis (Kotschy) Hedge & Yalt.
- Quercus ithaburensis subsp. macrolepis is the subspecies found in most of the species' range.

Synonyms
- Quercus aegilops subsp. macrolepis (Kotschy) A.Camus; Quercus aegilops subsp. pyrami (Kotschy) A.Camus; Quercus aegilops subsp. vallonea (Kotschy) A.Camus; Quercus aegilops L., nom. rej.; Quercus agriobalanidea Papaioannou; Quercus cretica Bald.; Quercus echinata Lam.; Quercus ehrenbergii Kotschy; Quercus graeca Kotschy; Quercus hypoleuca Kotschy ex A.DC.; Quercus macrolepis Kotschy; Quercus massana Ehrenb. ex Wenz.; Quercus pyrami Kotschy; Quercus vallonea A.DC.; Quercus vallonea Kotschy; Quercus ventricosa Koehne

= Quercus ithaburensis subsp. macrolepis =

Species of oak tree

Quercus ithaburensis subsp. macrolepis, the Valonia oak, is a subspecies of Quercus ithaburensis, a member of the beech family, Fagaceae. It may also be treated as a separate species, Quercus macrolepis.

== Taxonomy ==
The Valonia oak was first described as the species Quercus macrolepis by Carl Friedrich Kotschy in 1860. It was reduced to a subspecies of Quercus ithaburensis in 1981. Within the oak genus, Q. ithaburensis is classified in the subgenus Cerris, section Cerris, which includes Quercus cerris, the Turkey oak, and related species. It is most closely related to Quercus brantii, Brant's oak.

== Distribution ==
Quercus ithaburensis subsp. macrolepis is native from south-east Italy, through the Balkans (Albania, Bulgaria, former Yugoslavia) and Greece (including Crete and the East Aegean Islands), to the eastern Mediterranean (Turkey, Lebanon and Syria). It is absent from the Palestine region, where only the subspecies ithaburensis occurs.

== Gallery ==
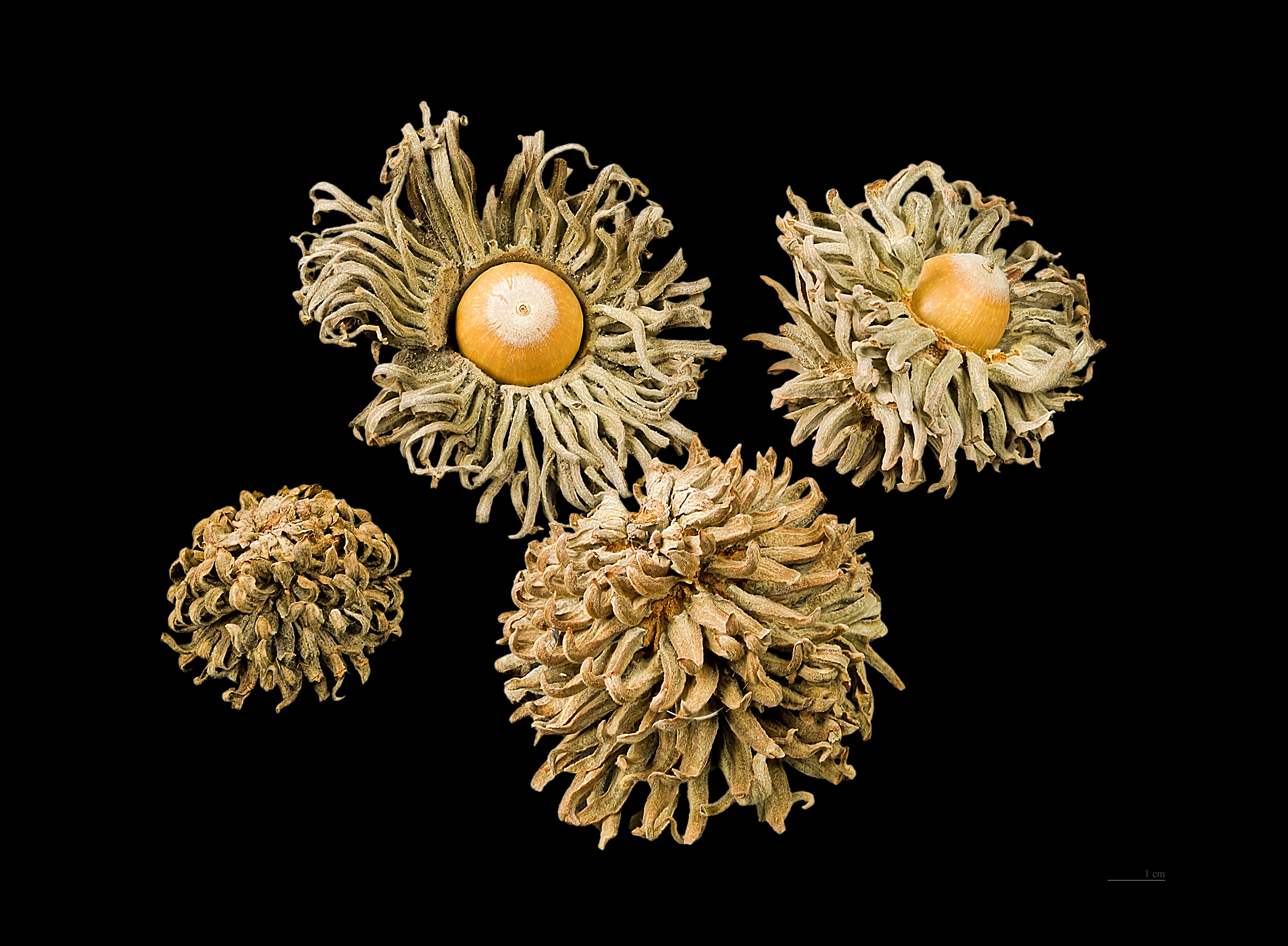
Acorns

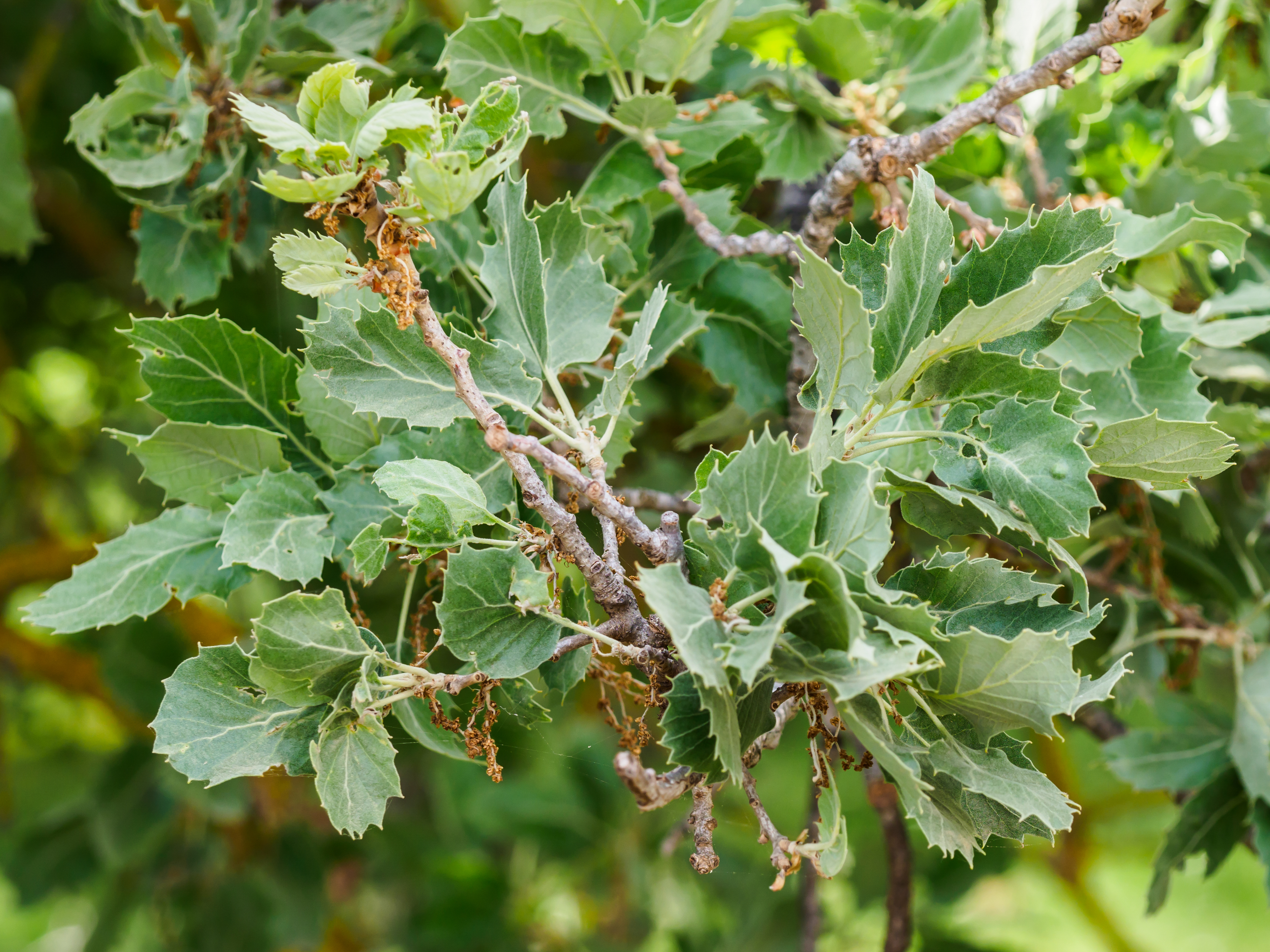
Foliage

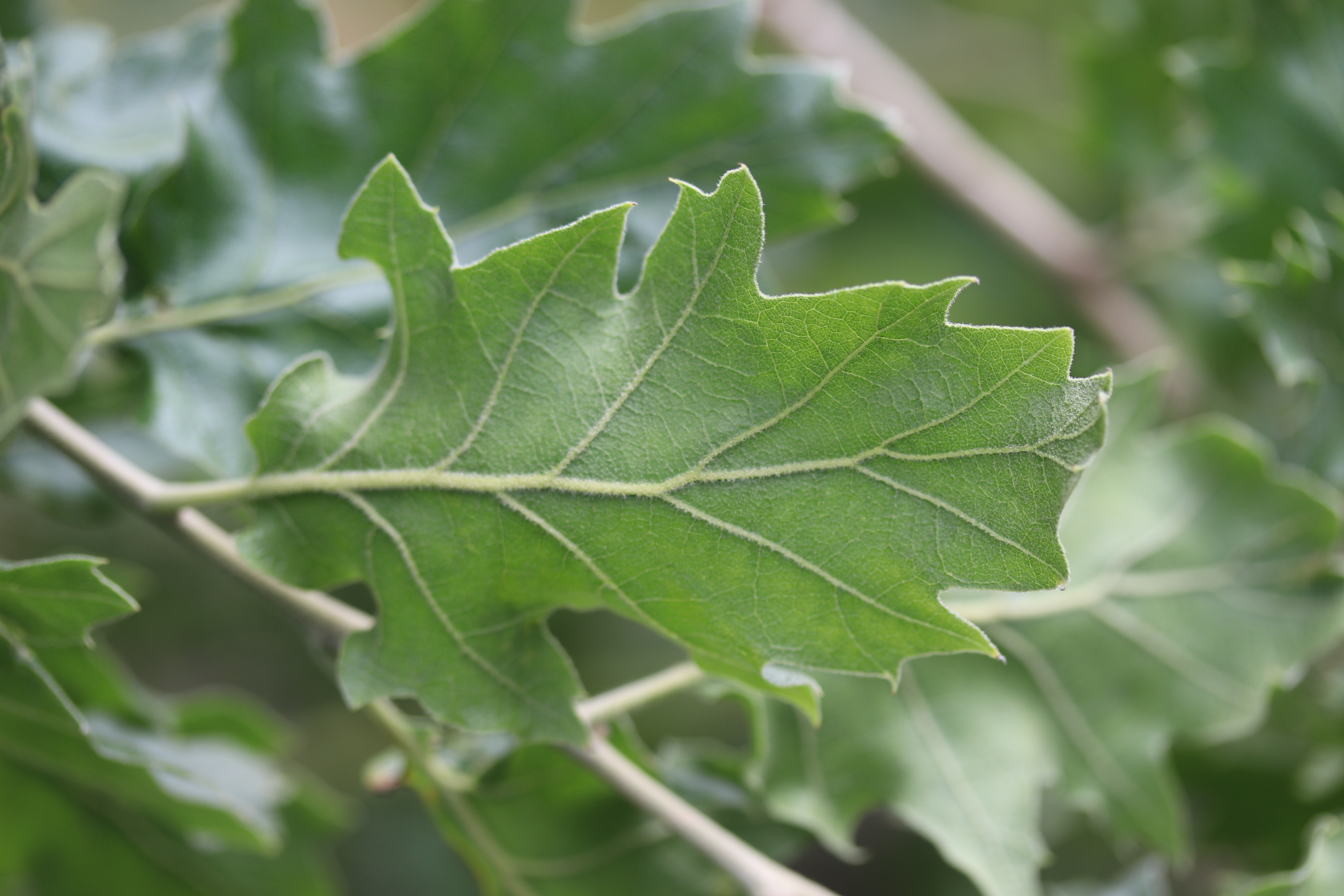
Leaf underside

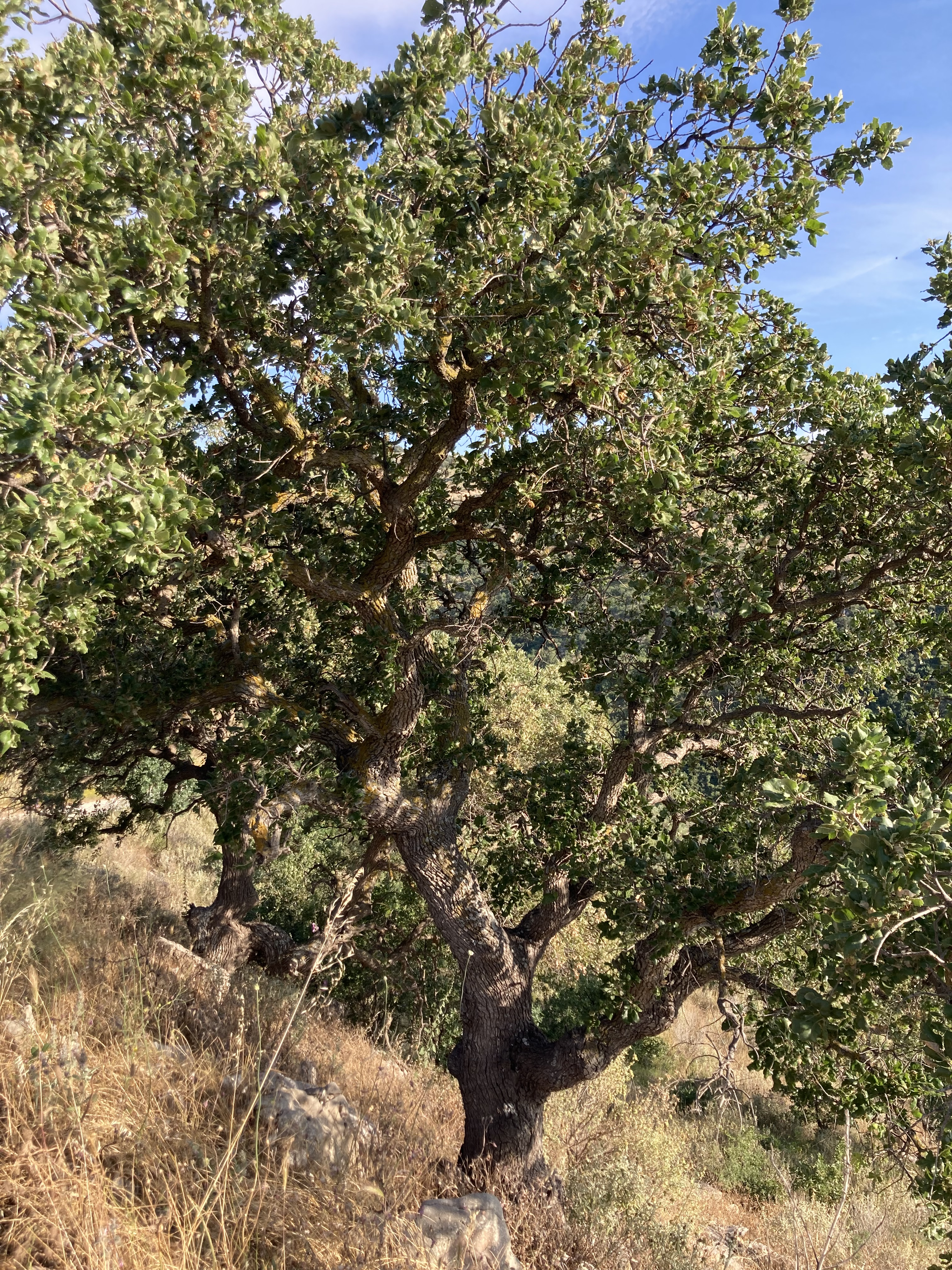
Detail showing the bark and leaves

== Uses ==
The cups, known as valonia, are used for tanning and dyeing as are the unripe acorns called camata or camatina. The ripe acorns are eaten raw or boiled.

== See also ==
- Valoneic acid
