= Urolithin =

Group of chemical compounds

Chemical structure of urolithin A.

Urolithins are microflora metabolites of dietary ellagic acid derivatives, such as ellagitannins. They are produced in the gut, and found in the urine in the form of urolithin B glucuronide after absorption of ellagitannins-containing foods, such as pomegranate. During intestinal metabolism by bacteria, ellagitannins and punicalagins are converted to urolithins, which have unknown biological activity in vivo.

Ellagitannins exhibit low bioavailability and are transformed in the gut to ellagic acid and its microbiota metabolites. Urolithins are found in plasma mostly as glucuronides at low concentrations. Urolithins production is dependent on the gut microbiome enterotype. Individuals producing urolithins show a much higher abundance of the Clostridium leptum group of Firmicutes phylum than Bacteroides or Prevotella.

== Known molecules ==
- Urolithin A (3,8-Dihydroxyurolithin)
- Urolithin A glucuronide
- Urolithin B (3-Hydroxyurolithin)
- urolithin B glucuronide
- Urolithin D (3,4,8,9-Tetrahydroxyurolithin)

catabolic intermediates:

- Urolithin M-5
- Urolithin M-6
- Urolithin M-7
- Urolithin C (3,8,9-Trihydroxy urolithin)
- Urolithin E (2,3,8,10-Tetrahydroxy urolithin)

== See also ==
- Pomegranate ellagitannins
