= Nonahydroxytriphenic acid =

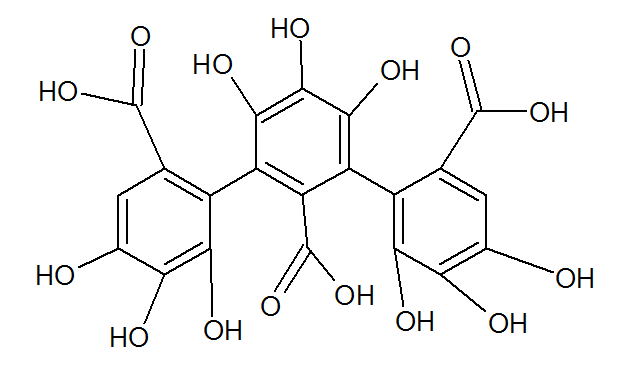

Names
- Preferred IUPAC name 1^{4},1^{5},1^{6},2^{3},2^{4},2^{5},3^{4},3^{5},3^{6}-Nonahydroxy[1^{1},2^{1}:2^{3},3^{1}-terphenyl]-1^{2},2^{2},3^{2}-tricarboxylic acid
- Other names Nonahydroxytriphenoyl

Identifiers
3D model (JSmol)	Interactive image
ChemSpider	35308523
PubChem CID	102494986
CompTox Dashboard (EPA)	DTXSID601030303
- InChI: InChI=1S/C21H14O15/c22-5-1-3(19(31)32)7(14(26)12(5)24)9-11(21(35)36)10(17(29)18(30)16(9)28)8-4(20(33)34)2-6(23)13(25)15(8)27/h1-2,22-30H,(H,31,32)(H,33,34)(H,35,36) Key: KLKCDGZVVKFBQP-UHFFFAOYSA-N
- SMILES: Oc2c(c1c(cc(O)c(O)c1O)C(=O)O)c(c(c(O)c2O)c3c(cc(O)c(O)c3O)C(=O)O)C(=O)O

Properties
Chemical formula	C_{21}H_{14}O_{15}
Molar mass	506.328 g·mol^{−1}
- Except where otherwise noted, data are given for materials in their standard state (at 25 °C [77 °F], 100 kPa). Infobox references

Nonahydroxytriphenic acid is a moiety found in some ellagitannins such as roburin A, B, C and D, castalagin or grandinin.
