= Mallotusinic acid =

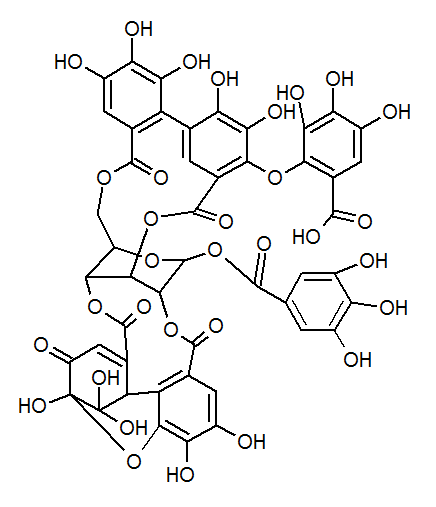

Names
- Other names Mallotusinic acid

Identifiers
| CAS Number | 66421-47-4 |
| 3D model (JSmol) | Interactive image |
| KEGG | C10235 |
| PubChem CID | 16131237 |
| CompTox Dashboard (EPA) | DTXSID201030301 |
- InChI: InChI=1S/C48H32O32/c49-15-1-9(2-16(50)27(15)55)41(65)79-46-39-38-36(76-45(69)13-7-22(54)48(72)47(70,71)26(13)25-11(43(67)78-39)4-19(53)30(58)37(25)80-48)21(75-46)8-73-42(66)10-3-17(51)28(56)32(60)23(10)24-12(44(68)77-38)6-20(31(59)33(24)61)74-35-14(40(63)64)5-18(52)29(57)34(35)62/h1-7,21,26,36,38-39,46,49-53,55-62,70-72H,8H2,(H,63,64) Key: MWPRJJBXNINUTQ-UHFFFAOYSA-N
- SMILES: Oc2c(O)cc(cc2O)C(=O)OC5OC6COC(=O)c(cc(O)c(O)c4O)c4-c(c(O)c(O)c7Oc8c(C(O)=O)cc(O)c(O)c8O)cc7C(=O)OC(C5OC(=O)c3cc(O)c1O)C6OC(=O)C%10=CC(=O)C9(O)Oc1c3C%10C9(O)O

Properties
| Chemical formula | C_{48}H_{32}O_{32} |
| Molar mass | 1120.74 g/mol |
- Except where otherwise noted, data are given for materials in their standard state (at 25 °C [77 °F], 100 kPa). Infobox references

Mallotusinic acid is a hydrolysable tannin found in the bark of Mallotus japonicus. It is more generally present in Geraniales.
