= Rubus lambertianus =

Scientific classification
- Kingdom: Plantae
- Clade: Embryophytes
- Clade: Tracheophytes
- Clade: Spermatophytes
- Clade: Angiosperms
- Clade: Eudicots
- Clade: Rosids
- Order: Rosales
- Family: Rosaceae
- Genus: Rubus
- Subgenus: Rubus subg. Malachobatus
- Species: R. lambertianus

Binomial name
- Rubus lambertianus Ser.

Species of plant

Rubus lambertianus is an Asian species of bramble.

== Description ==
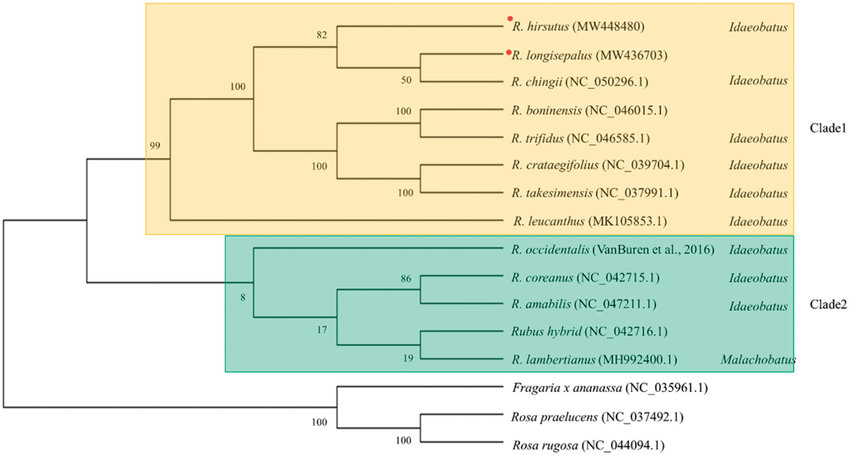
Rubus phylogenetic tree

Rubus lambertianus is a lianoid, semi-deciduous shrub that can grow up to 3 metres (10 feet) tall. The flowers are white and 7–9 millimetres (1/4–3/8 inch) in diameter. The mature berries are red and 6–8 mm (1/4–3/8 in) in diameter.

The ploidy of the species is 2n = 4X (tetraploid). The plant contains the ellagitannins lambertianin A, B, C and D.

== Distribution and habitat ==
It is found in Southern China (including Hainan), Taiwan, Japan, and Thailand.

In China, it occurs on slopes, roadsides, montane valleys, stony ravines, grasslands, thickets, sparse forests, and forest margins at elevations of 200–2,500 m (660–8,200 ft) above sea level. In Taiwan, it is common in thickets at medium elevations.
