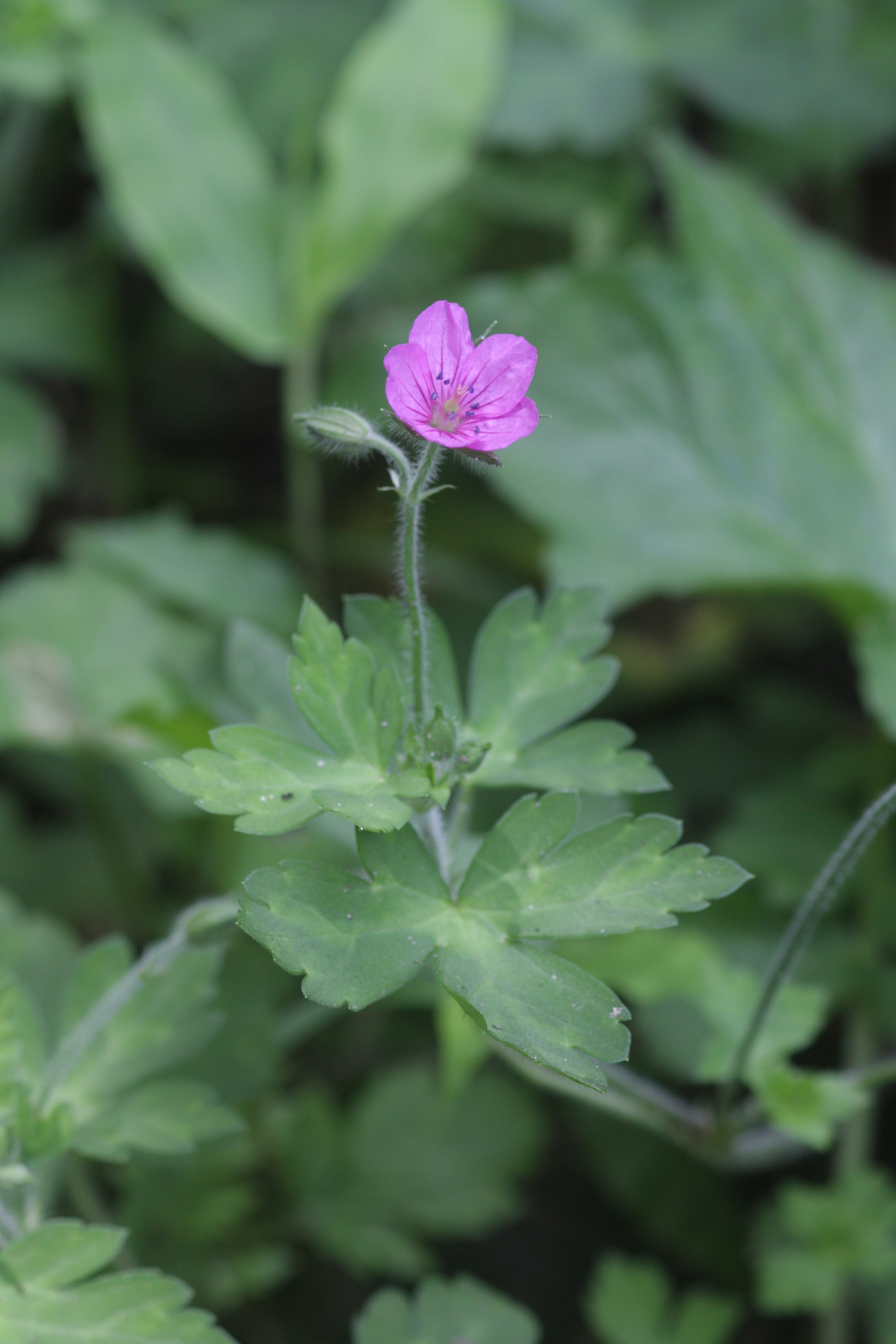
- Geranium thunbergii in Mudeungsan mountain, Korea

Scientific classification
- Kingdom: Plantae
- Clade: Tracheophytes
- Clade: Angiosperms
- Clade: Eudicots
- Clade: Rosids
- Order: Geraniales
- Family: Geraniaceae
- Genus: Geranium
- Species: G. thunbergii

Binomial name
- Geranium thunbergii Siebold ex Lindl. & Paxt., 1851

= Geranium thunbergii =

Species of flowering plant

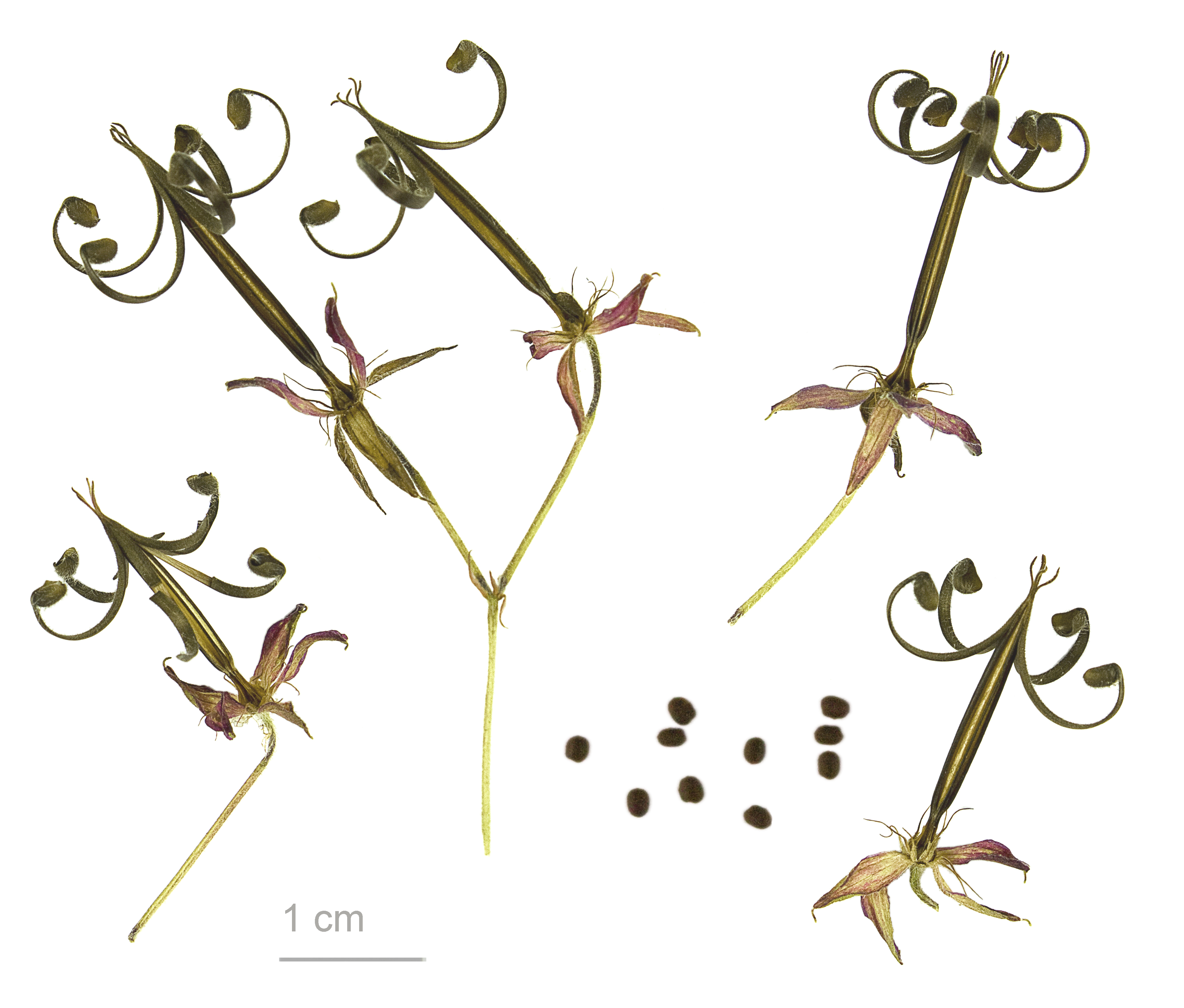
Geranium thunbergii - MHNT

Geranium thunbergii (Thunberg's geranium) is a cranesbill species that is commonly known as Japanese geranium or Japanese cranesbill. It is one of the most popular folk medicines and also an official antidiarrheic drug in Japan. It is called ゲンノショウコ.

Geraniin is an ellagitannin found in G. thunbergii.
