= Carl Friedrich Kotschy =

Austrian Protestant theologian and botanist

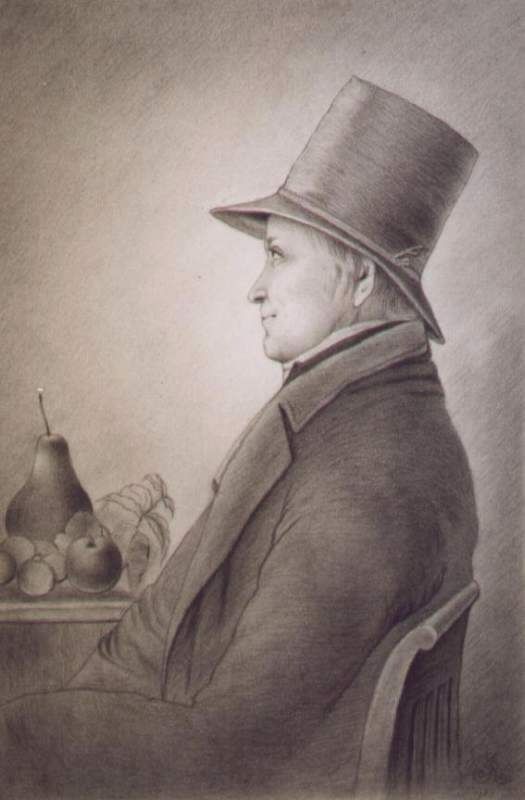
Caricature of Carl Friedrich Kotschy (1789-1856)

Carl Friedrich Kotschy (Polish: Karol Fryderyk Kotschy, Karol Koczy, 26 January 1789 – 9 February 1856) was an Austrian Protestant theologian and botanist born in Cieszyn, Poland). He was the father of botanist Theodor Kotschy (1813–1866).

From 1807 to 1810 he studied theology and botany at the University of Leipzig, and afterwards travelled through France and Switzerland. In Switzerland he met with renowned educator Johann Heinrich Pestalozzi (1746–1827).

From 1810 until his death he worked as a minister in Ustroń, a predominantly Polish-speaking town in the Cieszyn Silesian region of Austria. Here he translated Czech and German language works into Polish, and penned instructional books in Polish for elementary schools. He was also the author of several religious works, including a revision of the Lutheran catechism (1833) and a book of Biblical stories (1844).

As a botanist, he performed studies of local flora, especially vegetation native to the Silesian Beskids. He specialized in the field of pomology, publishing in 1844 a book on fruit orchards.

He was 1848/49 also Member of the Frankfurt Parliament.

His son was Theodor Kotschy.
