= Castalin =

- Chemical structure of castalin

Identifiers
CAS Number	19086-75-0
3D model (JSmol)	Interactive image
ChemSpider	59696884
PubChem CID	99973
UNII	BA7JCC4U52
CompTox Dashboard (EPA)	DTXSID901029284
- InChI: InChI=1S/C27H20O18/c28-2-5-14(31)23-24-20(37)12-11(27(42)45-24)9(18(35)22(39)19(12)36)8-10(26(41)44-23)7(16(33)21(38)17(8)34)6-3(25(40)43-5)1-4(29)13(30)15(6)32/h1,5,14,20,23-24,28-39H,2H2 Key: PPUHUWSVCUJGTD-UHFFFAOYSA-N
- SMILES: C1=C2C(=C(C(=C1O)O)O)C3=C4C(=C(C(=C3O)O)O)C5=C6C(=C(C(=C5O)O)O)C(C(C(C(C(OC2=O)CO)O)OC4=O)OC6=O)O

Properties
Chemical formula	C_{27}H_{20}O_{18}
Molar mass	632.439 g·mol^{−1}
- Except where otherwise noted, data are given for materials in their standard state (at 25 °C [77 °F], 100 kPa). verify (what is ?) Infobox references

Castalin is an ellagitannin. It can be found in oak wood and in Melaleuca quinquenervia leaves.
