= Ellagitannin =

Diverse class of hydrolyzable tannins, a type of polyphenol

Castalagin is a representative ellagitannin, characterized by coupled gallic acid substituents

The ellagitannins are a diverse class of hydrolyzable tannins, a type of polyphenol formed primarily from the oxidative linkage of galloyl groups in 1,2,3,4,6-pentagalloyl glucose. Ellagitannins differ from gallotannins, in that their galloyl groups are linked through C-C bonds, whereas the galloyl groups in gallotannins are linked by depside bonds.

Ellagitannins contain various numbers of hexahydroxydiphenoyl units, as well as galloyl units and/or sanguisorboyl units bounded to sugar moiety. In order to determine the quantity of every individual unit, the hydrolysis of the extracts with trifluoroacetic acid in methanol/water system is performed. Hexahydroxydiphenic acid, created after hydrolysis, spontaneously lactonized to ellagic acid, and sanguisorbic acid to sanguisorbic acid dilactone, while gallic acid remains intact.

Ellagitannins generally form macrocycles, whereas gallotannins do not.

== Examples ==
- Castalagin
- Castalin
- Casuarictin
- Grandinin
- Oenothein B from Willowherbs (Epilobium spp.)
- Roburin A
- Tellimagrandin II
- Terflavin B
- Vescalagin
- Pomegranate ellagitannins, many compounds
  - Punicalagin
  - Punicalin

== Metabolism ==
=== Degradation ===
Urolithins, such as urolithin A, are microflora human metabolites of dietary ellagic acid derivatives.

== Natural occurrences ==
Ellagitannins are reported in dicotyledoneous angiosperms, and notably in species in the order Myrtales, such as the pomegranate. Additionally, the circumboreal wildflower fireweed has been found to have an abundance of ellagitannins.

== See also ==
- Urolithin - Urolithin A
- Polyphenols
- List of antioxidants in food

== Other links ==
- MALDI-TOF Mass Spectrometric Analysis of Hydrolysable Tannins
