= Hexahydroxydiphenic acid =

Oxidatively coupled derivative of gallic acid

- Chemical structure of hexahydroxydiphenic acid

Names
- Preferred IUPAC name 4,4′,5,5′,6,6′-Hexahydroxy[1,1′-biphenyl]-2,2′-dicarboxylic acid
- Other names HHDP; 3,4,5,3′,4′,5′-Hexahydroxydiphenate; 3,4,5,3′,4′,5′-Hexahydroxydiphenic acid

Identifiers
CAS Number	128785-08-0
3D model (JSmol)	Interactive image
ChemSpider	8490515
PubChem CID	10315050
CompTox Dashboard (EPA)	DTXSID901029565
- InChI: InChI=1S/C14H10O10/c15-5-1-3(13(21)22)7(11(19)9(5)17)8-4(14(23)24)2-6(16)10(18)12(8)20/h1-2,15-20H,(H,21,22)(H,23,24) Key: MFTSECOLKFLUSD-UHFFFAOYSA-N; InChI=1/C14H10O10/c15-5-1-3(13(21)22)7(11(19)9(5)17)8-4(14(23)24)2-6(16)10(18)12(8)20/h1-2,15-20H,(H,21,22)(H,23,24) Key: MFTSECOLKFLUSD-UHFFFAOYAZ
- SMILES: O=C(O)c2cc(O)c(O)c(O)c2c1c(O)c(O)c(O)cc1C(=O)O

Properties
Chemical formula	C_{14}H_{10}O_{10}
Molar mass	338.224 g·mol^{−1}
- Except where otherwise noted, data are given for materials in their standard state (at 25 °C [77 °F], 100 kPa). verify (what is ?) Infobox references

Hexahydroxydiphenic acid is an organic compound with the formula [(HO)_{3}C_{6}HCO_{2}H]_{2}. It is the oxidatively coupled derivative of gallic acid It is a white solid, although samples are typically brown owing to oxidation.

== Occurrence ==
Ellagic acid.

Luteic acid and ellagic acid are the mono- and dilactone of hexahydroxydiphenic acid, respectively. Hexahydroxydiphenic acid is a component of some ellagitannins, such as casuarictin.

== See also ==
- Diphenic acid
