= Pomegranate ellagitannin =

Ellagitannins found in the pomegranate fruit

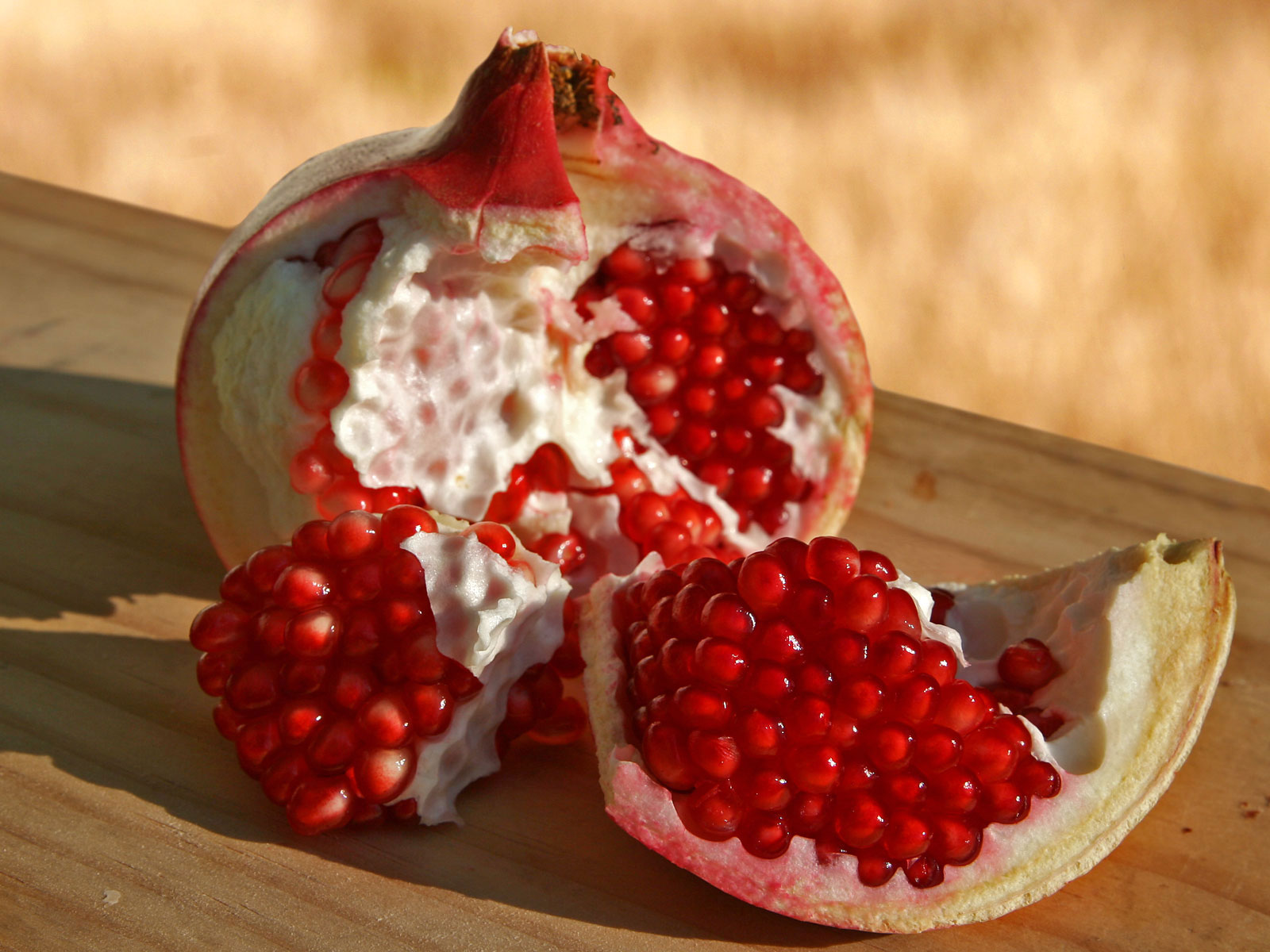
Pomegranate fruit, opened.

The pomegranate ellagitannins, which include punicalagin isomers, are ellagitannins found in the sarcotestas, rind (peel), bark or heartwood of the pomegranate fruit (Punica granatum).

== Chemistry ==
Punicalagins are not unique to pomegranate, as they are present in numerous species of the genus Terminalia, species chebula Retz., myriocarpa, catappa, and from Cistus salvifolius and Combretum molle.

== Dietary supplementation ==
A few dietary supplements and nutritional ingredients are available that contain extracts of whole pomegranate and/or are standardized to punicalagins, the marker compound of pomegranate. Extracts of pomegranate are also 'Generally Recognized As Safe' (GRAS) by the United States.

== List of compounds ==
=== Ellagitannins ===
- Pedunculagin, a compound found in the pericarp of the pomegranate (Punica granatum).
- Punicacortein A, a compound found in the bark of P. granatum and in Osbeckia chinensis
- Punicacortein B, a compound found in the bark of P. granatum
- Punicacortein C, a compound found in the bark of P. granatum
- Punicacortein D, a compound found in the bark and heartwood of P. granatum
- Punicafolin, a compound found in the leaves of Punica granatum
- Punigluconin, a compound found in the bark of P. granatum and in Emblica officinalis
- Punicalagin, a compound found in the pericarps of P. granatum
- Punicalin, a compound found in pomegranates or in the leaves of Terminalia catappa
- Granatin A, a compound found in the pericarp of P. granatum
- Granatin B, a compound found in the fruit of P. granatum
- Diellagic acid rhamnosyl (1→4) glucopyranoside
- 5-O-galloylpunicacortein D
- 2-O-galloylpunicalin
- Casuarinin, a compound found in the pericarp of P. granatum
- Gallagyldilactone, a compound found in the pericarp of P. granatum
- Corilagin, a compound found in the leaves of P. granatum and other species
- Strictinin, a compound found in the leaves of P. granatum

=== Other phenolics ===
- Ellagic acid, a constitutive compound of ellagitannins
- Gallagic acid, a compound found in many ellagitannins
- 1,2,4,6-tetra-O-galloyl-β-D-glucose, a compound found in the leaves of P. granatum
- 1,2,3,4,6-penta-O-galloyl-β-D-glucose, a compound found in the leaves of P. granatum and the common precursor of gallotannins and the related ellagitannins
- Brevifolin, a compound found in the leaves of P. granatum
- Brevifolin carboxylic acid, a compound found in the leaves of P. granatum
- 3,6-(R)-hexahydroxydiphenoyl-(α/β)-C-glucopyranose, a compound found in the leaves of P. granatum
- 1,2,6-tri-O-galloyl-β-C-glucopyranose, a compound found in the leaves of P. granatum
- 1,4,6-tri-O-galloyl-β-C-glucopyranose, a compound found in the leaves of P. granatum
- 3,4,8,9,10-pentahydroxydibenzo[b,d]pyran-6-one, a compound found in the leaves of P. granatum

== See also ==
- List of antioxidants in food
