= Punicacortein =

Punicacortein may refer to:

- Punicacortein A, an ellagitannin found in pomegranate
- Punicacortein B, an ellagitannin found in pomegranate
- Punicacortein C, an ellagitannin found in pomegranate
- Punicacortein D, an ellagitannin found in pomegranate
