= C48H28O30 =

The molecular formula C_{48}H_{28}O_{30} (molar mass: 1084.71 g/mol, exact mass: 1084.06654 u) may refer to:

- (α/β-)Punicalagin, an ellagitannin
- Punicacortein C, an ellagitannin
- Punicacortein D, an ellagitannin
- Terchebulin, an ellagitannin
- Isoterchebulin, an ellagitannin
