= C10H12O4 =

The molecular formula C_{10}H_{12}O_{4} may refer to:

- Acetosyringone, a phenolic natural product
- Atraric acid, a phenolic natural product
- Brevifolin, a bioactive compound found in pomegranate
- Cantharidin, a poisonous chemical compound secreted by many species of blister beetles
- 2-(4-Methoxyphenoxy)propionic acid, a natural carboxylic acid found in roasted coffee beans
- Sparassol, an antibiotic and antifungal chemical compound isolated from Sparassis crispa
- 3,4,5-Trimethoxybenzaldehyde, an organic compound and a biochemical
