= Hydrolysable tannin =

Class of chemical compounds

A hydrolysable tannin or pyrogallol-type tannin is a type of tannin that, on heating with hydrochloric or sulfuric acids, yields gallic or ellagic acids.

At the center of a hydrolysable tannin molecule, there is a carbohydrate (usually D-glucose but also cyclitols like quinic or shikimic acids). The hydroxyl groups of the carbohydrate are partially or totally esterified with phenolic groups such as gallic acid in gallotannins or ellagic acid in ellagitannins. Hydrolysable tannins are mixtures of polygalloyl glucoses and/or poly-galloyl quinic acid derivatives containing in between 3 up to 12 gallic acid residues per molecule.

Hydrolysable tannins are hydrolysed by weak acids or weak bases to produce carbohydrate and phenolic acids.

Examples of gallotannins are the gallic acid esters of glucose in tannic acid (C_{76}H_{52}O_{46}), found in the leaves and bark of many plant species.

Hydrolysable tannins can be extracted from different vegetable plants, such as chestnut wood (Castanea sativa), oak wood (Quercus robur, Quercus petraea and Quercus alba), tara pods (Caesalpinia spinosa), gallnuts (Quercus infectoria and Rhus semialata), myrobalan (Terminalia chebula), sumac (Rhus coriaria) and Aleppo gallnuts (Andricus kollari).

== Analysis ==
Gallic acid determination

50 mg of sample tannin in 5 ml 2N H_{2}SO_{4} are put into constricted test tubes and frozen. The tubes are vacuum-sealed and heated for 24 hours at 100 °C. The tubes are cooled, opened and the contents made up to 50 ml with water. Then 1.5 ml of freshly prepared 0.667% w/v rhodanine in methanol and 1 ml of sample are mixed. After exactly 5 min 1 ml of 0.5 N KOH solution is added. After 2.5 min the mixture is diluted to 25 ml with distilled water and 5–10 min later the absorbance at 520 nm is measured. The measured absorbance obeys the relationship:
A520= [0.13 × (mg of gallic acid) ] +0.03
Gallic acid is used as a standard and the data are based on experiments carried out in triplicate.

Ellagic acid determination

10 mg of samples tannin in 1 ml 2N H_{2}SO_{4} are put into constricted test tubes and frozen. The tubes are vacuum-waled and heated for 24 hours at 100 °C. Tubes were cooled, opened and the filtered content made up to 10 ml with pyridine. Then 1.1 ml of pyridine and l ml of sample are mixed in a dry test tube. After adding 0.10 ml of concentrated HCl and mixing, the sample is brought to 30 °C. The sample is quickly mixed after 0.10 ml of 1% (w/v) NaNO_{2} in water and the absorbance 538 nm is immediately recorded. After a 36 min incubating period at 30 °C, the absorbance is again recorded. The difference between the initial absorbance and the absorbance at 36 min (D A538) is proportional to the ellagic acid concentration. The measured absorbance obeys the relationship:
A538 = [0.03 × (mg of ellagic acid)] – 0.04
Ellagic acid is used as a standard and the data were based on experiments carried out in triplicate.

Alkaline hydrolysis

4.8 g sample tannin in 9 ml water are refluxed in 4.2 ml 40% NaOH for 6h at pH 12 - 13. Neutralization to pH = 6.8 - 7 is performed with 62% H_{2}SO_{4}.

HPLC determination

== Uses ==
Tannins, including gallo and ellagic acid (epigallitannins), are inhibitors of HIV replication. 1,3,4-Tri-O-galloylquinic acid, 3,5-di-O-galloyl-shikimic acid, 3,4,5-tri-O-galloylshikimic acid, punicalin, punicalagin inhibited HIV replication in infected H9 lymphocytes with little cytotoxicity. Two compounds, punicalin and punicacortein C, inhibited purified HIV reverse transcriptase.

Hydrolysable tannins have shown also potential antibacterial effects against Helicobacter pylori.

In the past few years, hydrolysable tannins have also been studied for their potential effects against cancer through different mechanisms.
