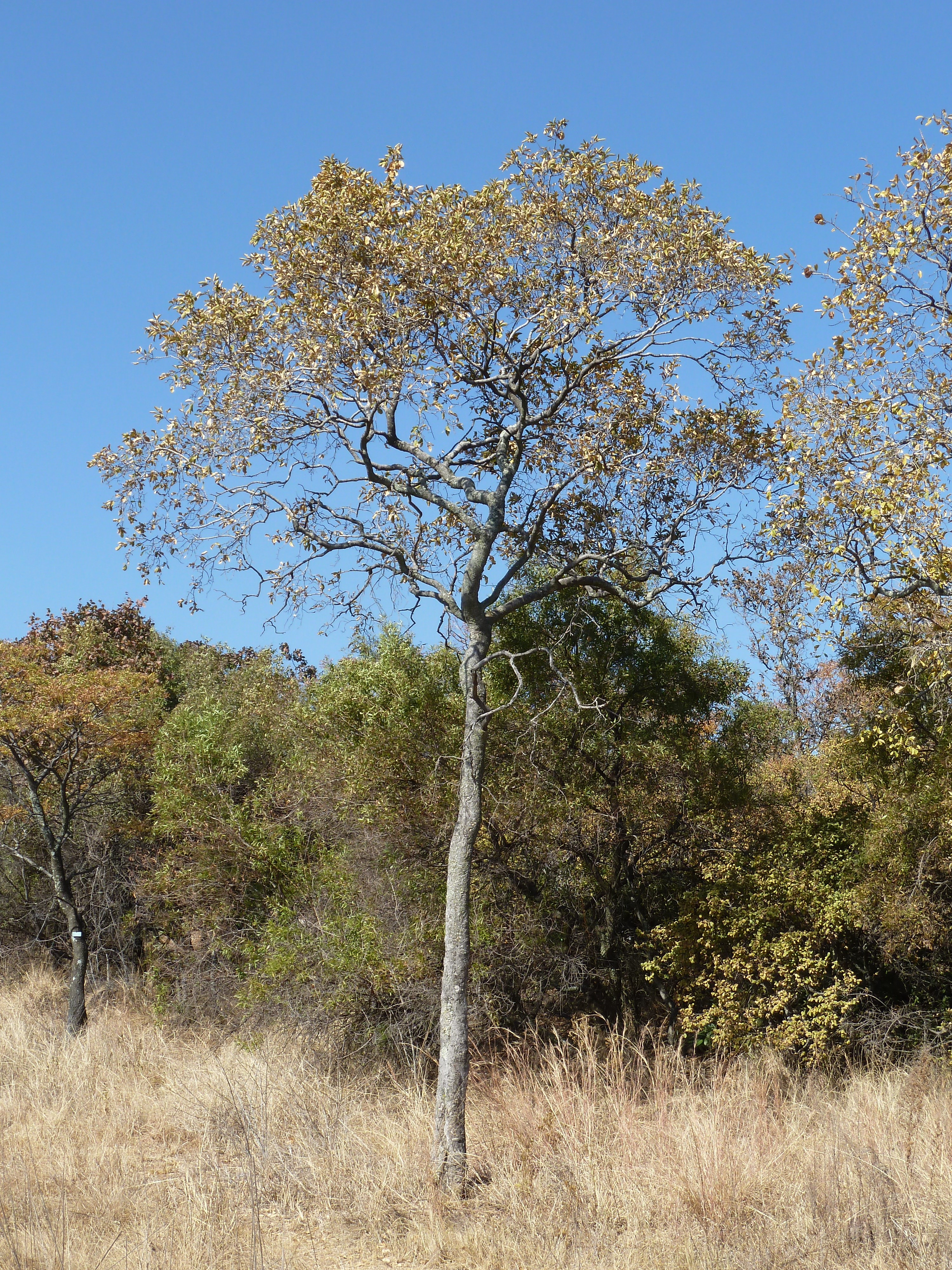
- habit, winter

Scientific classification
- Kingdom: Plantae
- Clade: Tracheophytes
- Clade: Angiosperms
- Clade: Eudicots
- Clade: Rosids
- Order: Myrtales
- Family: Combretaceae
- Genus: Combretum
- Species: C. molle

Binomial name
- Combretum molle R.Br. ex G.Don, Transactions of the Linnean Society of London. London 15:431. 1827

= Combretum molle =

Velvet bushwillow

Species of tree

Combretum molle, the velvet bushwillow, is a medium to large tree species in the genus Combretum found in western, eastern and southern Africa.

The larvae of Parosmodes morantii and Acalyptris molleivora feed on C. molle. It is recorded to contain antioxidants such as punicalagin, which is also found in the other Myrtale pomegranates (Punica granatum), a somewhat related plant. It also contains the 1alpha-hydroxycycloartenoid saponins mollic acid glucoside and mollic acid 3β-D-xyloside.

Extracts from the bark of C. molle show antibacterial and antifungal as well as in vitro antiprotozoal activities. Mollic acid glucoside shows cardiovascular effects.

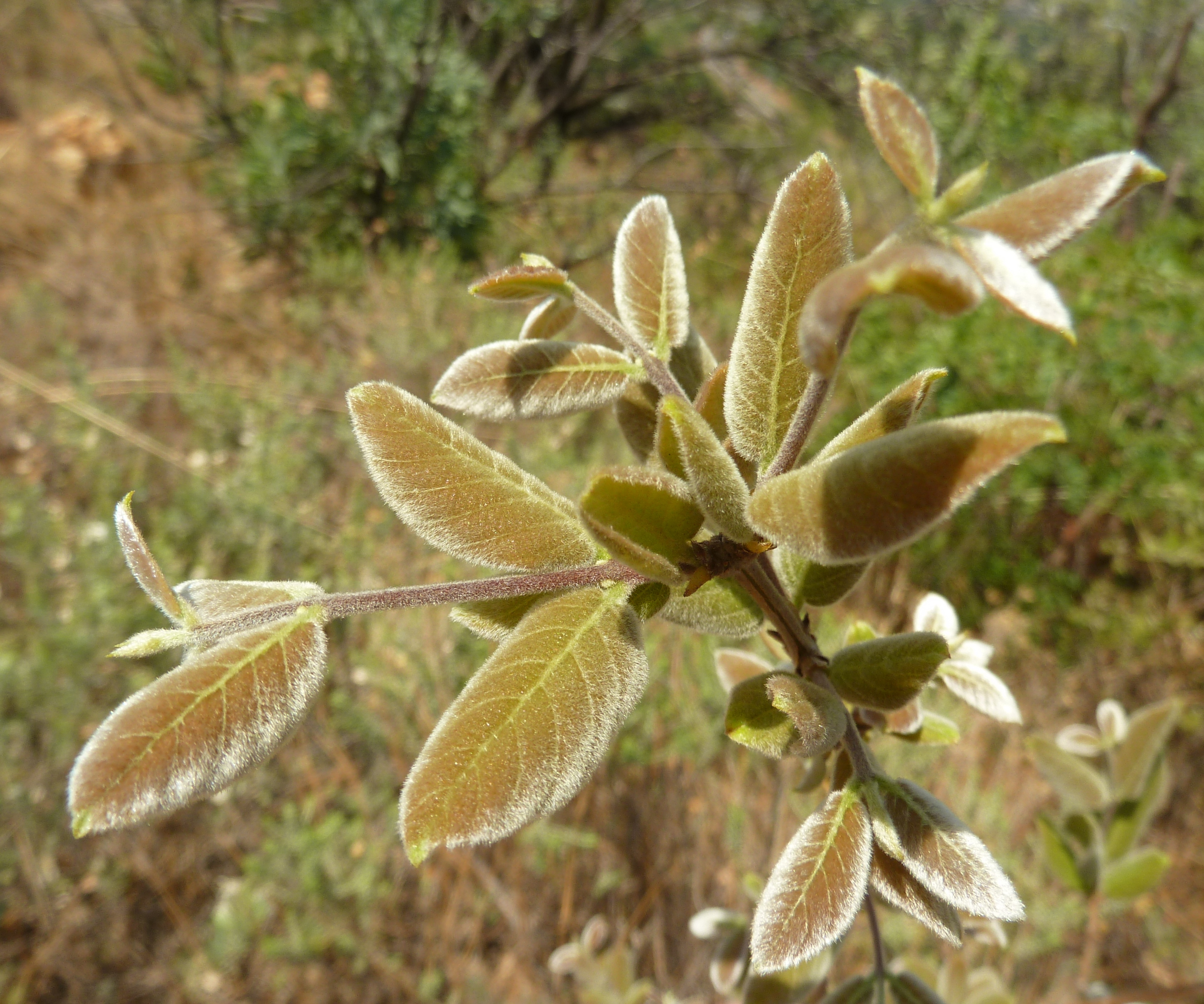
new flush

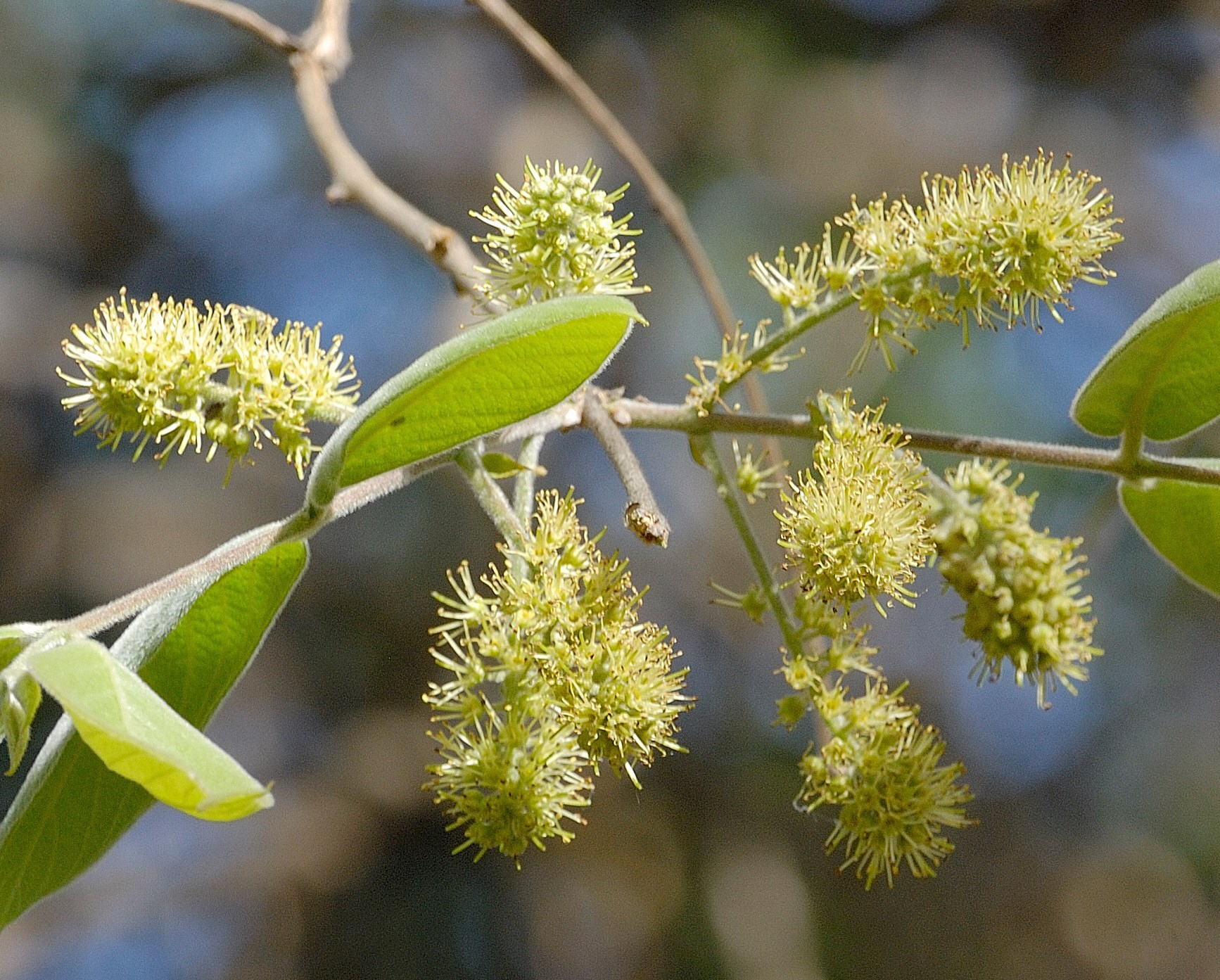
spring foliage and inflorescences

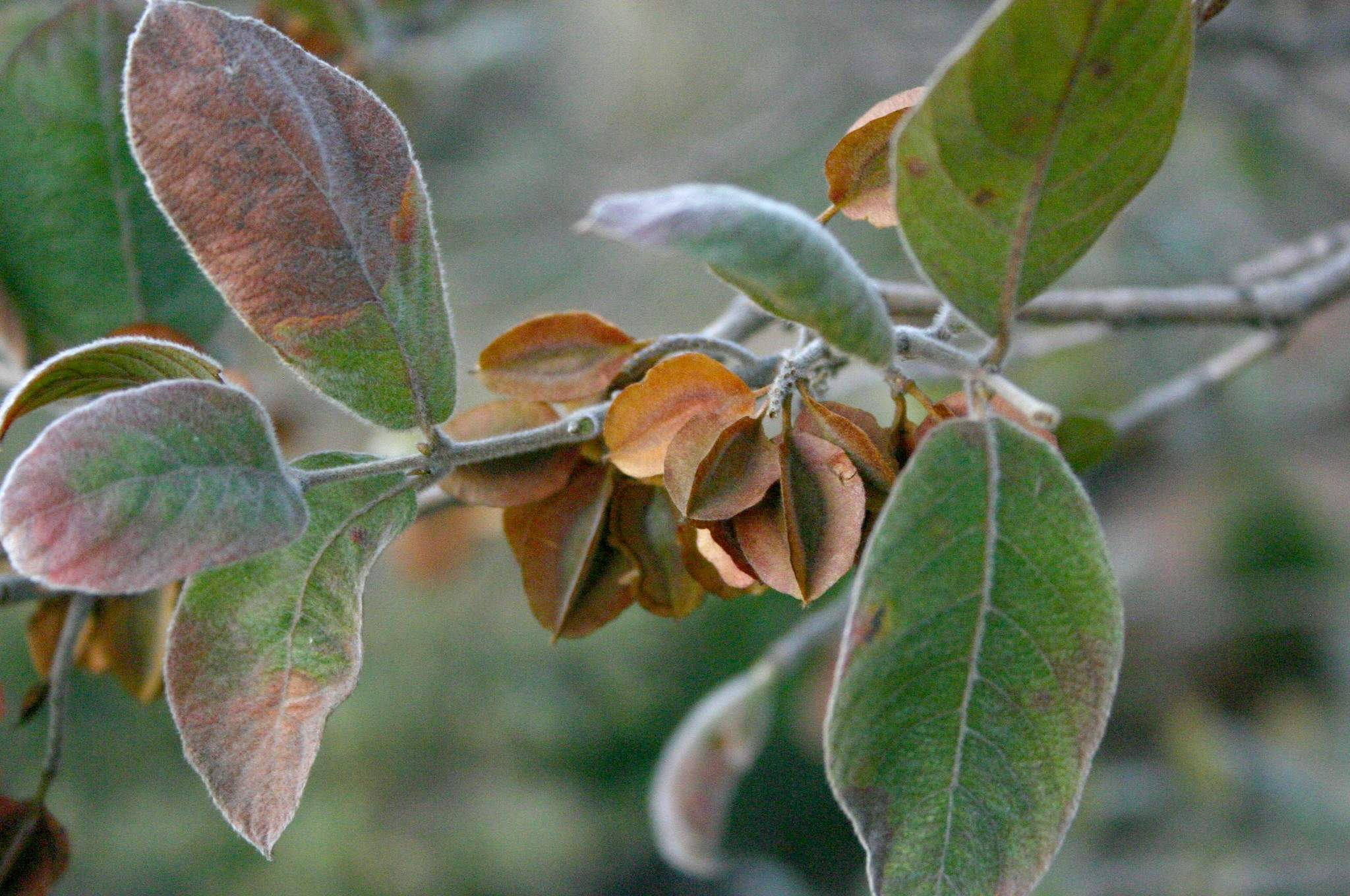
winter foliage and fruit

== See also ==
- List of Southern African indigenous trees and woody lianes
