= O. chinensis =

O. chinensis may refer to:

- Onthophagus chinensis, a scarab beetle species in the genus Onthophagus
- Osbeckia chinensis, a plant species
- Oscaria chinensis, a synonym for Primula sinensis, the Chinese primrose, a plant species

== See also ==
- Chinensis (disambiguation)
