= Alpha-D-xyloside xylohydrolase =

Identifiers
- EC no.: 3.2.1.177

Databases
- IntEnz: IntEnz view
- BRENDA: BRENDA entry
- ExPASy: NiceZyme view
- KEGG: KEGG entry
- MetaCyc: metabolic pathway
- PRIAM: profile
- PDB structures: RCSB PDB PDBe PDBsum
Search
- PMC: articles
- PubMed: articles
- NCBI: proteins

Alpha-D-xyloside xylohydrolase (EC 3.2.1.177, alpha-xylosidase) is an enzyme. This enzyme catalyses the following chemical reaction

Hydrolysis of terminal, non-reducing alpha-D-xylose residues with release of alpha-D-xylose.

The enzyme catalyses hydrolysis of a terminal, unsubstituted xyloside at the extreme reducing end of a xylogluco-oligosaccharide.
