= Acalyptris molleivora =

Scientific classification
- Kingdom: Animalia
- Phylum: Arthropoda
- Clade: Pancrustacea
- Class: Insecta
- Order: Lepidoptera
- Family: Nepticulidae
- Genus: Acalyptris
- Species: A. molleivora

Binomial name
- Acalyptris molleivora (Scoble, 1980)

Species of moth

Acalyptris molleivora is a species of moth of the family Nepticulidae. It was described by Scoble in 1980. It is known from South Africa (it was described from Pretoria).

The larvae feed on Combretum molle.
