= Brevifolin =

Names
- Preferred IUPAC name 1-(2-Hydroxy-4,6-dimethoxyphenyl)ethan-1-one
- Other names: 2-Hydroxy-4,6-dimethoxyacetophenone; Phloroacetophenone 2,4-dimethyl ether; Xanthoxylin; Xanthoxyline

Identifiers
CAS Number	90-24-4
3D model (JSmol)	Interactive image
ChEBI	CHEBI:10070
ChEMBL	ChEMBL450288
ChemSpider	60021
ECHA InfoCard	100.001.799
KEGG	C10726
PubChem CID	66654
UNII	Z8RSY5TZPA
CompTox Dashboard (EPA)	10237981
- InChI: InChI=1S/C10H12O4/c1-6(11)10-8(12)4-7(13-2)5-9(10)14-3/h4-5,12H,1-3H3 Key: FBUBVLUPUDBFME-UHFFFAOYSA-N; InChI=1/C10H12O4/c1-6(11)10-8(12)4-7(13-2)5-9(10)14-3/h4-5,12H,1-3H3 Key: FBUBVLUPUDBFME-UHFFFAOYAY
- SMILES: CC(=O)C1=C(C=C(C=C1OC)OC)O

Properties
Chemical formula	C_{10}H_{12}O_{4}
Molar mass	196.202 g·mol^{−1}
Appearance	solid
Melting point	85-88 °C

Hazards
- GHS labelling
Pictograms	(GHS07: Exclamation mark)
Signal word	Warning
Hazard statements	H315, H319, H335
Precautionary statements	P261, P264, P264+P265, P271, P280, P302+P352, P304+P340, P305+P351+P338, P319, P321, P332+P317, P337+P317, P362+P364, P403+P233, P405, P501
- Except where otherwise noted, data are given for materials in their standard state (at 25 °C [77 °F], 100 kPa). Infobox references

Brevifolin or xanthoxylin is a bioactive compound found in pomegranate. The pharmacological profile of brevifolin is reported similar to ellagic acid, particularly with regards to absorption, distribution, and elimination rates.
