= Punicacortein D =

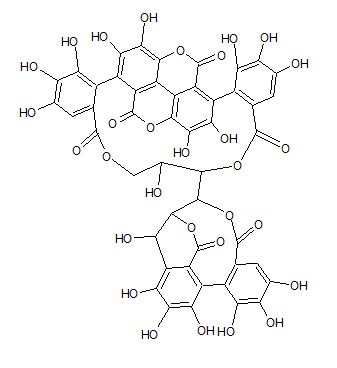
- Chemical structure of punicacortein D

Identifiers
CAS Number	103616-63-3
3D model (JSmol)	Interactive image
ChemSpider	23339998; 98612475
- InChI: InChI=1S/C48H28O30/c49-8-1-5-12(27(56)24(8)53)15-20-18-19-21(47(71)76-39(18)36(65)31(15)60)16(32(61)37(66)40(19)75-46(20)70)13-6(2-9(50)25(54)28(13)57)44(68)74-38(11(52)4-73-43(5)67)42-41-34(63)23-22(48(72)77-41)17(30(59)35(64)33(23)62)14-7(45(69)78-42)3-10(51)26(55)29(14)58/h1-3,11,34,38,41-42,49-66H,4H2/t11-,34-,38+,41+,42+/m0/s1 Key: FESAEKUFXJFTFG-UHFFFAOYNA-N
- SMILES: c12[C@@H]([C@H]3OC(=O)c1c(c1c(cc(c(c1O)O)O)C(=O)O[C@@H]3[C@@H]1OC(=O)c3c(c4c5c6c7c(oc5=O)c(c(c(c7c(=O)oc6c(c4O)O)c4c(c(c(cc4C(=O)OC[C@@H]1O)O)O)O)O)O)c(c(c(c3)O)O)O)c(c(c2O)O)O)O

Properties
Chemical formula	C_{48}H_{28}O_{30}
Molar mass	1084.68 g/mol
- Except where otherwise noted, data are given for materials in their standard state (at 25 °C [77 °F], 100 kPa). Infobox references

Punicacortein D is an ellagitannin, a type of phenolic compound. It is found in the bark and heartwood of Punica granatum (pomegranate). The molecule contains a gallagic acid component.
