= Punicalin =

- Chemical structure of punicalin

Names
- Other names 4,6-(S,S)-Gallagyl-D-glucose

Identifiers
CAS Number	65995-64-4
3D model (JSmol)	Interactive image
ChemSpider	28428695
PubChem CID	5388496
- InChI: InChI=1S/C34H22O22/c35-6-1-4-9(19(39)17(6)37)11-15-13-14-16(33(50)56-28(13)23(43)21(11)41)12(22(42)24(44)29(14)55-32(15)49)10-5(2-7(36)18(38)20(10)40)31(48)54-27-8(3-52-30(4)47)53-34(51)26(46)25(27)45/h1-2,8,25-27,34-46,51H,3H2/t8-,25-,26-,27-,34?/m1/s1 Key: IQHIEHIKNWLKFB-OBOTWMKHSA-N; InChI=1/C34H22O22/c35-6-1-4-9(19(39)17(6)37)11-15-13-14-16(33(50)56-28(13)23(43)21(11)41)12(22(42)24(44)29(14)55-32(15)49)10-5(2-7(36)18(38)20(10)40)31(48)54-27-8(3-52-30(4)47)53-34(51)26(46)25(27)45/h1-2,8,25-27,34-46,51H,3H2/t8-,25-,26-,27-,34?/m1/s1 Key: IQHIEHIKNWLKFB-OBOTWMKHBV
- SMILES: c1c2c(c(c(c1O)O)O)-c3c4c5c6c(c(c(c(c6oc4=O)O)O)-c7c(cc(c(c7O)O)O)C(=O)O[C@@H]8[C@@H](COC2=O)OC([C@@H]([C@H]8O)O)O)c(=O)oc5c(c3O)O

Properties
Chemical formula	C_{34}H_{22}O_{22}
Molar mass	782.52 g/mol
- Except where otherwise noted, data are given for materials in their standard state (at 25 °C [77 °F], 100 kPa). Infobox references

Punicalin is an ellagitannin. It can be found in Punica granatum (pomegranate) or in the leaves of Terminalia catappa, a plant used to treat dermatitis and hepatitis. It is also reported in Combretum glutinosum, all three species being Myrtales, the two last being Combretaceae.

It is a highly active carbonic anhydrase inhibitor.

== Chemistry ==
The molecule contains a gallagic acid component linked to a glucose.
