= 3,4,5-Trimethoxybenzaldehyde =

- 3,4,5-Trimethoxybenzaldehyde

Names
- Preferred IUPAC name 3,4,5-Trimethoxybenzaldehyde
- Other names 3,4,5-Trimethoxy-benzaldehyde; 3,4,5-Trimethoxy benzaldehyde

Identifiers
CAS Number	86-81-7
3D model (JSmol)	Interactive image
Beilstein Reference	395163
ChemSpider	6597
ECHA InfoCard	100.001.547
EC Number	201-701-6
PubChem CID	6858
UNII	WL86YD76N6
CompTox Dashboard (EPA)	DTXSID4058948
- InChI: InChI=1S/C10H12O4/c1-12-8-4-7(6-11)5-9(13-2)10(8)14-3/h4-6H,1-3H3 Key: OPHQOIGEOHXOGX-UHFFFAOYSA-N; InChI=1S/C10H12O4/c1-12-8-4-7(6-11)5-9(13-2)10(8)14-3/h4-6H,1-3H3
- SMILES: COC1=CC(=CC(=C1OC)OC)C=O

Properties
Chemical formula	C_{10}H_{12}O_{4}
Molar mass	196.202 g·mol^{−1}
Appearance	Light yellow solid
Density	1.367 g/cm^{3}
Melting point	73 °C (163 °F; 346 K)
Boiling point	337.6 °C (639.7 °F; 610.8 K)
Solubility in water	Slightly soluble
Solubility	Methanol: 0.1 g/mL
Vapor pressure	0.00113 mmHg

Hazards
- GHS labelling
Pictograms	(GHS07: Exclamation mark)
Signal word	Warning
Hazard statements	H302, H315, H319, H335
Precautionary statements	P261, P264, P264+P265, P270, P271, P280, P301+P317, P302+P352, P304+P340, P305+P351+P338, P319, P321, P330, P332+P317, P337+P317, P362+P364, P403+P233, P405, P501
Safety data sheet (SDS)	MSDS at Sigma Aldrich
- Except where otherwise noted, data are given for materials in their standard state (at 25 °C [77 °F], 100 kPa). Infobox references

3,4,5-Trimethoxybenzaldehyde is an organic compound and a biochemical. Within this class of compounds, the chemical is categorized as a trisubstituted aromatic aldehyde.

== Uses ==
3,4,5-Trimethoxybenzaldehyde can be used as an intermediate in the synthesis of some pharmaceutical drugs including trimethoprim, cintriamide, roletamide, trimethoquinol (aka tretoquinol), and trimazosin as well as some psychedelic phenethylamines.

More obscure but chemically relevant cases include CI 1020 [162256-50-0] & L48H37 [343307-76-6] & RL71 [1195795-93-7] & SL-314 [17537-28-9] (GO-Y016).

== Preparation ==
=== Industrial scale ===
For industrial applications the chemical is synthesized from p-cresol using aromatic substitution with bromine followed by nucleophilic substitution with sodium methoxide. Oxidation of the methyl group to an aldehyde can occur via various synthetic methods.

=== Laboratory scale ===
At the laboratory scale the chemical is conveniently synthesized from vanillin or from Eudesmic acid's Acyl chloride via Rosenmund reduction.
