= Punicacortein B =

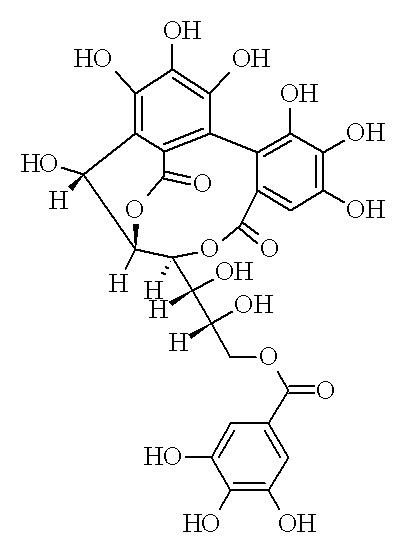
- Chemical structure of punicacortein B

Names
- IUPAC name (2R,3R)-3-[(14S,15S,19S)-2,3,4,7,8,9,19-Heptahydroxy-12,17-dioxo-13,16-dioxatetracyclo[13.3.1.0^{5,18}.0^{6,11}]nonadeca-1(18),2,4,6,8,10-hexaen-14-yl]-2,3-dihydroxypropyl 3,4,5-trihydroxybenzoate

Identifiers
CAS Number	103488-36-4
3D model (JSmol)	Interactive image
ChemSpider	16738326
PubChem CID	20056239
- InChI: Key: 1S/C27H22O18/c28-7-1-5(2-8(29)15(7)32)25(40)43-4-10(31)17(34)23-24-21(38)14-13(27(42)45-24)12(19(36)22(39)20(14)37)11-6(26(41)44-23)3-9(30)16(33)18(11)35/h1-3,10,17,21,23-24,28-39H,4H2/t10-,17-,21+,23+,24+/m1/s1; Key: JYPJJOONMBTTAR-MEZSAOBOSA-N
- SMILES: Oc1cc(cc(O)c1O)C(=O)OC[C@@H](O)[C@@H](O)[C@@H]5OC(=O)c2cc(O)c(O)c(O)c2c3c(O)c(O)c(O)c4[C@H](O)[C@@H]5OC(=O)c34

Properties
Chemical formula	C_{27}H_{22}O_{18}
Molar mass	634.43 g/mol
- Except where otherwise noted, data are given for materials in their standard state (at 25 °C [77 °F], 100 kPa). Infobox references

Punicacortein B is an ellagitannin, a polyphenol compound. It is found in the bark of Punica granatum (pomegranate).
