= Punicacortein A =

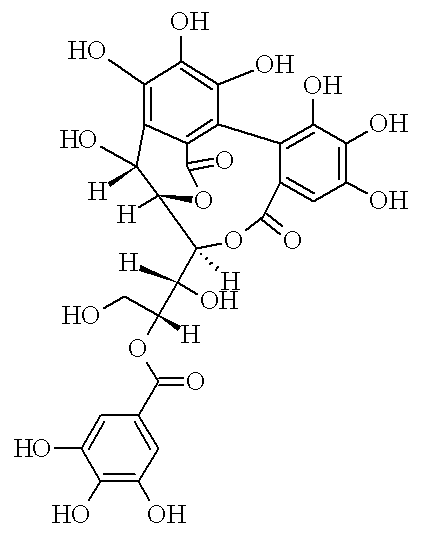
- Chemical structure of punicacortein A

Names
- IUPAC name (1R,2R)-1-[(14S,15S,19S)-2,3,4,7,8,9,19-Heptahydroxy-12,17-dioxo-13,16-dioxatetracyclo[13.3.1.0^{5,18}.0^{6,11}]nonadeca-1(18),2,4,6,8,10-hexaen-14-yl]-1,3-dihydroxy-2-propanyl 3,4,5-trihydroxybenzoate

Identifiers
CAS Number	unspec: 103488-35-3
3D model (JSmol)	Interactive image
ChemSpider	16738325
PubChem CID	14035447
CompTox Dashboard (EPA)	DTXSID601030153
- InChI: InChI=1S/C27H22O18/c28-4-10(43-25(40)5-1-7(29)15(32)8(30)2-5)17(34)23-24-21(38)14-13(27(42)45-24)12(19(36)22(39)20(14)37)11-6(26(41)44-23)3-9(31)16(33)18(11)35/h1-3,10,17,21,23-24,28-39H,4H2/t10-,17-,21+,23+,24+/m1/s1 Key: TXPZOUVETLGUPE-MEZSAOBOSA-N
- SMILES: Oc1cc(cc(O)c1O)C(=O)O[C@H](CO)[C@@H](O)[C@@H]5OC(=O)c2cc(O)c(O)c(O)c2c3c(O)c(O)c(O)c4[C@H](O)[C@@H]5OC(=O)c34

Properties
Chemical formula	C_{27}H_{22}O_{18}
Molar mass	634.43 g/mol
- Except where otherwise noted, data are given for materials in their standard state (at 25 °C [77 °F], 100 kPa). Infobox references

Punicacortein A is an ellagitannin, a polyphenol compound. It is found in the bark of Punica granatum (pomegranate) and in Osbeckia chinensis.
