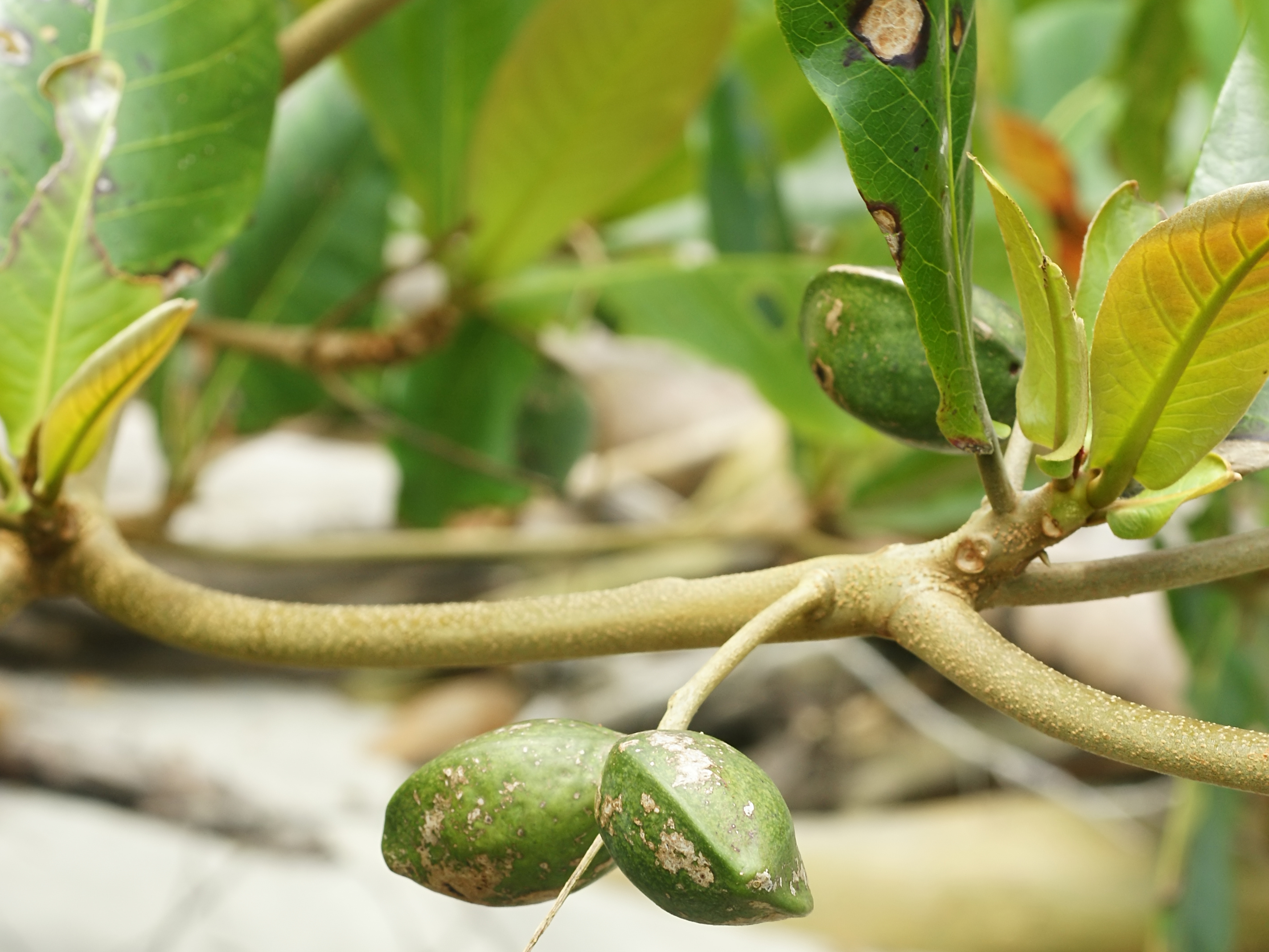

Conservation status
- Least Concern (IUCN 3.1)

Scientific classification
- Kingdom: Plantae
- Clade: Tracheophytes
- Clade: Angiosperms
- Clade: Eudicots
- Clade: Rosids
- Order: Myrtales
- Family: Combretaceae
- Genus: Terminalia
- Species: T. catappa

Binomial name
- Terminalia catappa L.

Synonyms
- 21 synonyms: Buceras catappa (L.) Hitchc.; Myrobalanus catappa (L.) Kuntze; Juglans catappa (L.) Lour.; Myrobalanus commersonii Kuntze; Myrobalanus rubrigemmis (Tul.) Kuntze; Terminalia burmanica King ex Prain; Terminalia catappa var. chlorocarpa Hassk.; Terminalia catappa var. macrocarpa Hassk.; Terminalia catappa var. pubescens Kurz; Terminalia catappa var. rhodocarpa Hassk.; Terminalia catappa var. subcordata (Humb. & Bonpl. ex Willd.) DC.; Terminalia intermedia Bertero ex Spreng.; Terminalia kydiana Roxb. ex Wall.; Terminalia latifolia Blanco; Terminalia mauritiana Blanco; Terminalia moluccana Lam.; Terminalia ovatifolia Noronha; Terminalia paraensis Mart.; Terminalia rubrigemmis Tul.; Terminalia subcordata Humb. & Bonpl. ex Willd.; Phytolacca javanica Osbeck

= Terminalia catappa =

Species of plant

Terminalia catappa is a large tropical tree in the leadwood tree family, Combretaceae, native to Asia, Australia, the Pacific, Madagascar and Seychelles. Common names in English include country almond, Indian almond, Malabar almond, sea almond, tropical almond, beach almond and false kamani. The species epithet catappa is derived from its Malay native name ketapang.

== Description ==
The tree grows to 35 metres (115 feet) tall, with an upright, symmetrical crown and horizontal branches. As the tree gets older, its crown becomes more flattened to form a spreading, vase shape. Its branches are distinctively arranged in tiers. The leaves are large and ovoid, 15–25 cm (6–9 3/4 in) long and 10–14 cm (4–5 1/2 in) broad; they have a glossy and leathery dark green surface like paper. They fall during the dry season; they turn pinkish-reddish or yellow-brown, due to pigments such as violaxanthin, lutein, and zeaxanthin.

The trees are monoecious, with distinct small male and female flowers on the same tree. Both are produced on axillary or terminal spikes, they are 1 cm (3/8 in) in diameter, white to greenish, and inconspicuous with no petals. Pollen grains measure about 30 microns.

The fruit is a drupe 5–7 cm (2–2 3/4 in) long and 3–5.5 cm (1 1/8–2 1/8 in) broad containing a single seed; it is green at first, then yellows and finally turns to red when ripe. The entire fruit is corky and light so it can be dispersed by water, but it can also be spread by bats that eat them. When the seed germinates, it unfolds the largest pair of foliar (leafy) cotyledons of any plant, up to 8.5 cm (3.3 in) wide by up to 3.5 cm (1.4 in) long.

== Distribution and habitat ==
The tree has been spread widely by humans, so the native range is uncertain. (Note: For example, on the sub-tropical Polynesian islands, it is unknown whether this species was introduced by humans prior to European contact or if the species predates human settlement on the islands where it is found.) It has long been naturalized in a broad belt extending from Africa to northern Australia and New Guinea through southeast Asia and Micronesia into the Indian subcontinent. More recently, the plant has been introduced to parts of the Americas. Until the mid-20th century, the tree had been used extensively in Brazilian urban landscaping, since being a rare case tropical deciduous, their fallen leaves would give a "European" flair to the street. This practice is currently abolished, and the "amendoeiras" are being replaced by native, evergreen trees.

== Cultivation and uses ==
T. catappa is widely grown in tropical regions of the world as an ornamental tree, grown for the deep shade its large leaves provide. The fruit is edible, tasting slightly acidic. When ripe, the seeds are edible raw or cooked and are the source of its 'almond' common names, but are small and difficult to extract.

The wood is red and solid, and has high water resistance; it has been used in Polynesia for making canoes. In Tamil, almond is known as nattuvadumai.

The leaves contain several flavonoids (such as kaempferol or quercetin), several tannins (such as punicalin, punicalagin or tercatin), saponins and phytosterols. Due to this chemical richness, the leaves (and the bark) are used in different herbal medicines for various purposes. For instance in Taiwan, fallen leaves are used as an herb to treat liver diseases. In Suriname, an herbal tea made from the leaves has been prescribed against dysentery and diarrhea. The leaves may contain agents for prevention of cancers (although they have no demonstrated anticarcinogenic properties) and antioxidants, as well as anticlastogenic characteristics. Extracts of T. catappa have shown activity against Plasmodium falciparum chloroquine (CQ)-resistant (FcB1) and CQ-sensitive (HB3) strains.

Keeping the leaves in an aquarium may lower the pH and heavy-metal content of the water. It has been used in this way by fish breeders for many years, and is active against some parasites and bacterial pathogens. It is also believed to help prevent fungus forming on the eggs of the fish. While common in hobby fishkeeping, this use of catappa leaves is not employed in commercial aquaculture.

== Gallery ==
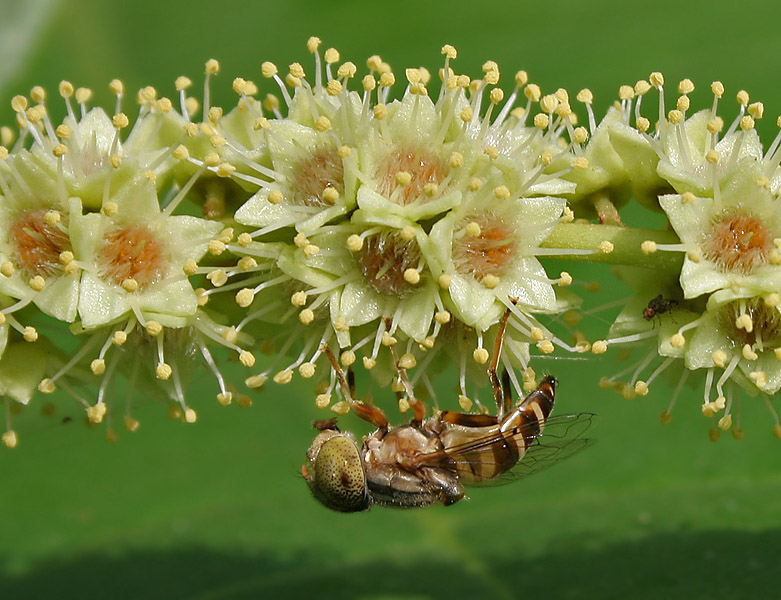
Inflorescence

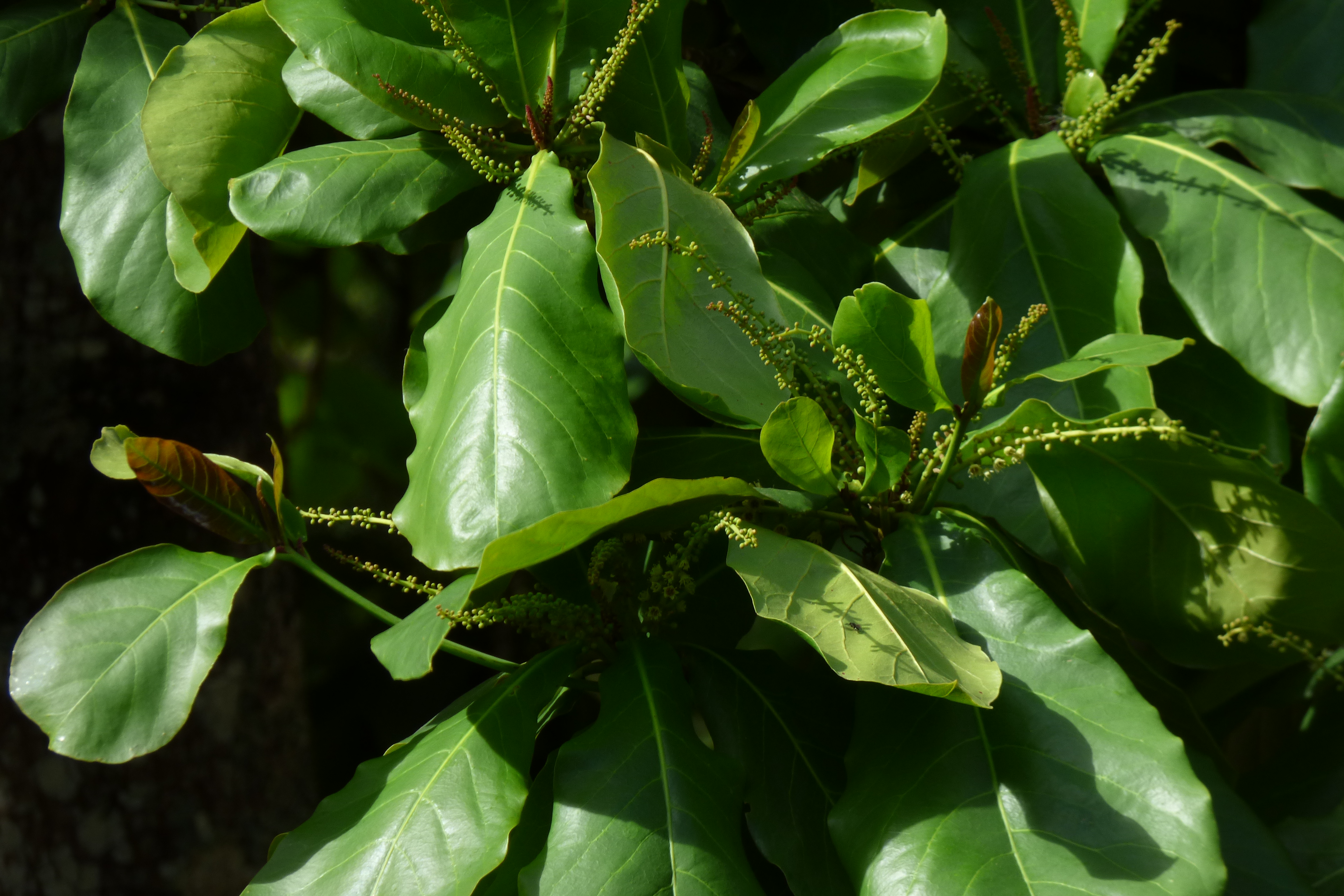
Foliage and immature inflorescences

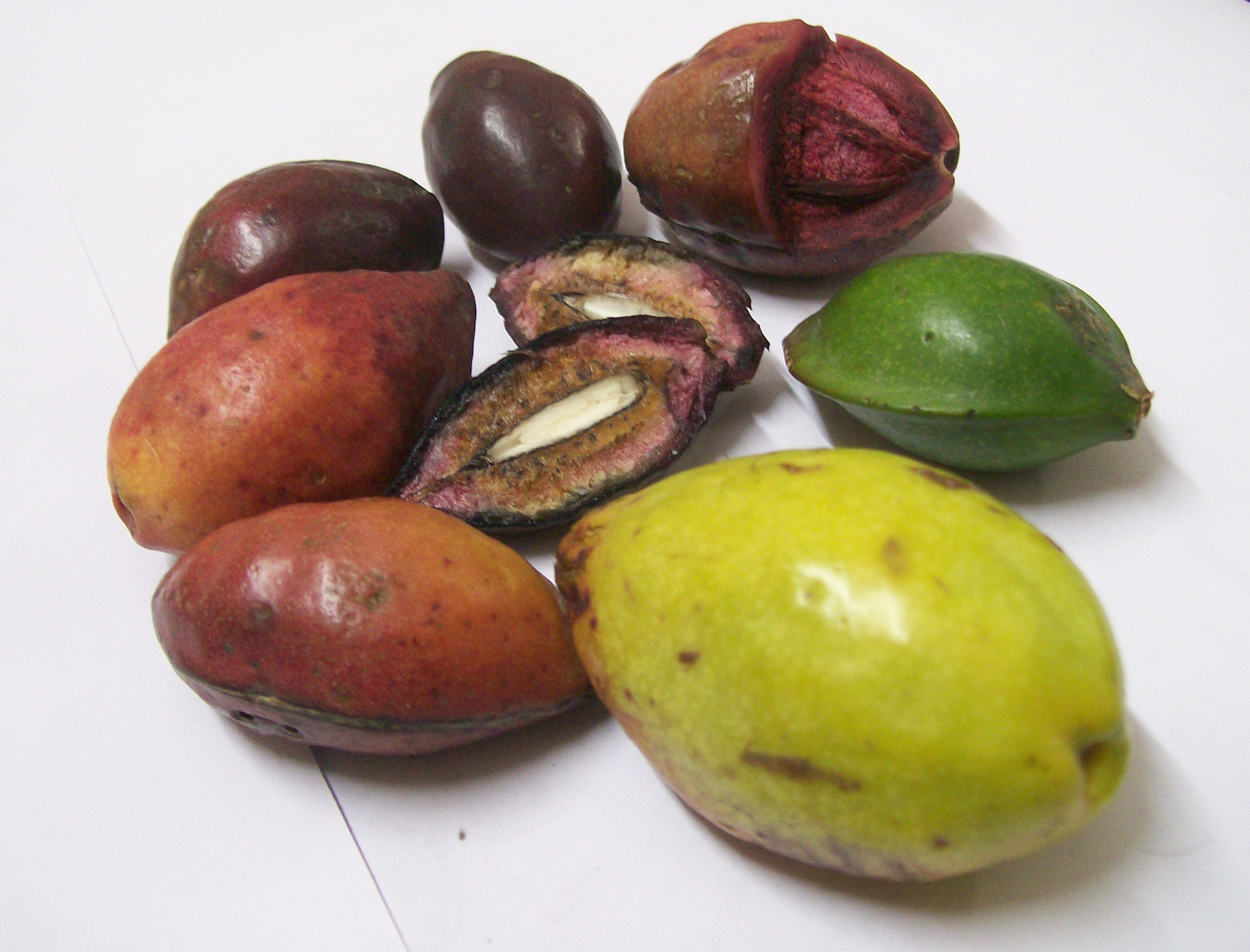
Fruits at various stages of ripeness: one cut open to reveal the edible kernel within the hard endocarp, and another partially opened to reveal the fleshy mesocarp surrounding the fibrous inner layers

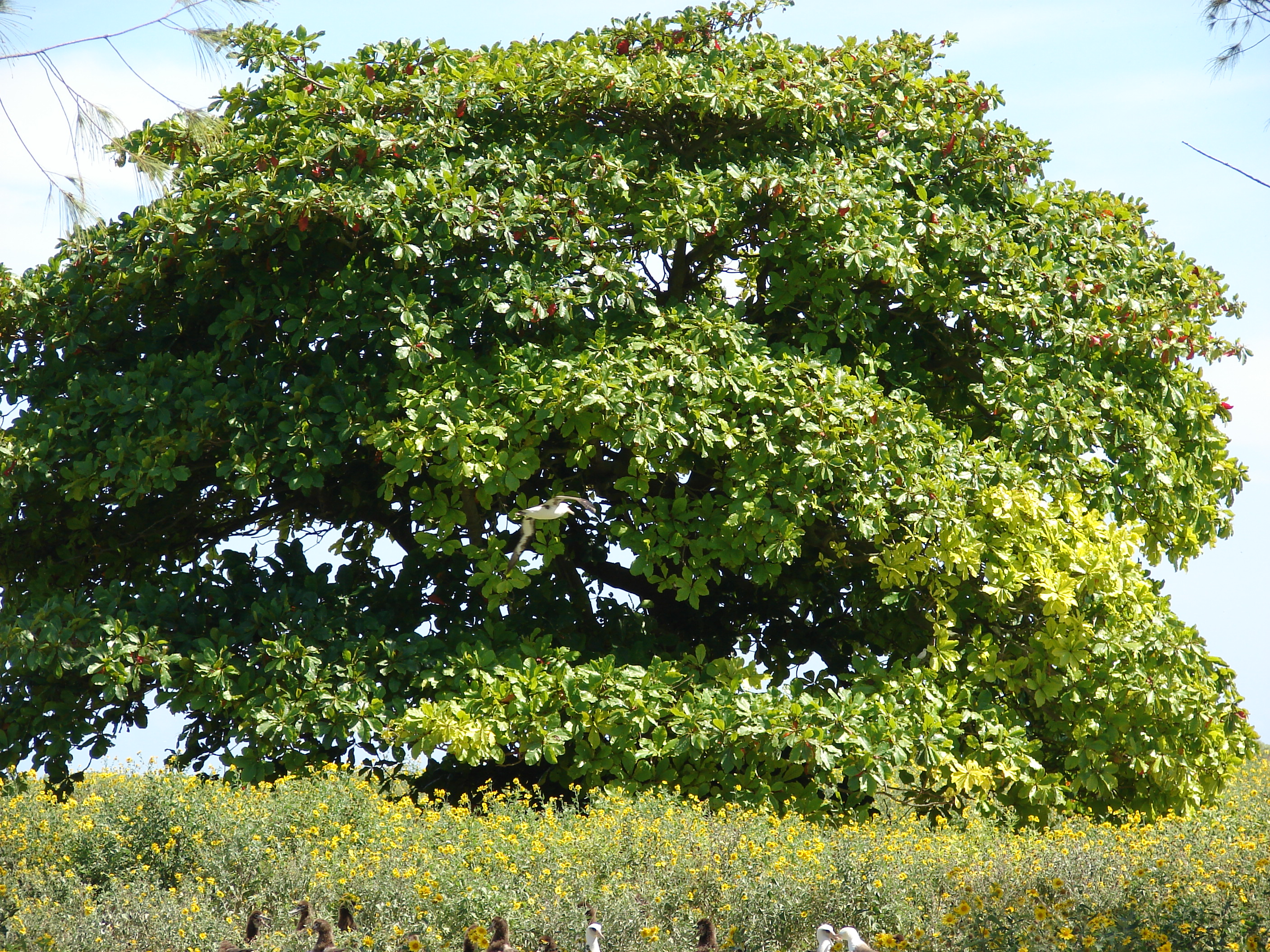
Tree canopy on Sand Island, Midway Atoll

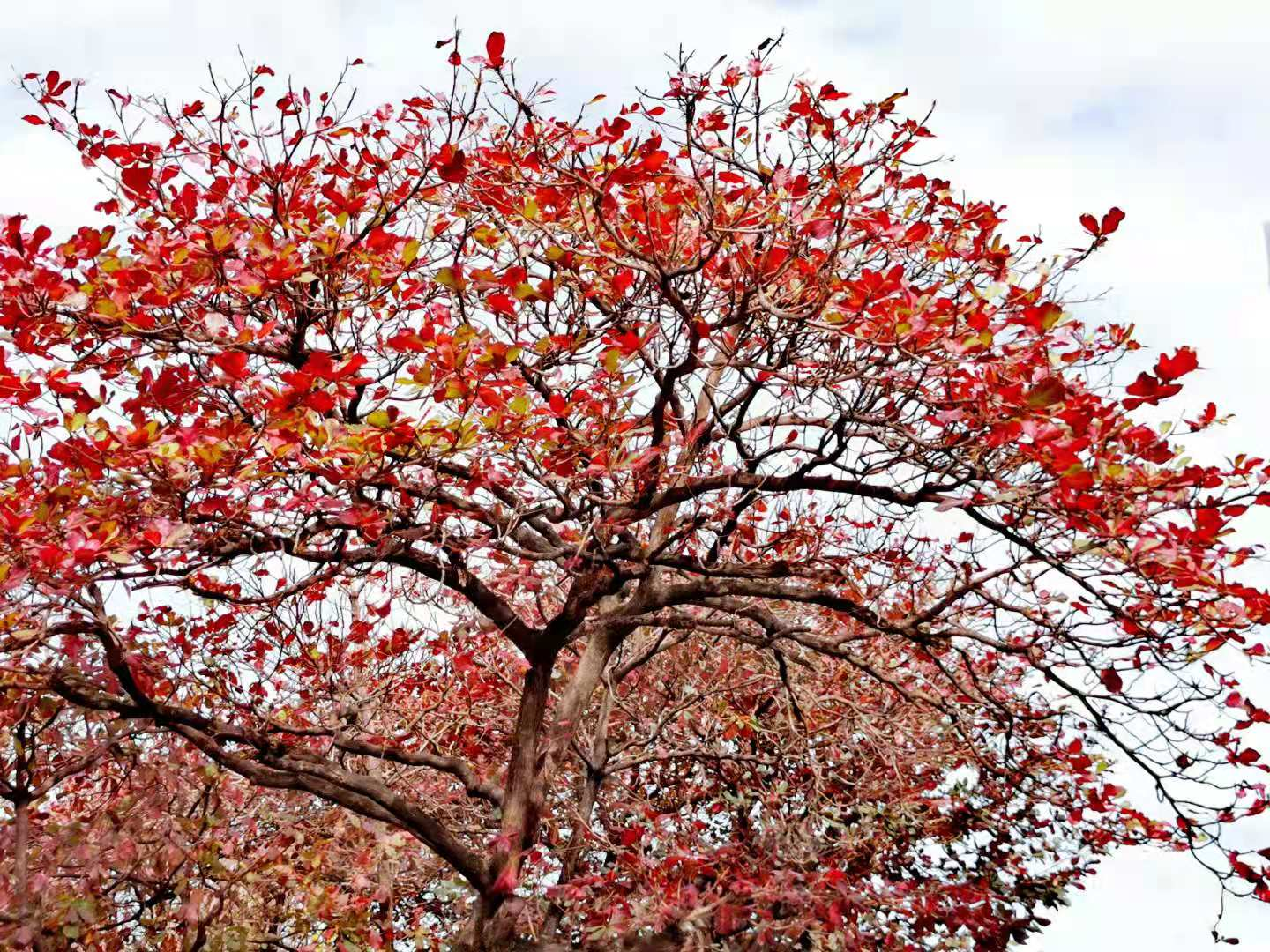
In winter
