= Gallagic acid =

- Chemical structure of gallagic acid

Names
- Preferred IUPAC name 2,2′-(1,2,6,7-Tetrahydroxy-4,9-dioxo-4,9-dihydro-[1]benzopyrano[5,4,3-cde][1]benzopyran-3,8-diyl)bis(3,4,5-trihydroxybenzoic acid)

Identifiers
CAS Number	65995-62-2
3D model (JSmol)	Interactive image
ChemSpider	57568038
PubChem CID	14754405
UNII	TSN85LPS4R
CompTox Dashboard (EPA)	DTXSID80563643
- InChI: InChI=1S/C28H14O18/c29-5-1-3(25(39)40)7(17(33)15(5)31)9-13-11-12-14(28(44)46-23(11)21(37)19(9)35)10(20(36)22(38)24(12)45-27(13)43)8-4(26(41)42)2-6(30)16(32)18(8)34/h1-2,29-38H,(H,39,40)(H,41,42) Key: ZASJRRFAYSNSHU-UHFFFAOYSA-N
- SMILES: Oc4c6c1c(c5c(=O)o6)c(oc(=O)c1c(c4O)-c(c(O)c2O)c(C(O)=O)cc2O)c(O)c(O)c5-c3c(C(O)=O)cc(O)c(O)c3O

Properties
Chemical formula	C_{28}H_{14}O_{18}
Molar mass	638.39 g/mol

Related compounds
Related compounds	Gallagic acid dilactone; Gallagyldilactone; Terminalin
- Except where otherwise noted, data are given for materials in their standard state (at 25 °C [77 °F], 100 kPa). verify (what is ?) Infobox references

Gallagic acid is a polyphenolic chemical compound that can be found in the ellagitannins, a type of tannin, found in Punica granatum (pomegranate). It is a building block of the corresponding tannin punicalagin, punicalin, punicacortein C and 2-O-galloyl-punicalin.
