= Punicalagin =

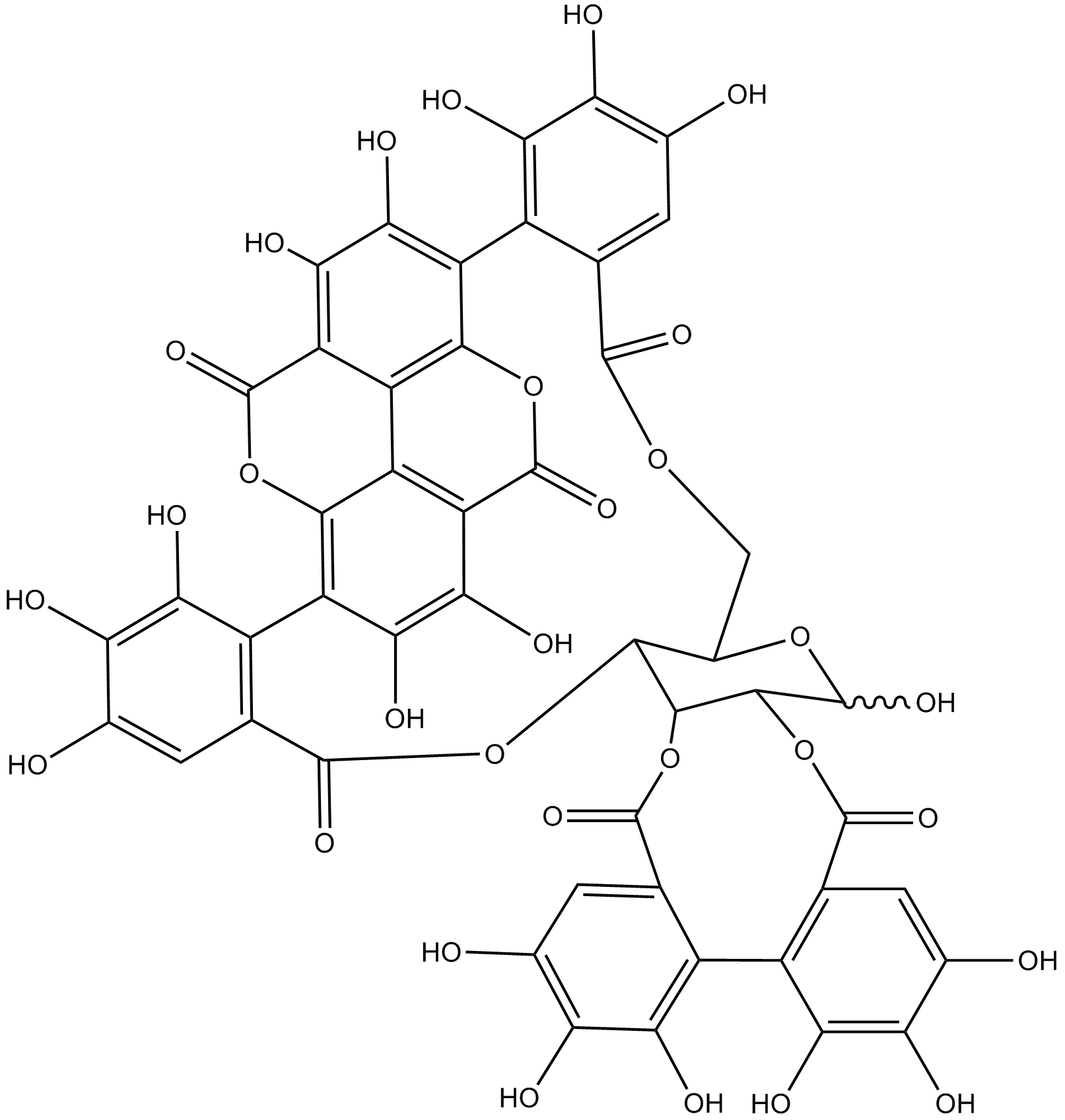
- Chemical structure of punicalagin

Names
- Other names 2,3-(S)-hexahydroxydiphenoyl-4,6-(S,S)-gallagyl-D-glucose α-punicalagin β-punicalagin

Identifiers
| CAS Number | 65995-63-3 |
| 3D model (JSmol) | Interactive image |
| ChEBI | CHEBI:167695 |
| ChEMBL | ChEMBL506814 |
| ChemSpider | 17286657; 29272136 |
| KEGG | C22601 |
| PubChem CID | 16129869 |
| UNII | 9S9XW36W2A |
| CompTox Dashboard (EPA) | DTXSID40894768 |
- InChI: InChI=1S/C48H28O30/c49-10-1-6-17(31(59)27(10)55)19-23-21-22-24(47(70)76-38(21)35(63)33(19)61)20(34(62)36(64)39(22)75-46(23)69)18-9(4-13(52)28(56)32(18)60)43(66)74-37-14(5-72-42(6)65)73-48(71)41-40(37)77-44(67)7-2-11(50)25(53)29(57)15(7)16-8(45(68)78-41)3-12(51)26(54)30(16)58/h1-4,14,37,40-41,48-64,71H,5H2 Key: ZJVUMAFASBFUBG-UHFFFAOYSA-N
- SMILES: C1C(C(OC(=O)C2=CC(=C(C(=C2C3=C(C(=C4C5=C3C(=O)OC6=C(C(=C(C7=C(C(=C(C=C7C(=O)O1)O)O)O)C(=C56)C(=O)O4)O)O)O)O)O)O)O)C8C(OC(=O)C9=CC(=C(C(=C9C1=C(C(=C(C=C1C(=O)O8)O)O)O)O)O)O)C=O)O

Properties
| Chemical formula | C_{48}H_{28}O_{30} |
| Molar mass | 1084.71 g/mol |
- Except where otherwise noted, data are given for materials in their standard state (at 25 °C [77 °F], 100 kPa). verify (what is ?) Infobox references

Punicalagin (Pyuni-cala-jen) is an ellagitannin, a type of phenolic compound. It is occurs as alpha and beta isomers in pomegranates (Punica granatum), Terminalia catappa, Terminalia myriocarpa, and in Combretum molle, the velvet bushwillow, a plant species found in South Africa. These three genera are all Myrtales and the last two are both Combretaceae.

== See also ==
- Ellagic acid
- Punicic acid
