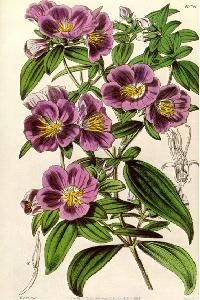
- Osbeckia chinensis, drawn by Osbeck

Scientific classification
- Kingdom: Plantae
- Clade: Tracheophytes
- Clade: Angiosperms
- Clade: Eudicots
- Clade: Rosids
- Order: Myrtales
- Family: Melastomataceae
- Genus: Osbeckia
- Species: O. chinensis

Binomial name
- Osbeckia chinensis L.

Subspecies
- Osbeckia chinensis var. chinensis; Osbeckia chinensis var. angustifolia

= Osbeckia chinensis =

Species of flowering plant

Osbeckia chinensis is a plant species in the genus Osbeckia.

Osbeckia chinensis contains the ellagitanin punicacortein A.

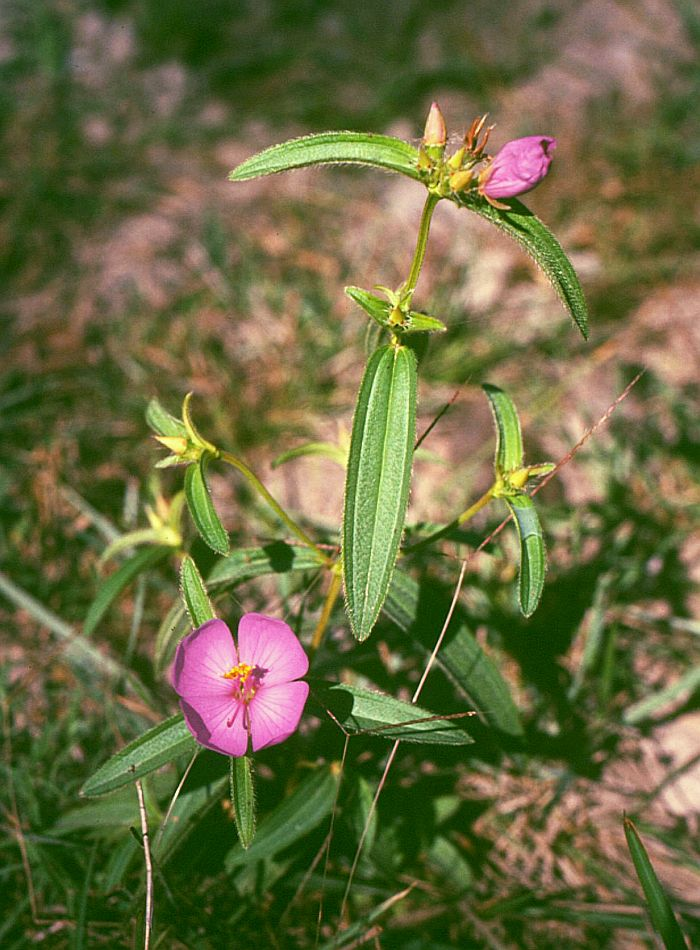
Osbeckia chinensis var. chinensis, Melastomataceae - Kambodscha/Cambodia, ca. 10 km SE Voen Sai (Prov. Ratanakkiri)
