= Xyloside =

Type of glycoside derived from the sugar xylose

A xyloside is a type of glycoside derived from the sugar xylose.

Proteoglycan (PG) synthesis is initiated by the transfer of D-xylose from UDP-xylose to a serine residue in core proteins. This natural primer acts as a template for the assembly of heparin sulfate, heparin, chondroitin sulfate, and dermatan sulfate side chains, depending on the tissue. However, in 1973 it was determined that synthetic B-D-xylosides can prime glycosaminoglycan (GAG) synthesis by substituting for the core xylosylated protein.

Many Beta-D-xylosides have been studied for use as xylose primes with varying results.

1. Priming requires the Beta-anomer of xylose.
2. Priming activity correlates with the activity of the aglycone (cite).
3. The most active xyloside primers contain O or S in glycosidic linkage.
4. Priming is dose dependent.
5. Beta-D-xylosides prime GAGs in most cells.
6. Most of the material created from Beta-D-xylosides priming is excreted into the growth media.
7. Beta-D-xylosides prime chondroitin sulfate or dermatan sulfate whereas priming of heparin sulfate poorly, except with the appropriate aglycones.

Beta-D-xylosides consist of a xylose in beta linkage to an aglycone. The aglycone often consists of a hydrophobic compound which aids in carrying the sugar moiety to the golgi membrane where GAG synthesis takes place.

== List of xylosides ==
- 2-naphthol-B-D-xyloside
