= Punicacortein C =

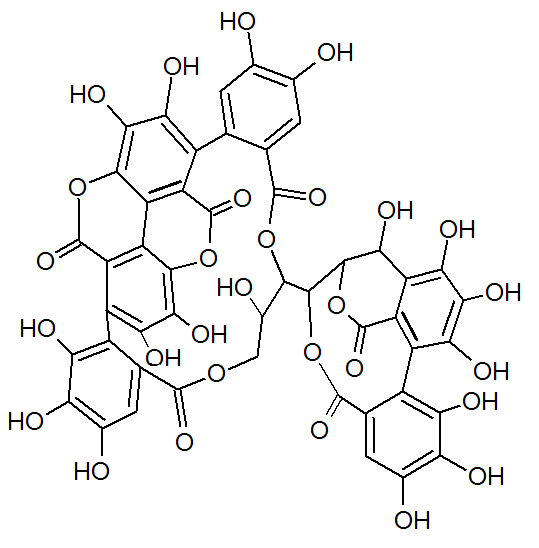
- Chemical structure of punicacortein C

Identifiers
CAS Number	103488-37-5
3D model (JSmol)	Interactive image
ChemSpider	23339998
PubChem CID	16129720
CompTox Dashboard (EPA)	DTXSID001316860
- InChI: InChI=1S/C48H28O30/c49-8-1-5-12(27(56)24(8)53)15-20-18-19-21(47(71)76-39(18)36(65)31(15)60)16(32(61)37(66)40(19)75-46(20)70)13-6(2-9(50)25(54)28(13)57)44(68)74-38(11(52)4-73-43(5)67)42-41-34(63)23-22(48(72)77-41)17(30(59)35(64)33(23)62)14-7(45(69)78-42)3-10(51)26(55)29(14)58/h1-3,11,34,38,41-42,49-66H,4H2 Key: FESAEKUFXJFTFG-UHFFFAOYSA-N
- SMILES: C1C(C(OC(=O)C2=CC(=C(C(=C2C3=C(C(=C4C5=C3C(=O)OC6=C(C(=C(C7=C(C(=C(C=C7C(=O)O1)O)O)O)C(=C56)C(=O)O4)O)O)O)O)O)O)O)C8C9C(C1=C(C(=C(C(=C1C(=O)O9)C1=C(C(=C(C=C1C(=O)O8)O)O)O)O)O)O)O)O

Properties
Chemical formula	C_{48}H_{28}O_{30}
Molar mass	1084.68 g/mol
- Except where otherwise noted, data are given for materials in their standard state (at 25 °C [77 °F], 100 kPa). Infobox references

Punicacortein C is an ellagitannin, a phenolic compound. It is found in the bark of Punica granatum (pomegranate). The molecule contains a gallagic acid component.
