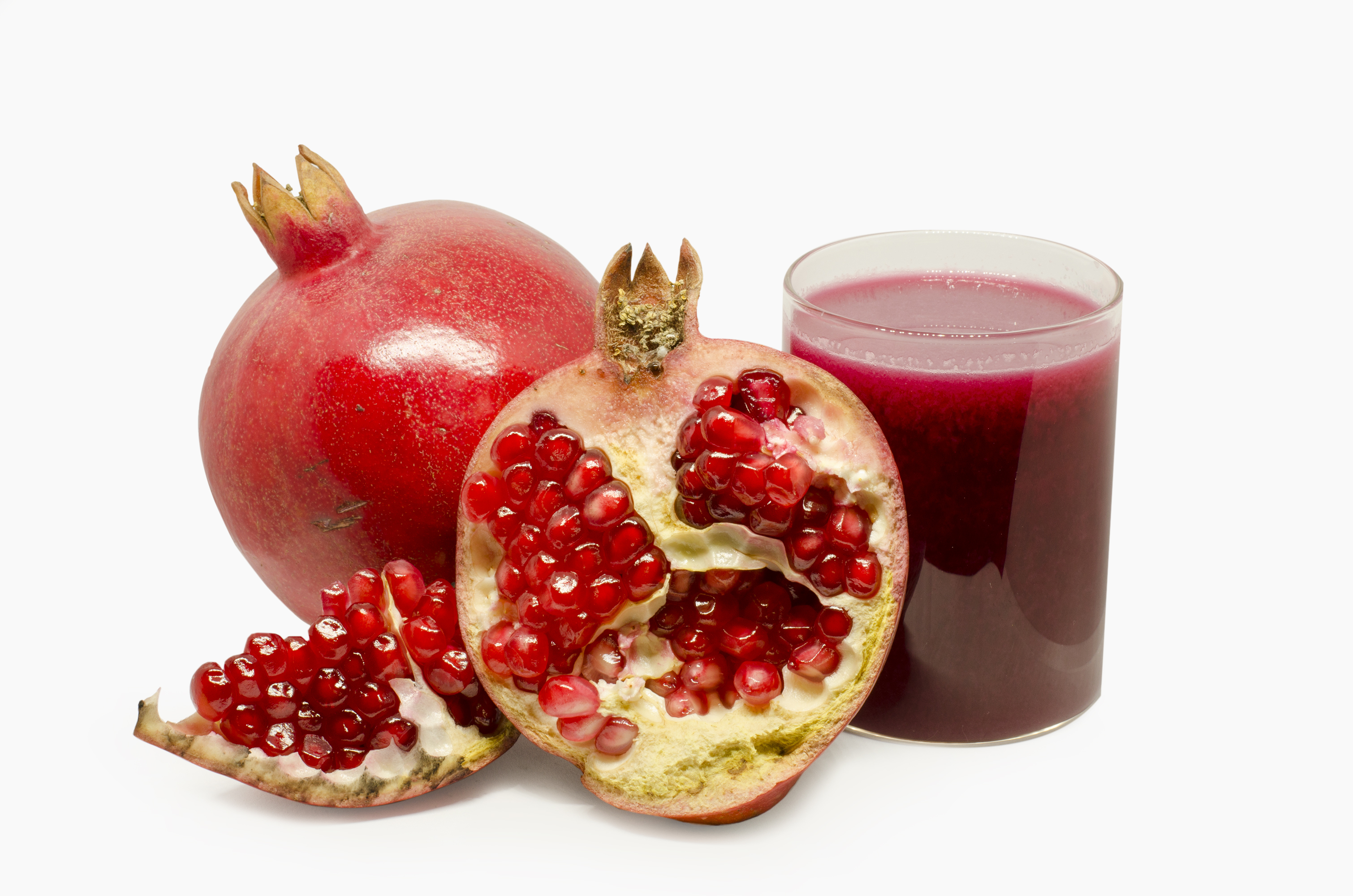
- Fruit of Punica granatum split open to reveal clusters of seeds with sarcotesta on the inside, and a glass of juice

Conservation status
- Least Concern (IUCN 3.1)

Scientific classification
- Kingdom: Plantae
- Clade: Tracheophytes
- Clade: Angiosperms
- Clade: Eudicots
- Clade: Rosids
- Order: Myrtales
- Family: Lythraceae
- Genus: Punica
- Species: P. granatum

Binomial name
- Punica granatum L.

Synonyms
- Granatum punicum St.-Lag.; Punica florida Salisb.; Punica grandiflora hort. ex Steud.; Punica nana L.; Punica spinosa Lam.; Rhoea punica St.-Lag.

= Pomegranate =

Fruit-bearing deciduous shrub

The pomegranate (Punica granatum) is a fruit-bearing, deciduous shrub or tree in the family Lythraceae, subfamily Punicoideae, that grows to between 1.5 and 5 metres (4.9 and 16.4 ft) tall. Rich in symbolic and mythological associations in many cultures, and mentioned in the Old Testament, it originated in the region spanning the Caucasus and the Iranian plateau—including modern-day Iran, Turkmenistan and Afghanistan—and down to Pakistan. Pomegranates were first domesticated by ancient Iranians in the Iranian plateau and nearby regions about 5,000 years ago. They are extensively cultivated for their fruit.

Pomegranate was exported from the Iranian plateau to other parts of Asia including all over the Middle East, Turkey, and India, as well as parts of Africa and Europe. It was also introduced into Spanish America in the late 16th century and into California by Spanish settlers in 1769.

Although the pomegranate is indigenous to Iran and its nearby regions, it is also nowadays cultivated across West Asia, South Asia, Central Asia, north and Sub-Saharan Africa, the drier parts of Southeast Asia, the Mediterranean basin, United States and Chile. The fruit is typically in season in the Northern Hemisphere from September to February, and in the Southern Hemisphere from March to May.

Pomegranate molasses is a key ingredient in traditional Persian cuisine, where it is used to add a rich sweet-sour flavour to dishes such as stews, sauces, and marinades, most notably in classic recipes like fesenjān, kabab torsh and zeytoon parvardeh. The pomegranate and its juice are variously used in baking, cooking, juice blends, garnishes, nonalcoholic drinks, and cocktails.

== Etymology ==
The name pomegranate derives from Old French pomme-grenade respectively from medieval Latin pōmum, apple and grānātum, seeded. Descendants of pomum in various Romance languages applied to any small roundish holdable items like the apple (see also 'pome'): a potato in French was the pomme de terre ("earth apple") while tomatoes were first described in Italian literature by Pietro Andrea Mattioli in 1554 as pomi d'oro ("golden apples") evolving into pomodoro; present Romance languages name this fruit however with descendants of malum granatum (e.g. Italian melagrana) as used by Roman writers like Pliny the Elder.

The Old French pomme-grenade evolved into two doublets: the modern French grenade, the namesake for the military grenade, and gem 'garnet' metathesized from Old French grenat by a connection to pomum granatum describing the appearance akin to "dark red colour" of pomegranate pulp. OF pomme-grenade was also calqued in early English as "apple of Granada" that today survives only in heraldic blazons.

Pomegranates were colloquially called "wineapples" or "wine-apples" in Ireland, although this term has fallen out of use save for a few pockets, like the Moore Street open-air market in central Dublin.

== Description ==
The pomegranate is a shrub or small tree growing 1.5 to 5 m (5 to 16 ft) high, with multiple spiny branches. It is long-lived, with some specimens in France surviving for 200 years. The leaves are opposite or subopposite, glossy, narrow oblong, entire, 1.9–5 cm (0.7–2.0 in) long, and 0.8–1.5 cm (0.3–0.6 in) broad.

The flowers are bright red or white, and 3 cm (1 1/4 in) or more in diameter, with three to seven petals. Some fruitless cultivars are grown for the flowers alone. The flower's anthers close around the stigma until maturity, and the ovaries are divided internally into compartments or locules of many suspended ovules covered by a septum. Pomegranate flowers are pollinated by Eastern and Western honey bees, bumblebees, carpenter ants and lemon butterflies.

The pomegranate fruit husk is red-purple with an outer, hard pericarp, and an inner, spongy mesocarp (white "albedo"), which comprises the fruit's inner wall where seeds attach. Membranes of the mesocarp are organised as nonsymmetric chambers that contain seeds which are embedded without attachment to the mesocarp, also a result of fertilisation of the divided ovary. Pomegranate seeds are characterised by having sarcotesta, thick fleshy seed coats derived from the integuments or outer layers of the ovule's epidermal cells. The number of seeds in a pomegranate can vary from 200 to about 1,400. Botanically, the fruit is a berry with edible seeds and pulp produced from the ovary of a single flower. The fruit is variable in size, from 2–8 cm (1–3 in) in diameter in wild plants (to 12 cm (4.7 in) in some cultivars) with a rounded shape and thick, reddish husk. In mature fruit, the juice obtained by compressing the seeds yields a tart flavour due to low pH (4.4) and high contents of polyphenols, which may cause a red indelible stain on fabrics. The pigmentation of pomegranate juice primarily results from the presence of anthocyanins and ellagitannins.

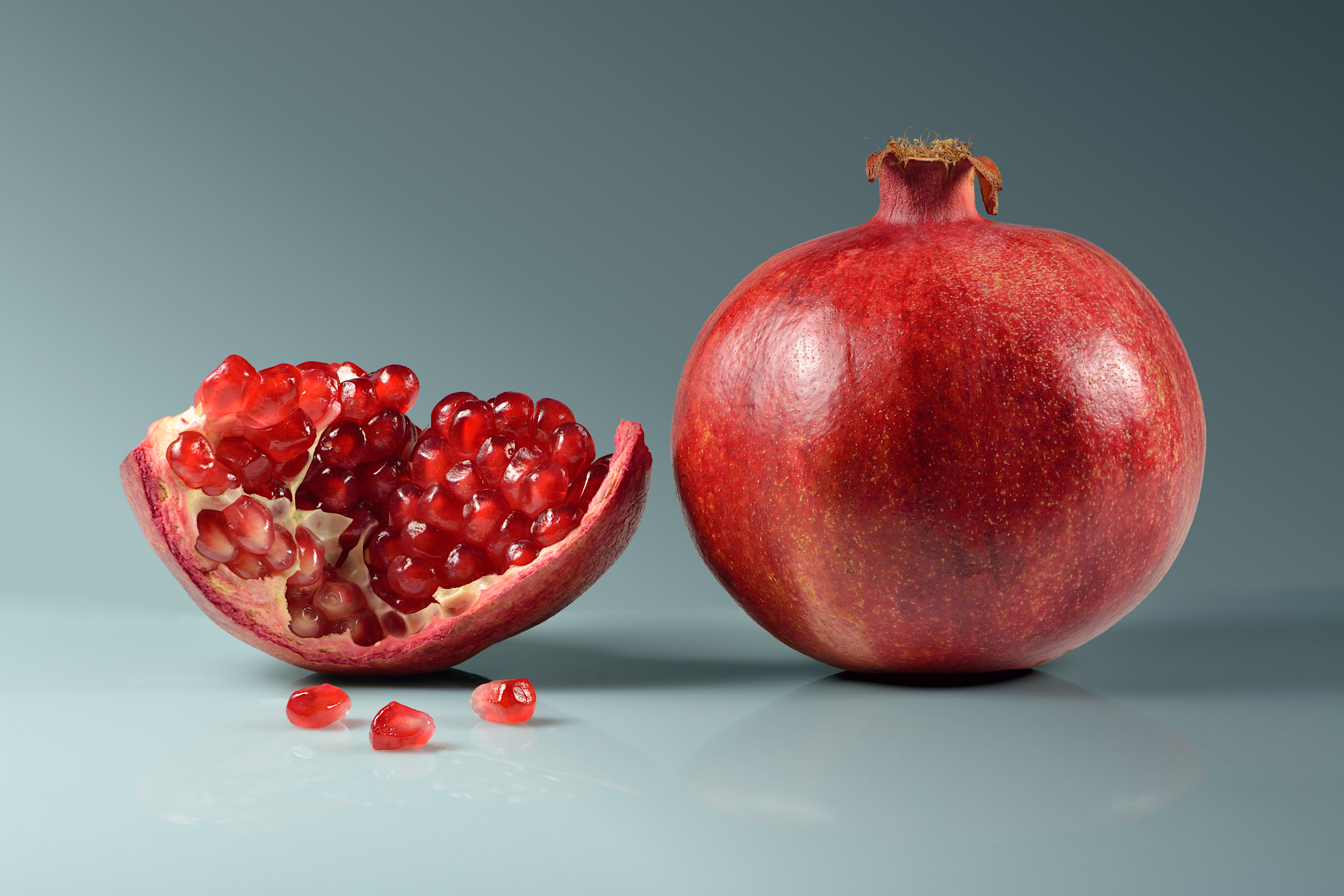
Whole pomegranate and piece with seeds

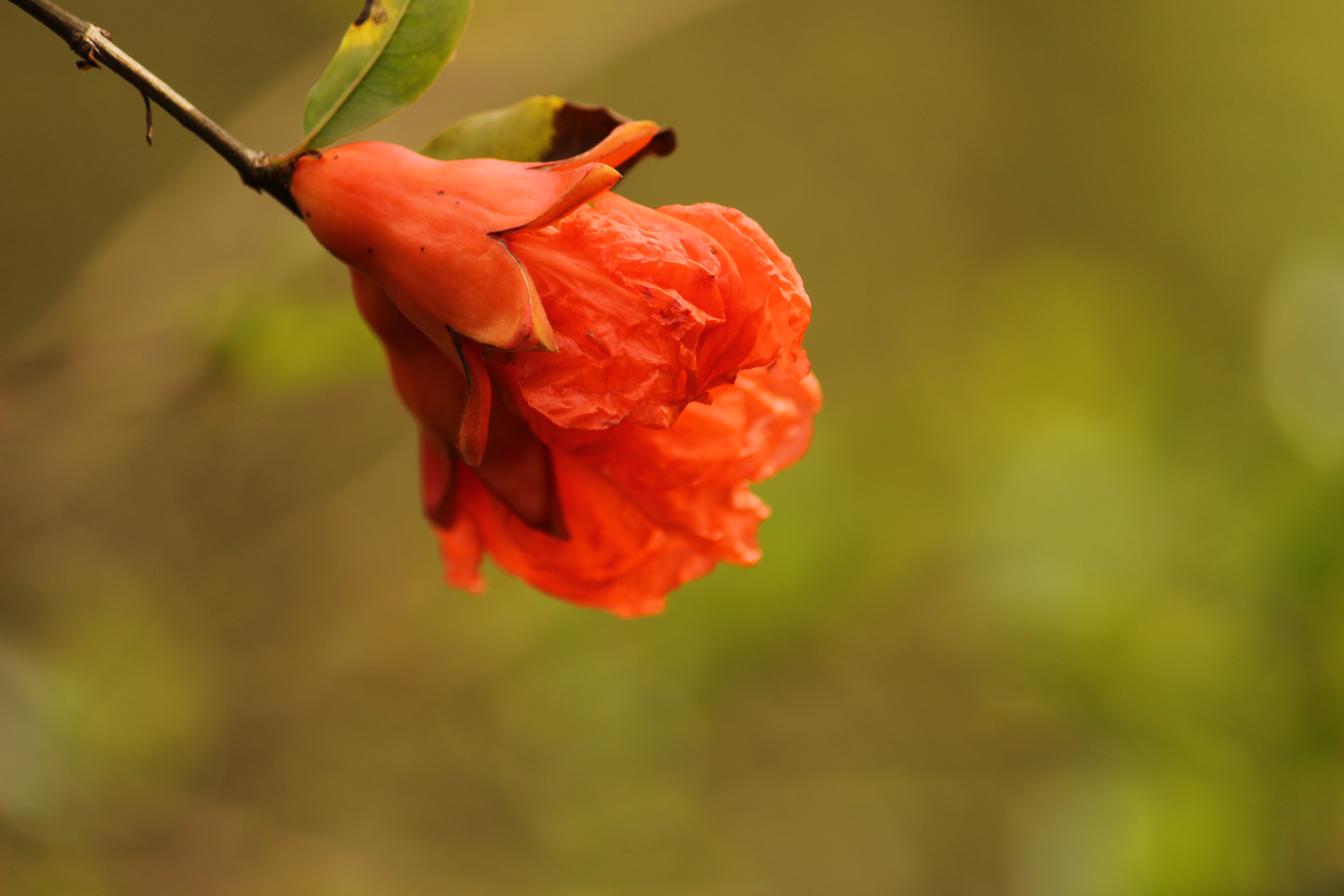
Pomegranate flower

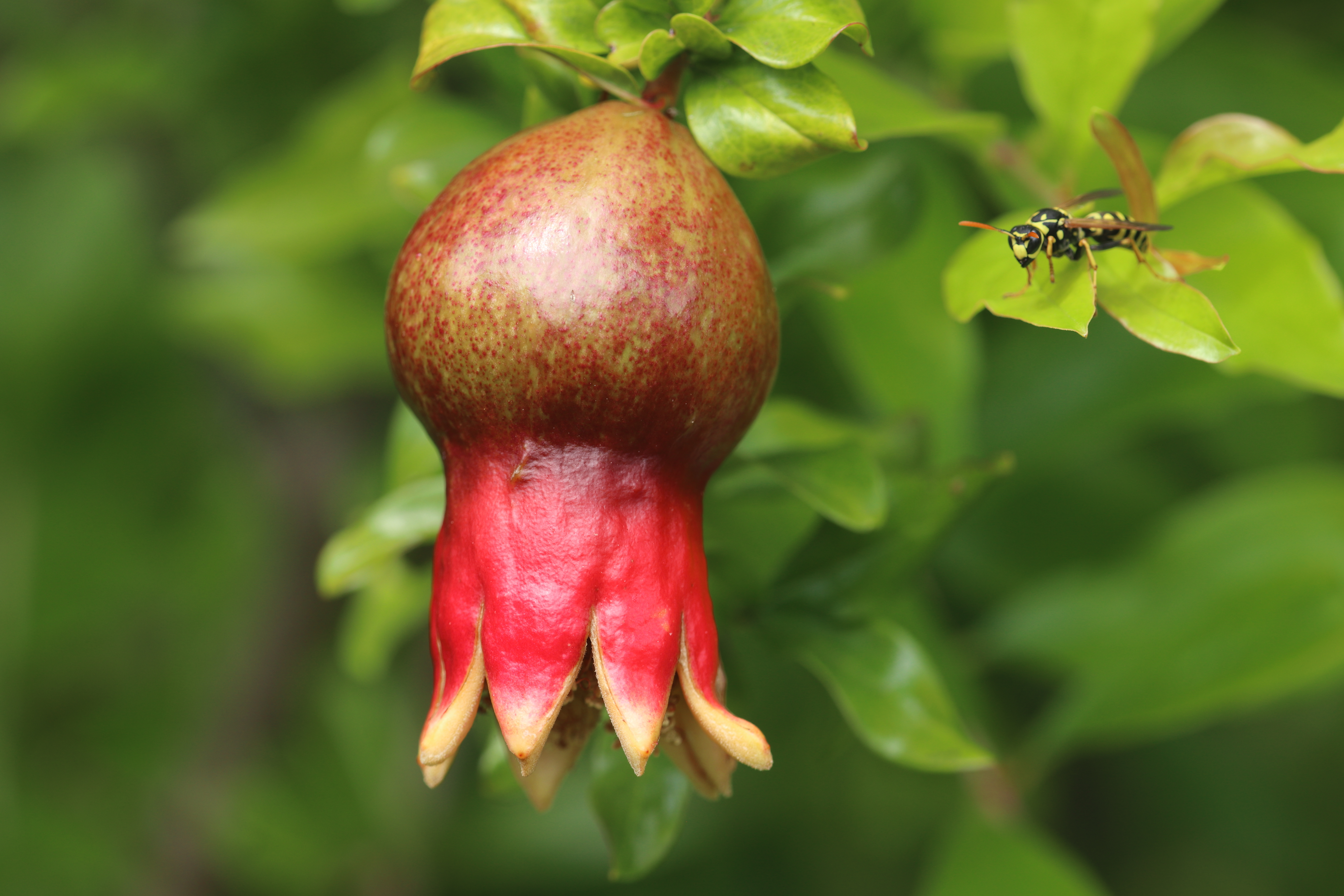
Fruit setting

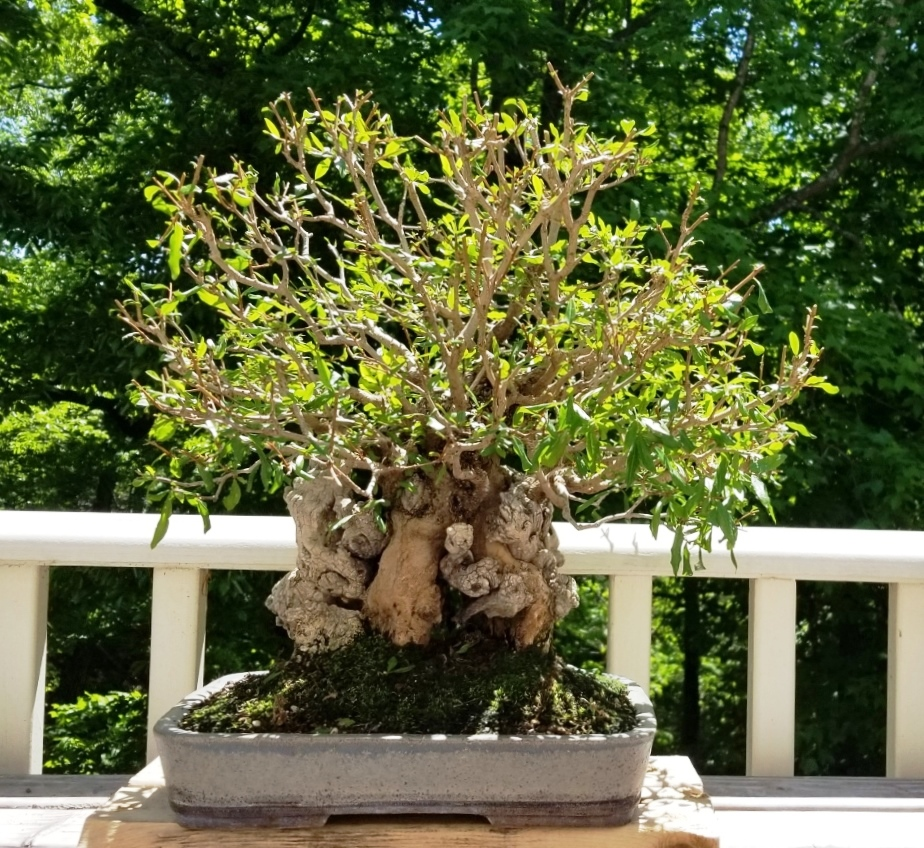
Pomegranate being trained as a bonsai

== Cultivation ==
P. granatum is grown for its fruit crop, and as ornamental trees and shrubs in parks and gardens. Mature specimens can develop sculptural twisted bark, multiple trunks, and a distinctive overall form. Pomegranates are drought-tolerant, and can be grown in dry areas with either a Mediterranean winter rainfall climate or a summer rainfall climate. In wetter areas, they can be prone to root decay from fungal diseases. They can tolerate moderate frost, down to about −12 °C (10 °F).

Insect pests of the pomegranate can include the butterflies Virachola isocrates, Iraota timoleon, and Deudorix epijarbas, and the leaf-footed bug Leptoglossus zonatus. Fruit flies and ants are attracted to unharvested ripe fruit.

=== Propagation ===
P. granatum reproduces sexually in nature, but can be propagated asexually. Propagation methods include layering, hardwood cuttings, softwood cuttings, and tissue culture. Required conditions for rooting cuttings include warm temperatures within the 18–29 °C (65–85 °F) range and a semihumid environment. Rooting hormone increases rooting success rate, but is not required.

=== Varieties ===
P. granatum var. nana is a dwarf variety of P. granatum popularly planted as an ornamental plant in gardens and larger containers, and used as a bonsai specimen tree. It could well be a wild form with a distinct origin. It has gained the Royal Horticultural Society's Award of Garden Merit.

The only other species in the genus Punica is the Socotran pomegranate (P. protopunica), which is endemic to the Socotran archipelago of four islands in the Arabian Sea. The territory is part of Yemen. It differs in having pink (not red) flowers and smaller, less sweet fruit.

=== Cultivars ===
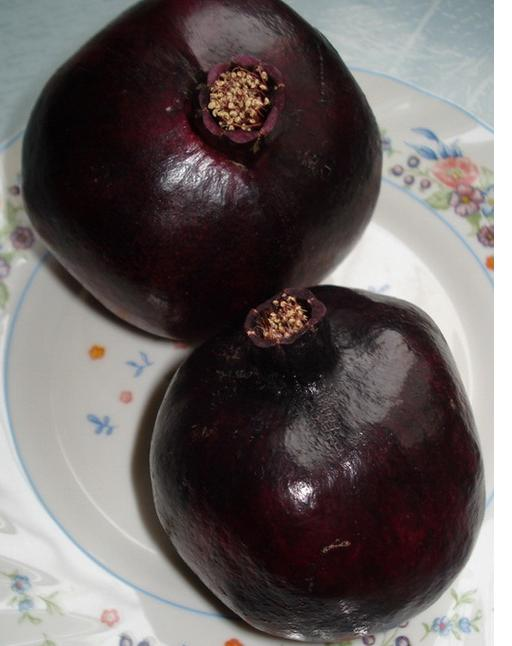
Black pomegranate

P. granatum has more than 500 named cultivars, but has considerable synonymy in which the same genotype is named differently across regions of the world. Several characteristics between pomegranate genotypes vary for identification, consumer preference, preferred use, and marketing, the most important of which are fruit size, exocarp colour (ranging from yellow to purple, with pink and red most common), seed coat colour (ranging from white to red), the hardness of the seed, maturity, juice content and its acidity, sweetness, and astringency.

== Production and export ==
The leading producers globally are India and China, followed by Iran, Turkey, Afghanistan, the US, Iraq, Pakistan, Syria, and Spain. In 2019, Chile, Peru, Egypt, Israel, India, and Turkey supplied pomegranates to the European market. Chile was the main supplier to the United States market, which has a limited supply from Southern California. China was self-sufficient for its pomegranate supply in 2019, while other South Asia markets were supplied mainly by India. Pomegranate production and exports in South Africa competed with South American shipments in 2012–2018, with export destinations including Europe, West Asia, the United Kingdom, and Russia. South Africa imports pomegranates mainly from Israel.

== History ==
The pomegranate is native to Iran and it was first domesticated by ancient Iranians in the Iranian plateau and nearby regions about 5,000 years ago. Archaeological and historical evidence shows that the pomegranate, especially its blossom (golnār), was a sacred and symbolic element in ancient Persian culture from prehistoric times through the Achaemenid period in about 500 BC, associated with fertility, abundance, royal authority, and the deities Mithra and Anahita. There is a petroglyph at Persepolis showing a pomegranate flower in the hand of an Achaemenian king, highlighting its ritual and symbolic significance in imperial iconography.

In Pakistan, it grows wild between 1,000 and 2,000 metres altitude, mainly in the western part of the country. Pomegranates have been cultivated throughout the Middle East, India, and the Mediterranean region for several millennia, and they are also cultivated in the Central Valley of California and in Arizona. Pomegranates may have been domesticated as early as the fifth millennium BC, as they were one of the first fruit trees to be domesticated in the eastern Mediterranean region.

Remains of the fruit dating to the Neolithic period have been found at Gezer in Israel, and carbonised pomegranate exocarp has been recovered from early Bronze Age levels at Tell es-Sultan (Jericho) in the West Bank. Additional remains from this period have been found at Arad and Gezer in Israel. Evidence from the Late Bronze Age includes pomegranate remains at Hala Sultan Tekke in Cyprus and the site of Tiryns in Greece. A large, dry pomegranate was found in the tomb of Djehuty, the butler of Queen Hatshepsut in Egypt; Mesopotamian records written in cuneiform mention pomegranates from the mid-third millennium BC onwards.

Waterlogged pomegranate remains have been identified at the circa 14th century BC Uluburun shipwreck off the coast of Turkey. Other goods on the ship include perfume, ivory and gold jewellery, suggesting that pomegranates at this time may have been considered a luxury good. Other archaeological finds of pomegranate remains from the Late Bronze Age have been found primarily in elite residences, supporting this inference. During the Iron Age, the fruit was a frequent decorative motif in Israelite material culture, appearing on ancient artifacts.

It is extensively grown in southern China and Southeast Asia, whether originally spread along the Silk Road route or brought by sea traders. Kandahar is famous in Afghanistan for its high-quality pomegranates.

The pomegranate was introduced to England in the 17th century by John Tradescant the Elder, but the disappointment that it did not set fruit there led to its repeated introduction to the American colonies, even New England. It succeeded in the South: Bartram received a barrel of pomegranates and oranges from a correspondent in Charleston, South Carolina, 1764. John Bartram partook of "delitious" pomegranates with Noble Jones at Wormsloe Plantation, near Savannah, Georgia, in September 1765. Thomas Jefferson planted pomegranates at Monticello in 1771.

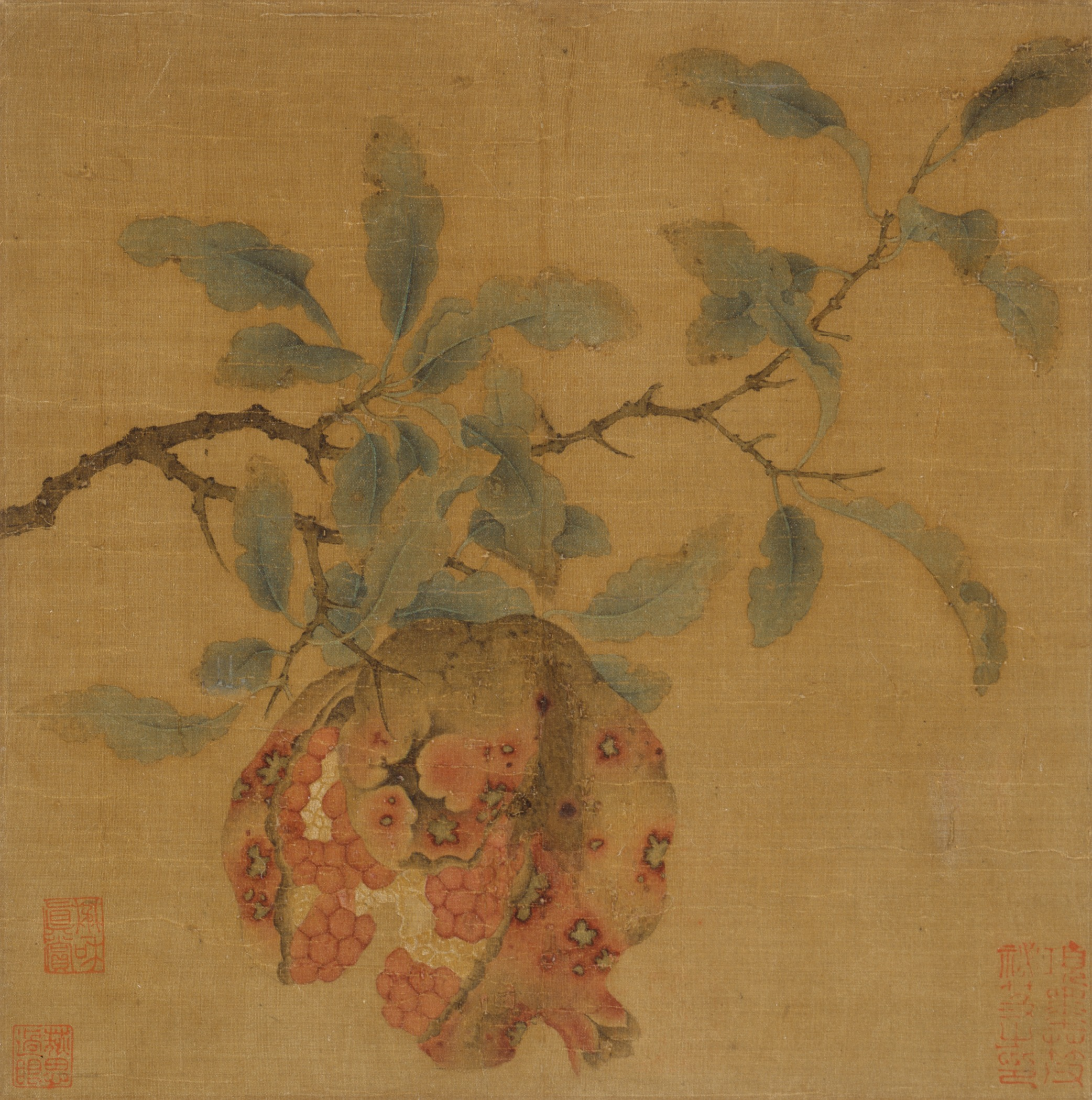
Pomegranate, late Southern Song dynasty or early Yuan dynasty circa 1200–1340

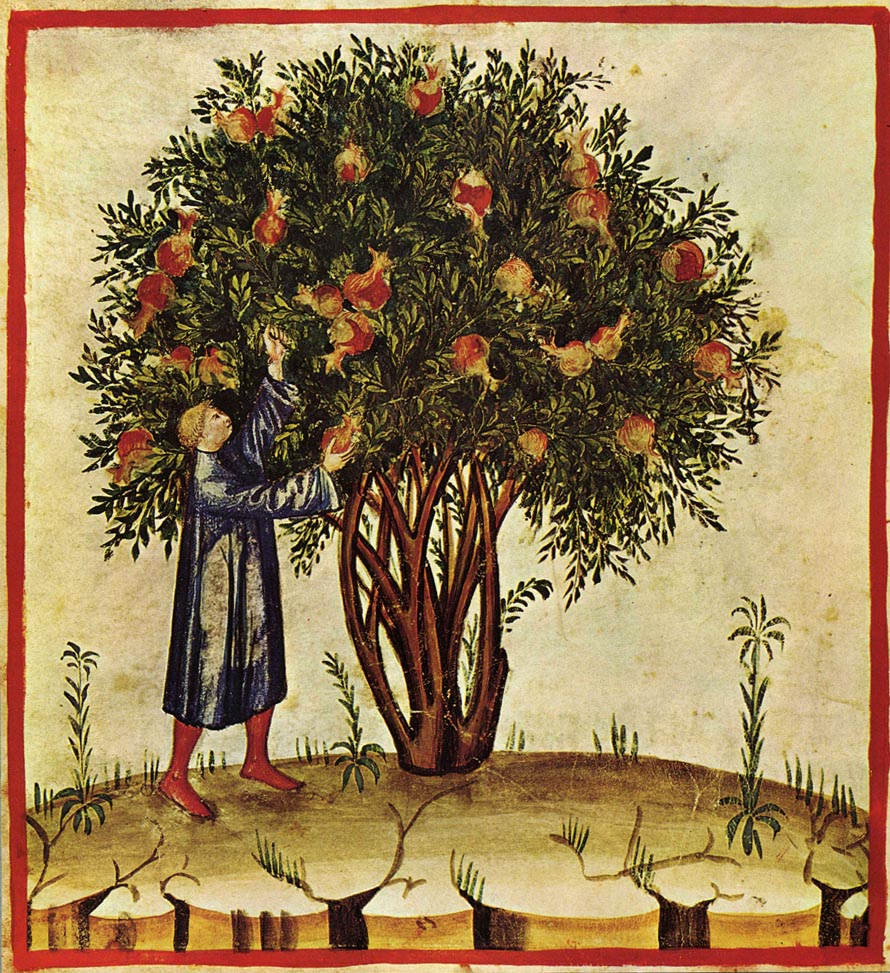
A pomegranate tree in an illustration for the Tacuinum Sanitatis, made in Lombardy, late 14th century

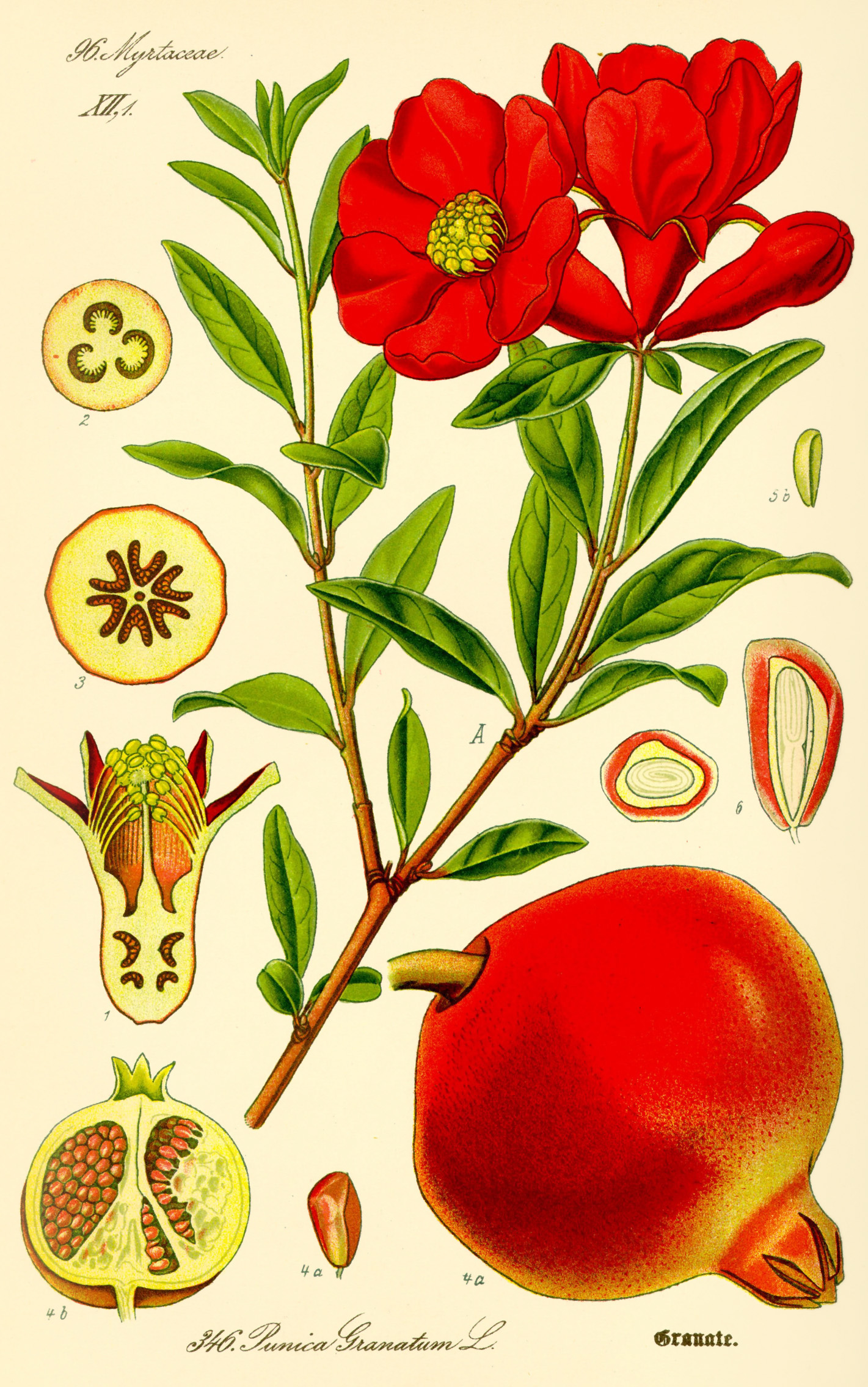
Illustration by Otto Wilhelm Thomé, 1885

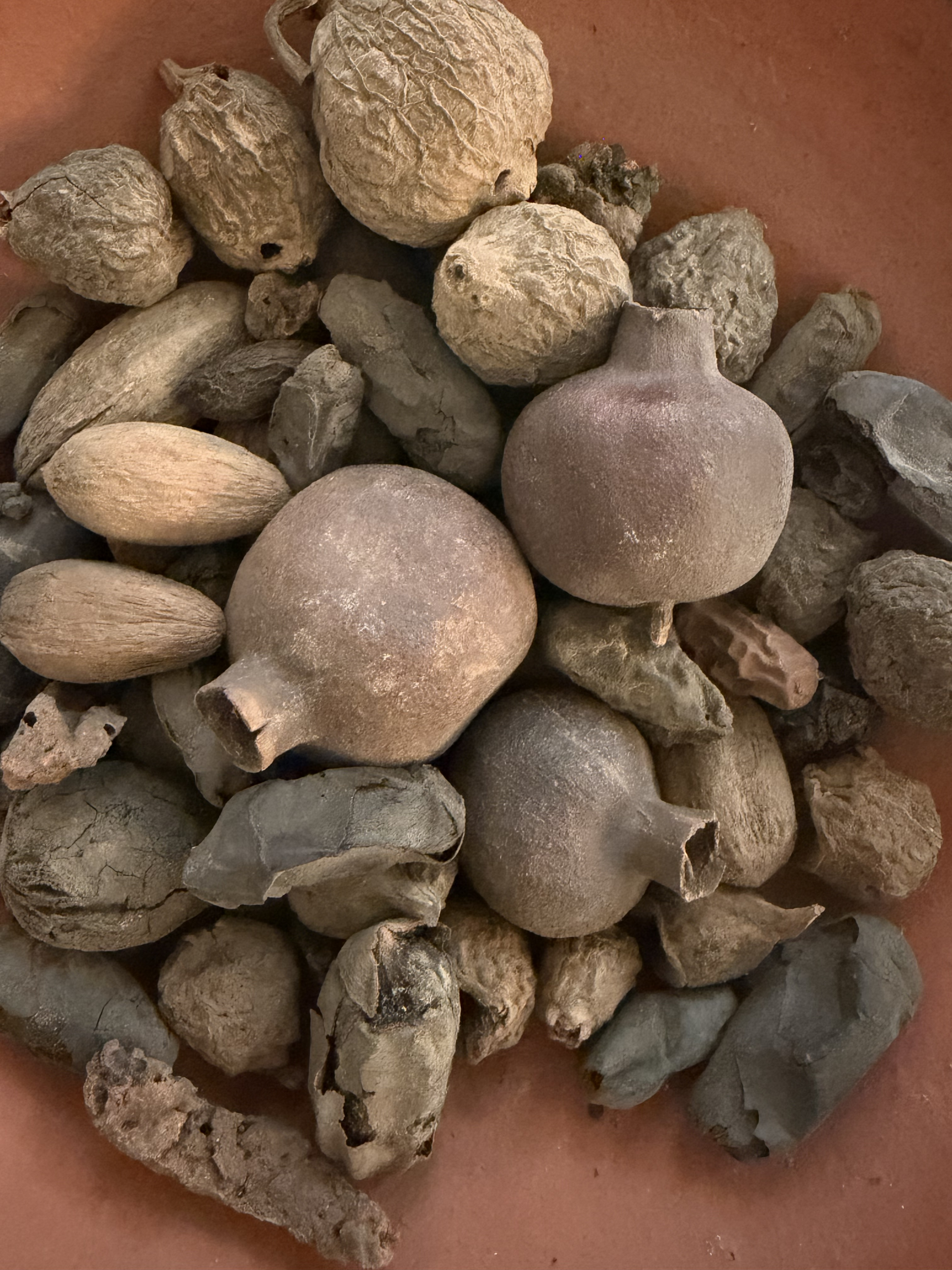
Ancient pomegranates with dates, Egyptian tomb offering, 2000–1500 BCE. At the Louvre.

== Use ==
=== Fruit ===
Pomegranate juice can be sweet or sour, but most fruit are moderate in taste, with sour notes from the acidic ellagitannins contained in the juice. Pomegranate juice has long been a common drink in West Asia and Europe, and is distributed worldwide. Grenadine syrup, commonly used in cocktails, originally consisted of thickened and sweetened pomegranate juice.

Before tomatoes (a New World fruit) arrived in West Asia, pomegranate juice, pomegranate molasses, and vinegar were widely used in Iranian cuisine; this mixture is found in traditional recipes such as fesenjān, a thick sauce made from pomegranate juice and ground walnuts, usually spooned over duck or other poultry and rice, and in ash-e anar (pomegranate soup).

In Turkey, pomegranate sauce (Turkish: nar ekşisi) is used as a salad dressing, to marinate meat, or to drink. Pomegranate syrup, also called pomegranate molasses, is used in muhammara, a roasted red pepper, walnut, and garlic spread popular in Syria and Turkey.

=== Seed ===
In Turkey, pomegranate seeds are used in salads and sometimes as garnish for desserts such as güllaç.

In Mexico, pomegranate seeds are used to adorn the traditional dish chiles en nogada, representing the red of the Mexican flag in the dish which evokes the green (poblano pepper), white (nogada sauce) and red (pomegranate seeds).

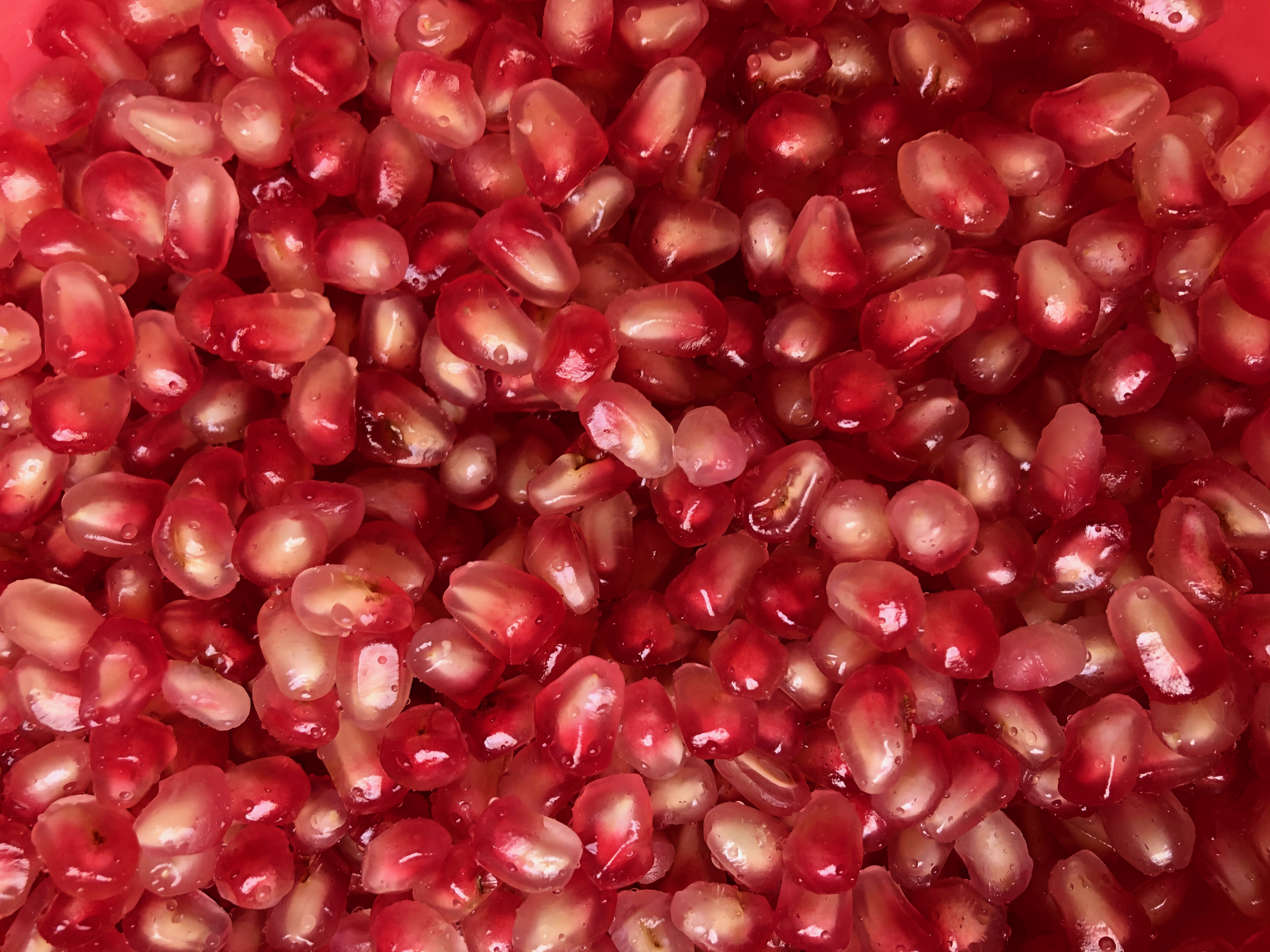
Pomegranate seeds are edible raw.

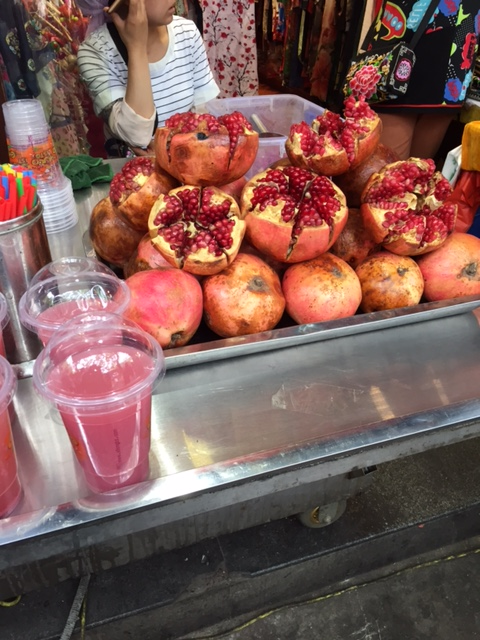
A stall selling pomegranate juice in Xi'an, China

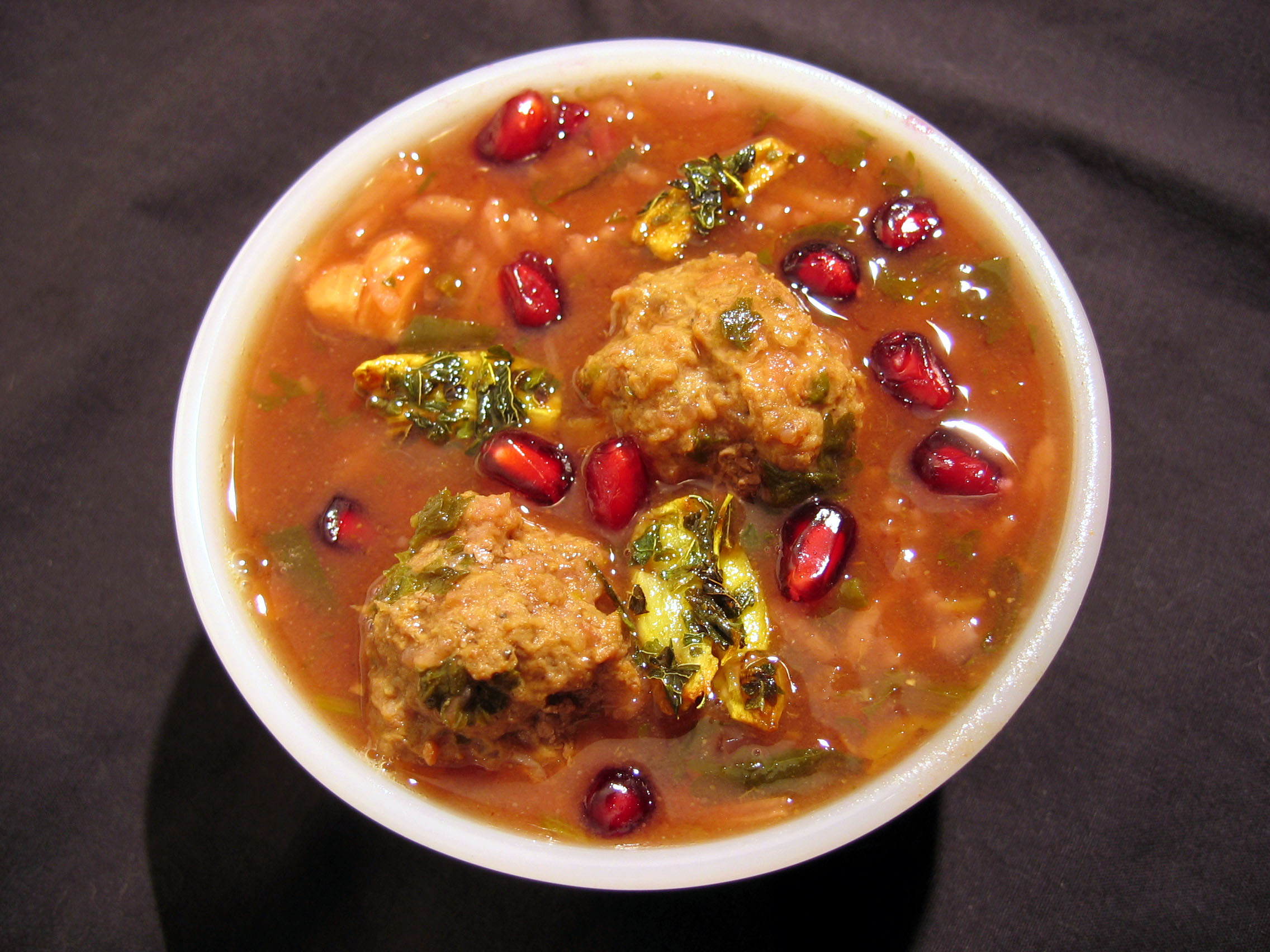
A bowl of ash-e anar, an Iranian soup made with pomegranate juice

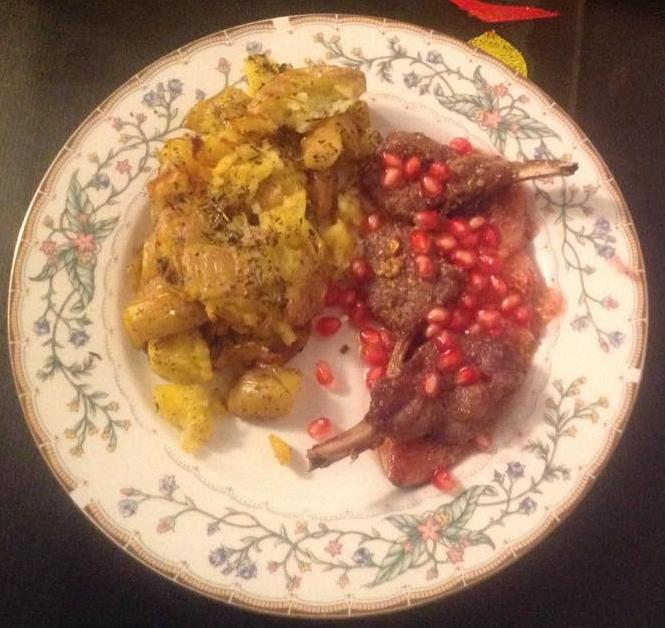
Turkish lamb chops with candied figs and herbed mashed potatoes, garnished with pomegranate

=== Peel ===
Pomegranate peels may be used to stain wool and silk in the carpet industry.

== Nutrition ==
Pomegranates, raw
Nutritional value per 100 g (3.5 oz)
- Energy: 346 kJ (83 kcal)
- Carbohydrates: 18.7 g
- Sugars: 13.67 g
- Dietary fibre: 4 g
- Fat: 1.17 g
- Protein: 1.67 g
Vitamins and minerals
Vitamins	Quantity %DV^{†}
Thiamine (B1)	6% 0.067 mg
Riboflavin (B2)	4% 0.053 mg
Niacin (B3)	2% 0.293 mg
Pantothenic acid (B5)	8% 0.377 mg
Vitamin B6	4% 0.075 mg
Folate (B9)	10% 38 μg
Choline	1% 7.6 mg
Vitamin C	11% 10.2 mg
Vitamin E	4% 0.6 mg
Vitamin K	14% 16.4 μg
Minerals	Quantity %DV^{†}
Calcium	1% 10 mg
Iron	2% 0.3 mg
Magnesium	3% 12 mg
Manganese	5% 0.119 mg
Phosphorus	3% 36 mg
Potassium	8% 236 mg
Sodium	0% 3 mg
Zinc	3% 0.35 mg
- Other constituents: Quantity
- Water: 78 g
- Link to USDA Database entry
- ^{†}Percentages estimated using US recommendations for adults, except for potassium, which is estimated based on expert recommendation from the National Academies.

The edible portion of raw pomegranate is 78% water, 19% carbohydrates, 2% protein, and 1% fat (table). A 100 g (3.5 oz) serving of pomegranate sarcotesta provides 11% of the Daily Value (DV) for vitamin C, 14% DV for vitamin K, and 10% DV for folate, while the seeds are a rich source of dietary fibre (20% DV).

== Research ==
=== Phytochemicals ===
The most abundant phytochemicals in pomegranate juice are polyphenols, including the hydrolyzable tannins called ellagitannins formed when ellagic acid and gallic acid bind with a carbohydrate to form pomegranate ellagitannins, also known as punicalagins. The red colour of the juice is attributed to anthocyanins, such as delphinidin, cyanidin, and glycosides of pelargonidin. Generally, an increase in juice pigmentation occurs during fruit ripening. The phenolic content of pomegranate juice is degraded by processing and pasteurisation techniques. Pomegranate peel contains a high amount of polyphenols, condensed tannins, catechins, and prodelphinidins. The higher phenolic content of the peel yields extracts for use in dietary supplements and food preservatives. Pomegranate seed oil contains punicic acid (65%), palmitic acid (5%), stearic acid (2%), oleic acid (6%), and linoleic acid (7%).

=== Health claims ===
Despite limited research data, manufacturers and marketers of pomegranate juice have liberally used results from preliminary research to promote products. In February 2010, the FDA issued a warning letter to one such manufacturer, POM Wonderful, for using published literature to make illegal claims of unproven antidisease effects. In May 2016, the US Federal Trade Commission declared that POM Wonderful could not make health claims in its advertising; the US Supreme Court upheld the FTC decision.

== Symbolism ==
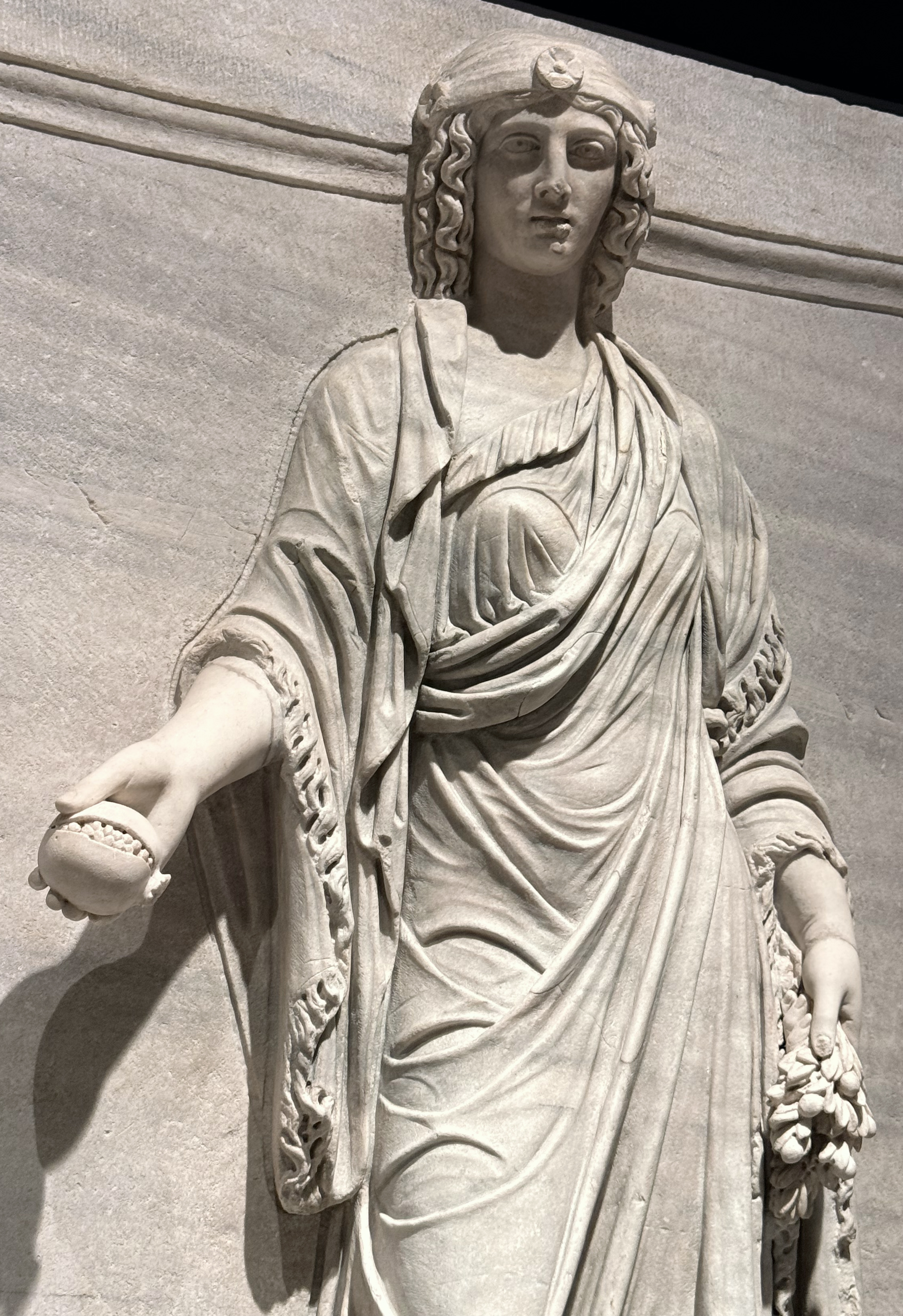
Roman statue of Aegyptus, personification of Egypt, holding a pomegranate

In ancient Assyria, pomegranates were commonly depicted, indicating abundance and fruitfulness with the agricultural cycle. In ancient Iran, the pomegranate tree was believed to be grown from places where the blood of the hero Siyâvash was spilled. The Zoroastrians of Iran serve it in their festivals of Mehregan and Nowruz, and in wedding ceremonies. They used to plant a pomegranate tree in their fire temples to use its leaves in their ceremonies. Ancient Egyptians regarded the pomegranate as a symbol of prosperity and ambition. According to the Ebers Papyrus, Egyptians used the pomegranate to treat tapeworm infections.

In ancient Greece, a pomegranate is displayed on coins from Side, a city named for the fruit. In Ancient Greek mythology, the pomegranate was known as the "fruit of the dead", and believed to have sprung from the blood of Adonis. The myth of Persephone, the goddess of the underworld, features her consumption of pomegranate seeds, requiring her to spend a certain number of months in the underworld every year.

The pomegranate is one of the Seven Species of fruit and grains listed in the Hebrew Bible as special products of the Land of Israel. In Judaism, the pomegranate's biblical associations persist in ritual and material culture; for example, woven pomegranates trimmed the hem of the High Priest's robe. The finials that adorn the staves of a Torah scroll are known as rimonim ("pomegranates"), a name derived from their originally spherical shape and reinforced by the fruit's Temple associations; they are frequently hung with bells, echoing the priestly robe. A widespread popular tradition holds that the fruit contains 613 seeds, corresponding to the 613 commandments; the figure does not appear in rabbinic sources, which invoke the pomegranate more generally as an image of abundance. Pomegranates are eaten on Rosh Hashanah, where they figure among the simanim (symbolic foods) of the Rosh Hashanah seder, accompanied by a petition that the coming year be as full of merits as the pomegranate is of seeds. The fruit also recurs as an image of love and fertility in the Song of Songs. A fourth-century floor mosaic from Hinton St Mary, Dorset, depicts the bust of Christ and the chi rho flanked by pomegranates. In Islam, Chapter 55 of the Quran mentions the pomegranate as a "favour" among many to be offered to those fearful of the "Lord" in "two Gardens".

The pomegranate is a symbol in Armenia, representing fertility, abundance, and marriage. Every autumn, the Goychay Pomegranate Festival is held in the city of Goychay, Azerbaijan. In Palestinian culture, the pomegranate symbolises fertility and is deeply embedded in folklore and traditions. Introduced to China during the Han dynasty (206 BC – 220 AD), the pomegranate was an emblem of fertility, and pictures of the ripe fruit with the seeds bursting forth were hung in homes. In some Hindu traditions, the pomegranate symbolises prosperity and fertility, and is associated with both Bhumi (the earth goddess) and Ganesha.
