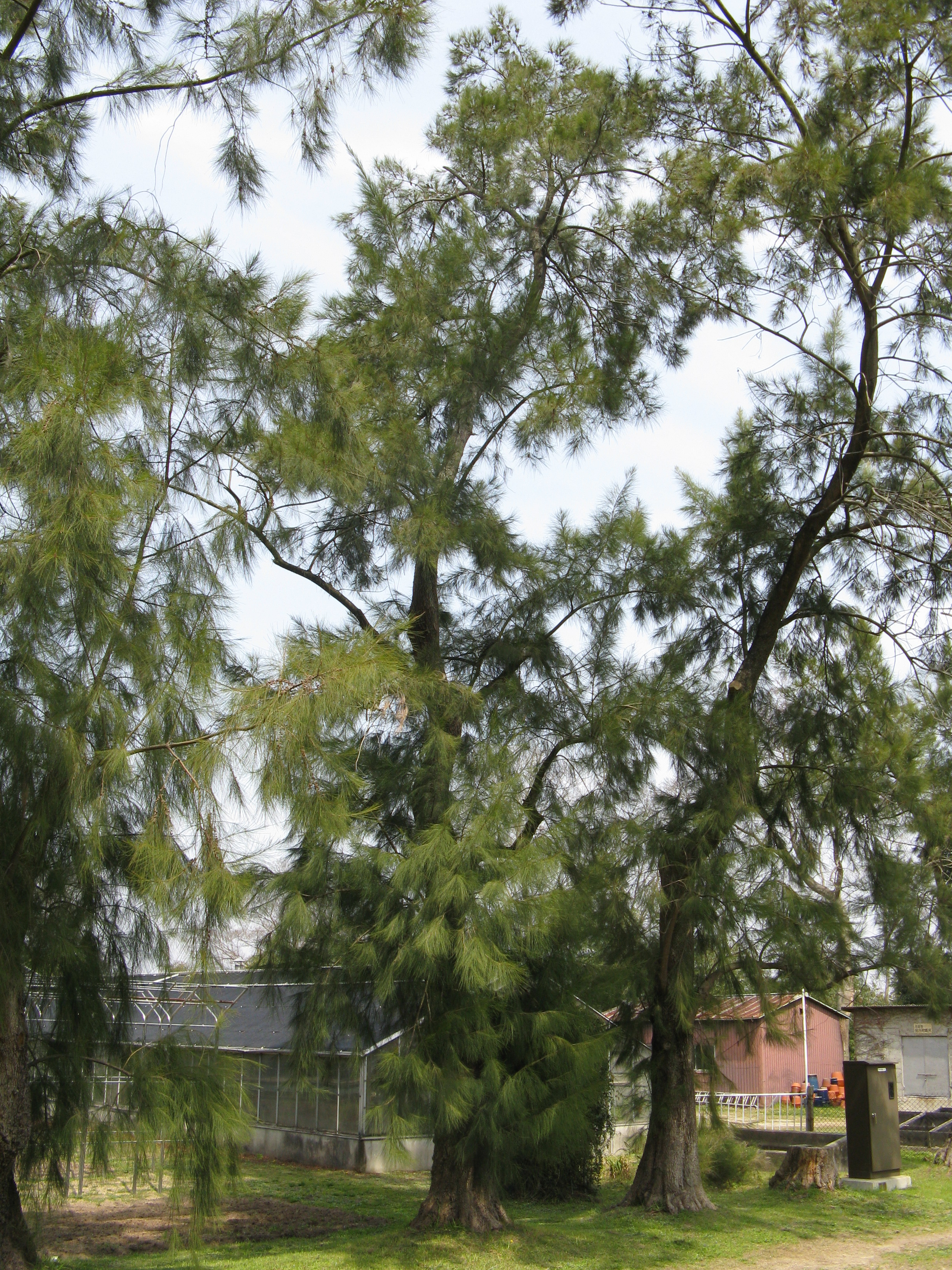

Conservation status
- Least Concern (IUCN 3.1)

Scientific classification
- Kingdom: Plantae
- Clade: Tracheophytes
- Clade: Angiosperms
- Clade: Eudicots
- Clade: Rosids
- Order: Fagales
- Family: Casuarinaceae
- Genus: Allocasuarina
- Species: A. verticillata

Binomial name
- Allocasuarina verticillata (Lam.) L.A.S.Johnson
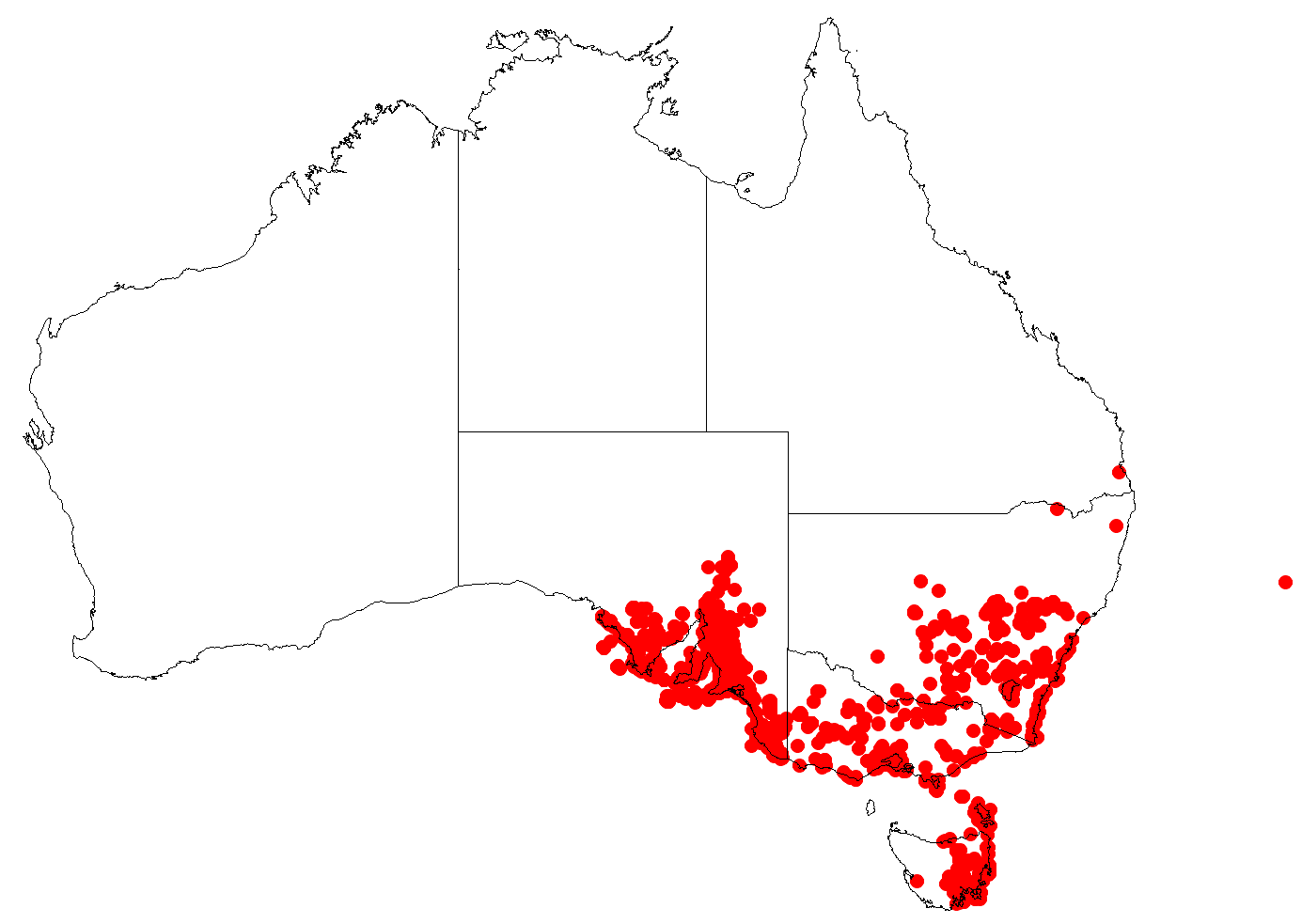
- Occurrence data from AVH

Synonyms
- List: Casuarina excelsa Salisb. nom. illeg., nom. superfl.; Casuarina gunnii Miq.; Casuarina macrocarpa Miq. nom. inval., pro syn.; Casuarina macrocarpa Miq. nom. inval., pro syn.; Casuarina quadrivalvis Labill.; Casuarina quadrivalvis var. macrocarpa Miq.; Casuarina quadrivalvis Labill. var. quadrivalvis; Casuarina quadrivalvis var. spectabilis Miq.; Casuarina stricta Aiton; Casuarina stricta Aiton var. stricta; Casuarina tortuosa A.Henry; Casuarina verticillata Lam.

= Allocasuarina verticillata =

Species of plant

Allocasuarina verticillata, commonly known as drooping sheoak, is a species of flowering plant in the family Casuarinaceae and is endemic to south-eastern Australia. It is a small dioecious tree that has drooping branchlets up to 400 mm (16 in) long, the leaves reduced to scales in whorls of nine to thirteen, the mature fruiting cones 20–50 mm (0.8–2 in) long containing winged seeds (samaras) 7–12 mm (0.3–0.5 in) long.

== Description ==
Allocasuarina verticillata is a small dioecious tree that typically grows to a height of 4–10 m (13–33 ft), has fissured bark, and the penultimate branchlets are woody. The branchlets are up to 400 mm (16 in) long, the leaves reduced to spreading teeth 0.7–1.2 mm (0.03–0.05 in) long, usually arranged in whorls of nine to thirteen around the branchlets. The sections of branchlet between the leaf whorls are 15–40 mm (0.6–2 in) long, 0.7–1.5 mm (0.03–0.06 in) in diameter but broader at the end near the teeth. Male flowers are arranged in spikes 30–120 mm (1–5 in) long, with about 2.5 to 4 whorls per cm (per 0.4 in), the anthers 1.2–2.5 mm (0.05–0.1 in) long. Female cones are sessile or on a peduncle up to 10 mm (0.4 in) long, and the mature cones are cylindrical to barrel-shaped, 25–50 mm (1–2 in) long and 17–30 mm (0.7–1 in) in diameter, containing dark brown, winged seeds (samaras) 7–12 mm (0.3–0.5 in) long. Flowering occurs in all months.

== Taxonomy and naming ==
Drooping sheoak was first formally described in 1788 by French naturalist Jean-Baptiste Lamarck, who gave it the name Casuarina verticillata in Encyclopédie Méthodique, Botanique from a tree grown in the Jardin du Roi. In 1982, Lawrie Johnson transferred the species to Allocasuarina as A. verticillata in the Journal of the Adelaide Botanic Gardens. The specific epithet verticillata means 'having whorls'.

The 1889 book The Useful Native Plants of Australia records common names of the plant, including shingle oak, coast she-oak, river oak, salt-water swamp oak, and that it was called worgnal by the indigenous people of the Richmond and Clarence River areas of New South Wales. It also records that "In cases of severe thirst, great relief may be obtained from chewing the foliage of this and other species, which, being of an acid nature, produces a flow of saliva — a fact well-known to bushmen who have traversed waterless portions of the country. This acid is closely allied to citric acid, and may prove identical with it. Children chew the young cones, which they call 'oak apples'."

== Distribution and habitat ==
Allocasuarina verticillata usually grows in grassy woodland, sometimes forming pure stands and sometimes with eucalypts. It is also found on rocky sea coasts and on dry ridges inland. In New South Wales it occurs on rocky hills south from Cobar and on coastal shale south from Sydney. It is widespread in Victoria, extending westwards to the Flinders Ranges, Gawler Ranges, western Eyre Peninsula and Kangaroo Island in South Australia. In Tasmania, the species is found near Launceston and on the east coast as far south as Hobart and the Tasman Peninsula.

== Uses ==
Aboriginal Australians make use of the tree for a range of tasks. The Ngunnawal people make tools including boomerangs from the tree's timber. Mature cones are used as children's toys.

== Ecology ==
On Kangaroo Island, A. verticillata is the preferred food of the glossy black cockatoo, which holds the cones in its foot and shreds them with its powerful bill before removing the seeds with its tongue.

== Biochemistry ==
Pedunculagin, casuarictin, strictinin, casuarinin and casuariin are ellagitannins, which have been found in this species.

== Gallery ==
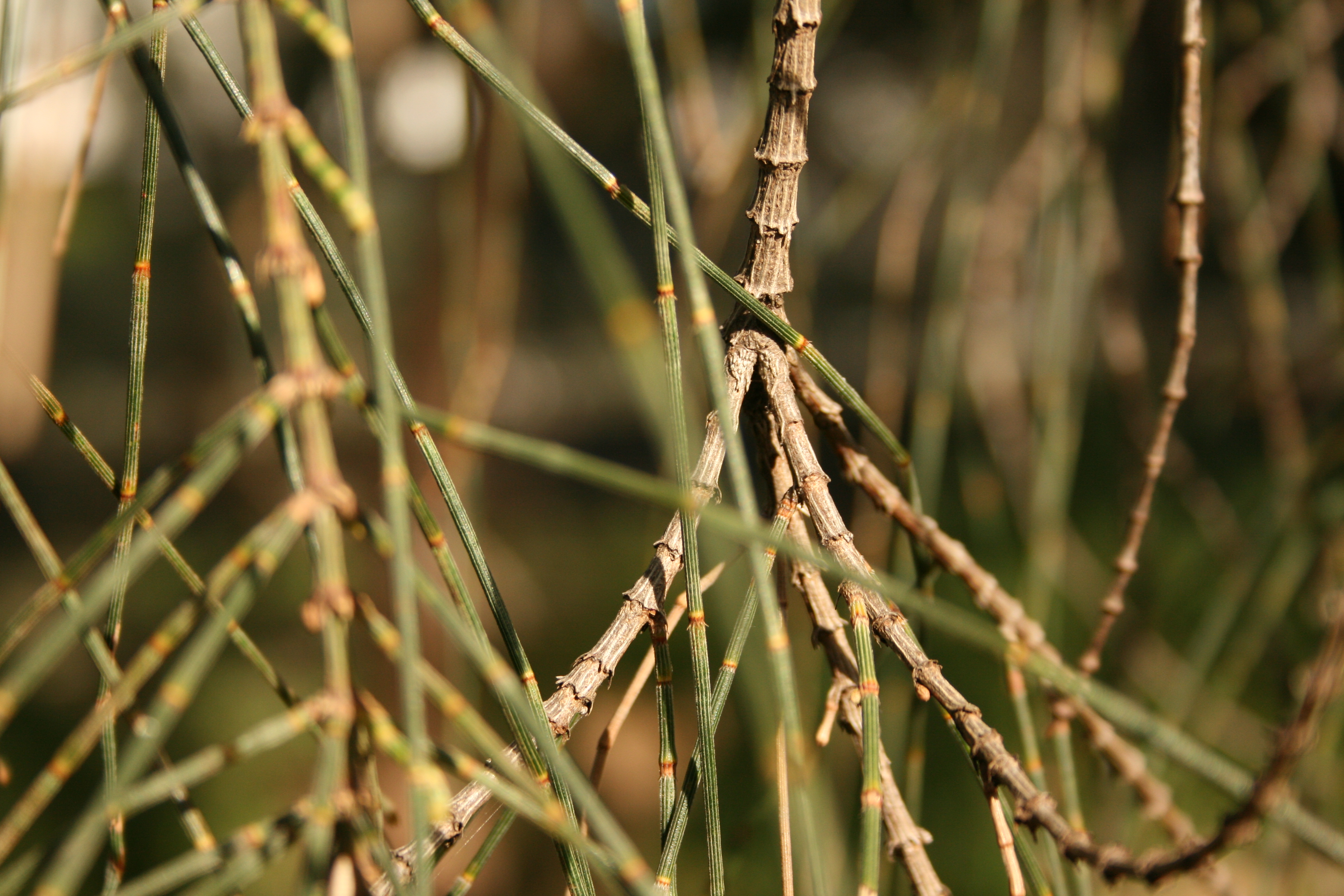
Penultimate woody branchlets

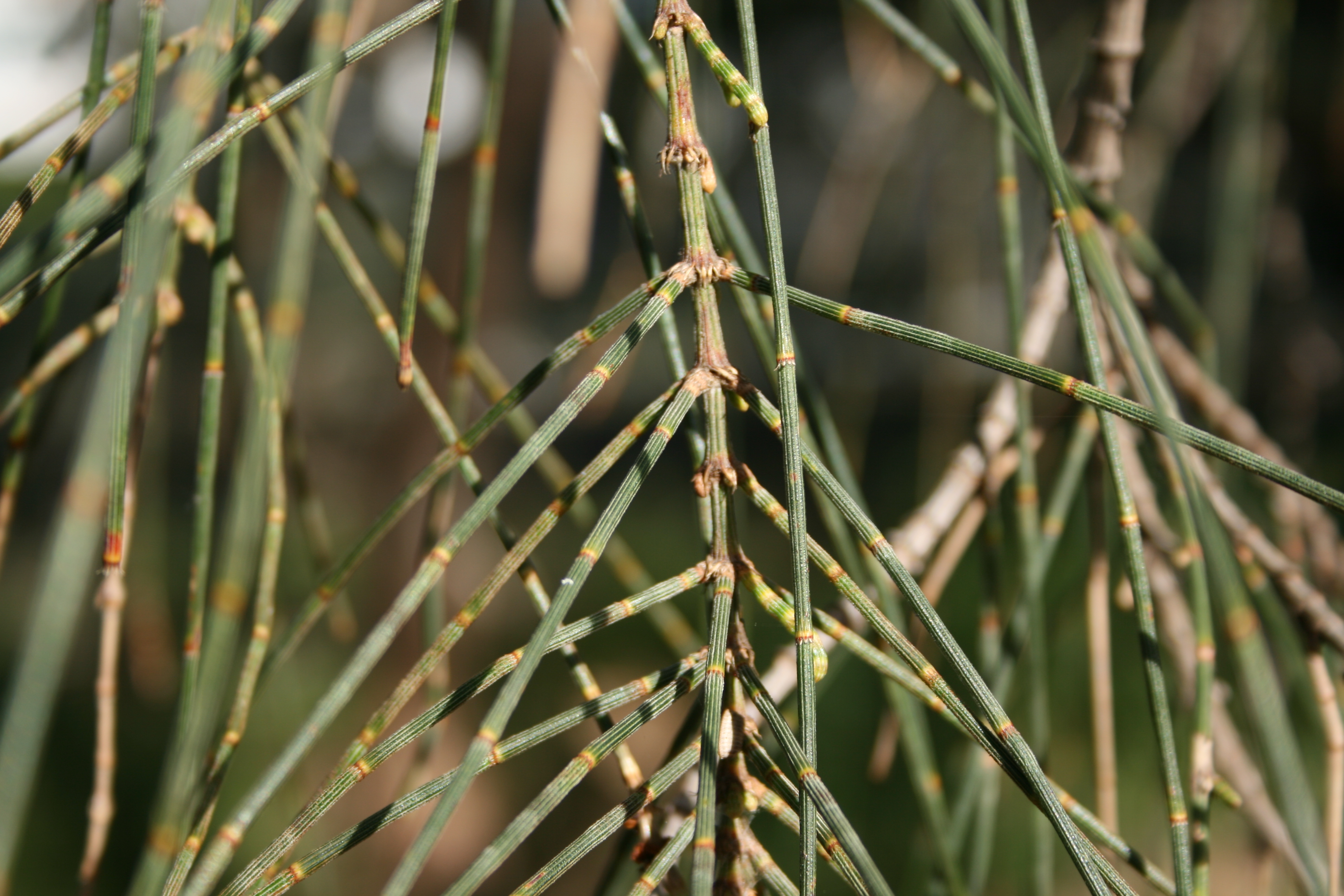
Photosynthetic stems (phylloclades)

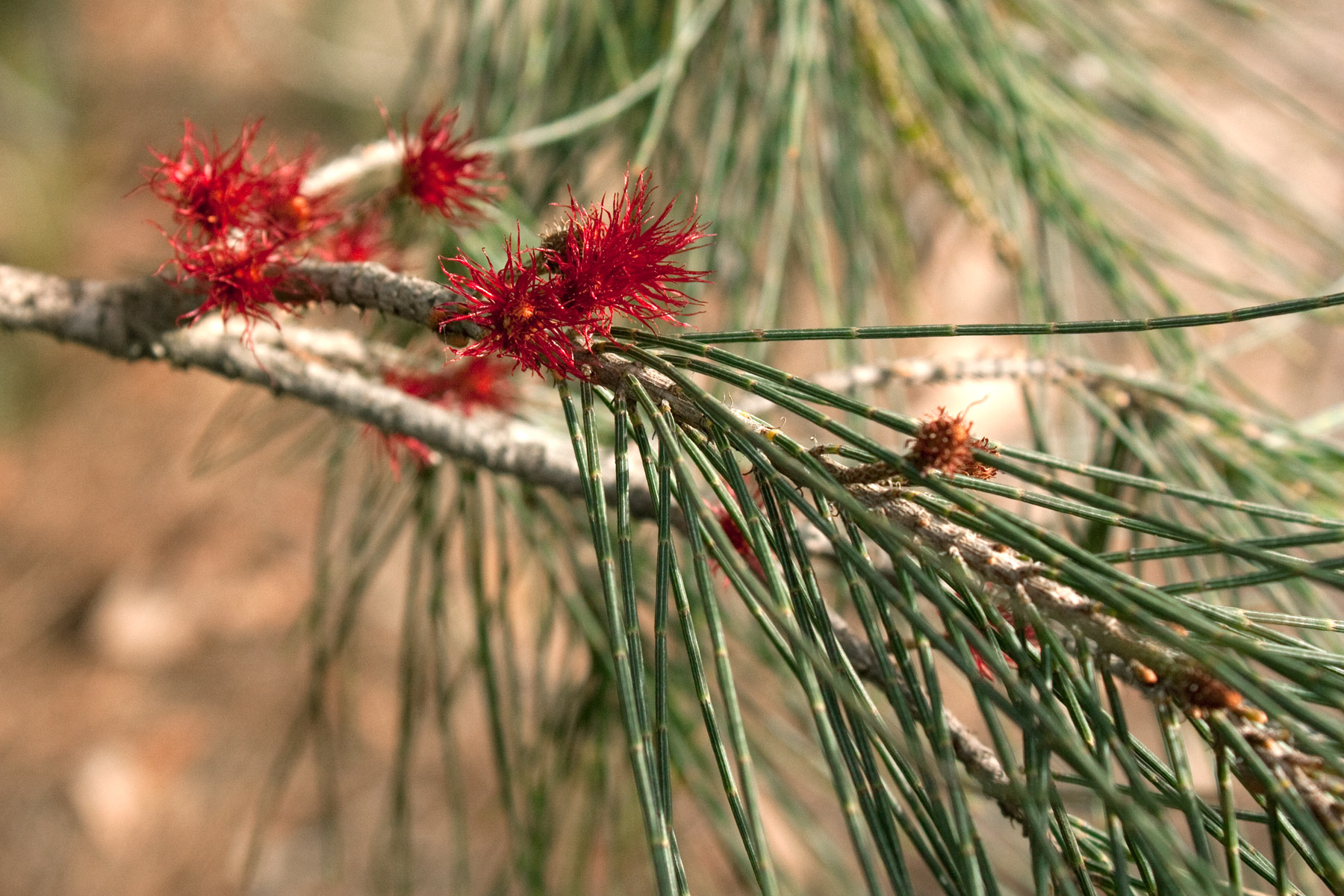
Female inflorescence

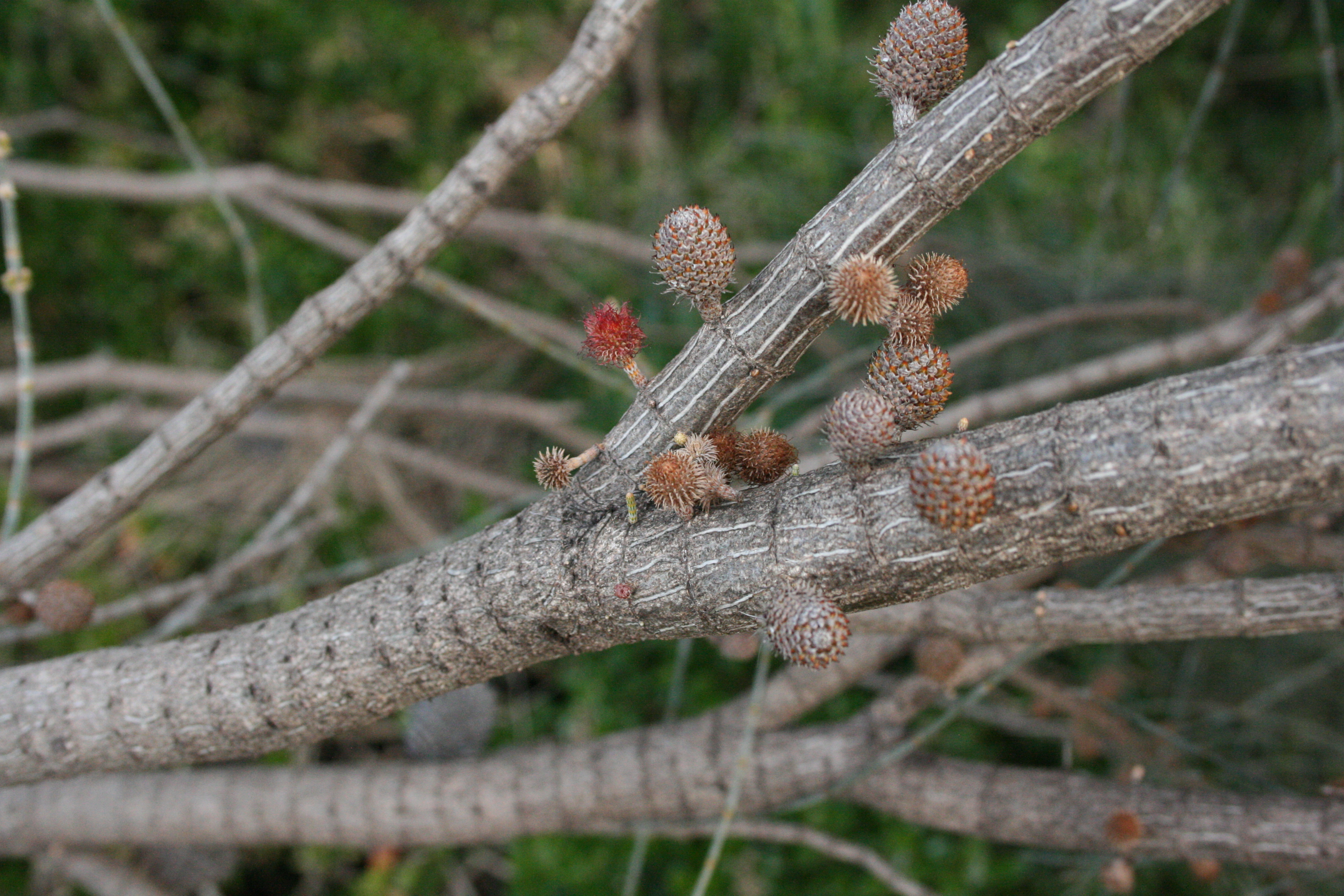
Female inflorescence and cones developing on inner branches

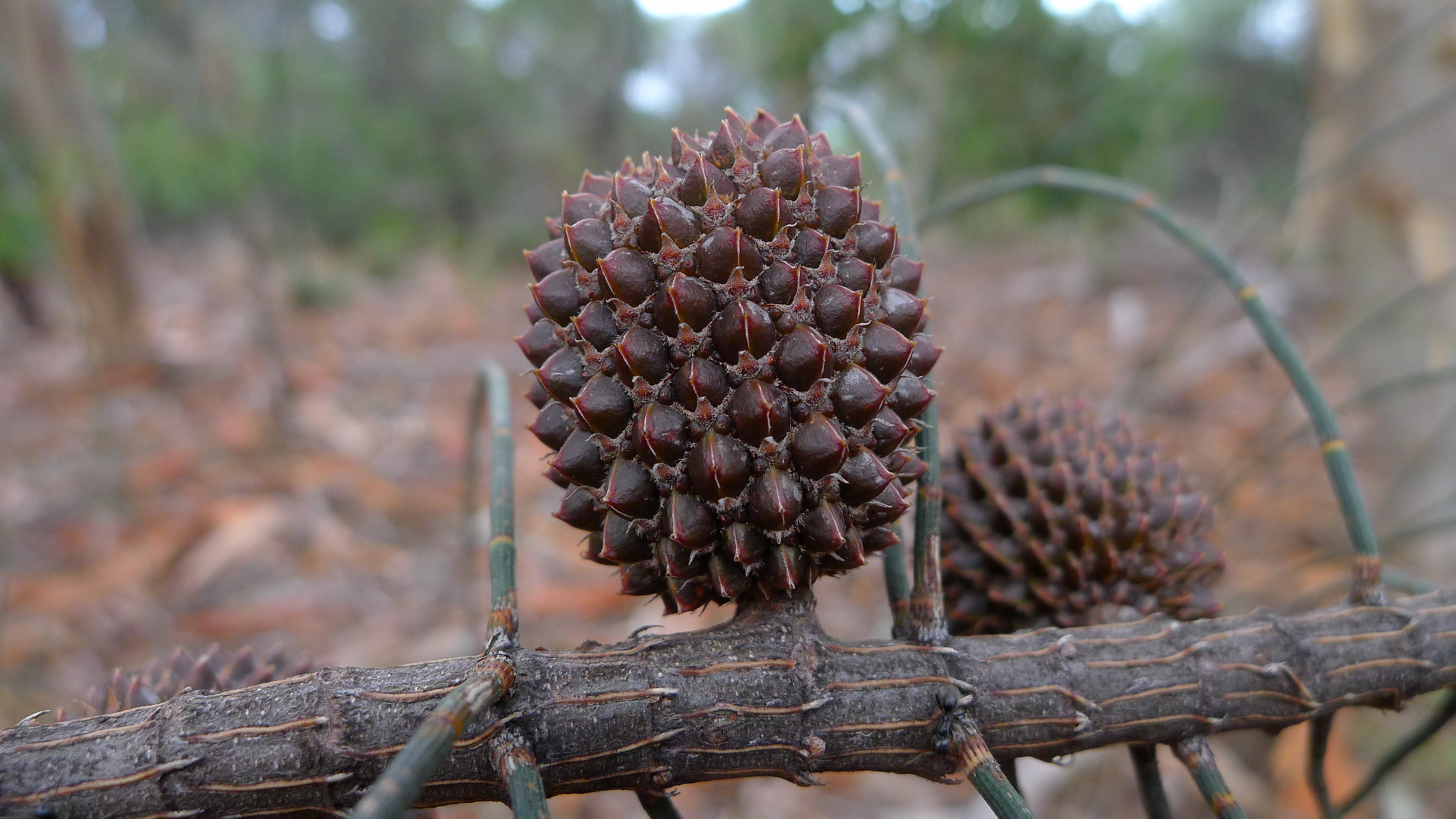
Mature cone

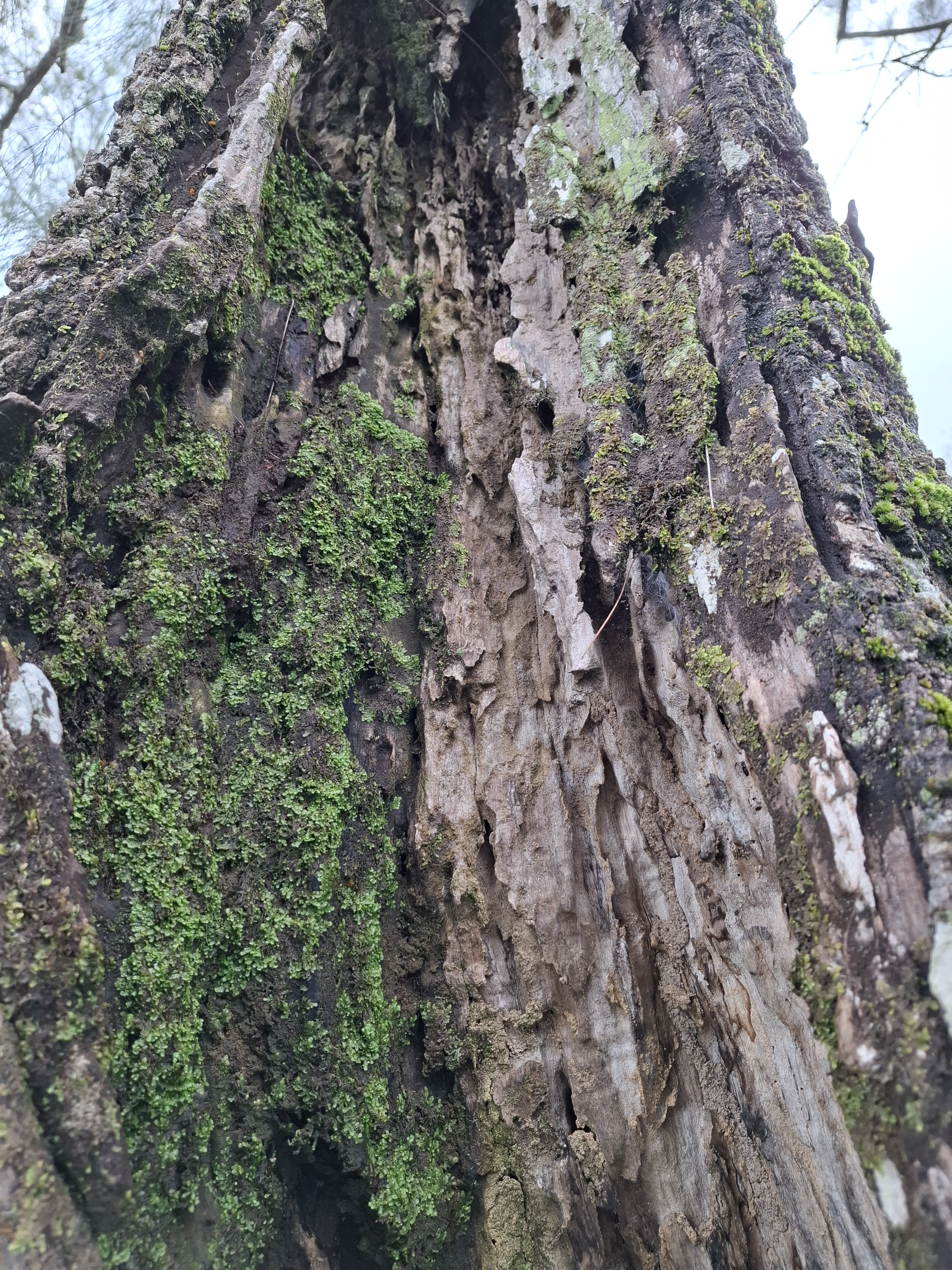
Trunk

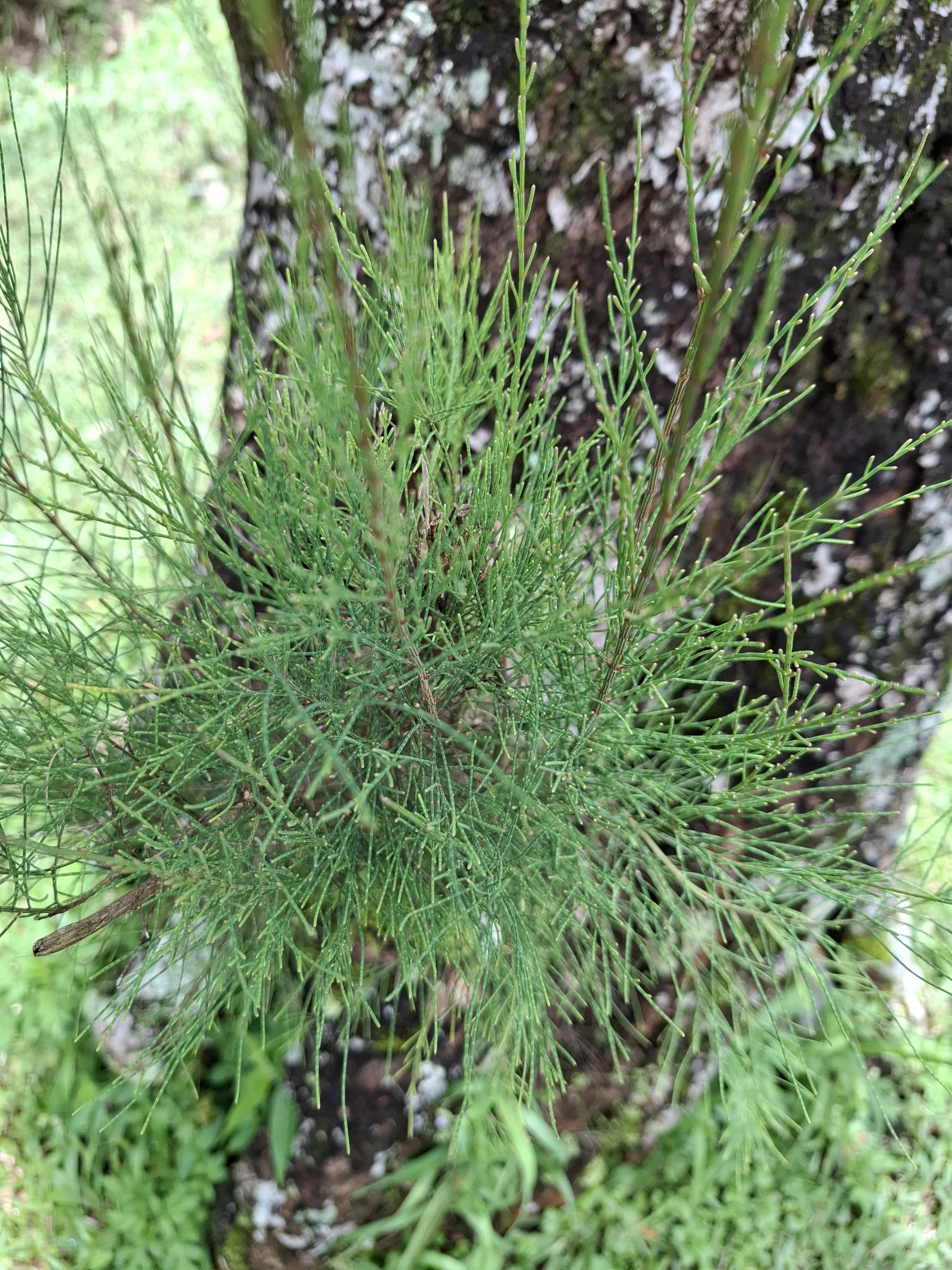
Foliage
