= C41H30O26 =

The molecular formula C_{41}H_{30}O_{26} (molar mass: 938.66 g/mol, exact mass: 938.102531 u) may refer to:

- Nupharin A, an ellagitannin
- Punicafolin, an ellagitannin
- Tellimagrandin II, an ellagitannin
