= Granatin =

Granatin may refer to:

- Granatin A, an ellagitannin
- Granatin B, an ellagitannin
