= Casuarinin =

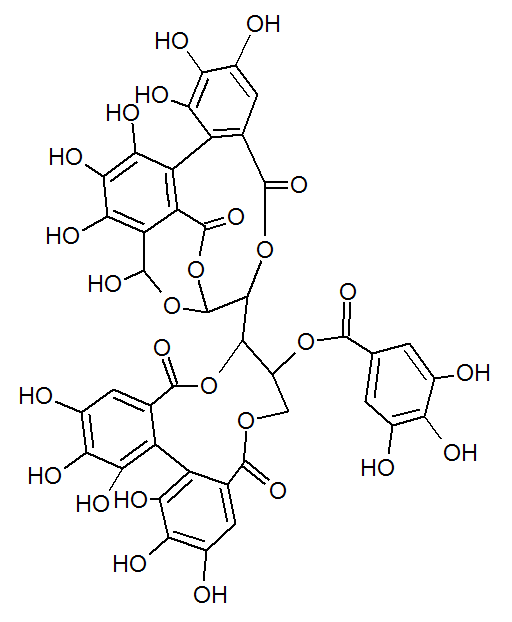
- Chemical structure of Casuarinin

Names
- Other names Stachyurin

Identifiers
CAS Number	79786-01-9; 81739-27-7
3D model (JSmol)	Interactive image
ChemSpider	138517
PubChem CID	157395
UNII	S45A8T6Q4C
CompTox Dashboard (EPA)	DTXSID101000731
- InChI: InChI=1S/C41H28O26/c42-11-1-7(2-12(43)23(11)47)37(58)64-16-6-63-38(59)8-3-13(44)24(48)27(51)17(8)18-9(4-14(45)25(49)28(18)52)39(60)65-34(16)36-35-32(56)22-21(41(62)66-35)20(30(54)33(57)31(22)55)19-10(40(61)67-36)5-15(46)26(50)29(19)53/h1-5,16,32,34-36,42-57H,6H2 Key: MMQXBTULXAEKQE-UHFFFAOYSA-N
- SMILES: C1C(C(OC(=O)C2=CC(=C(C(=C2C3=C(C(=C(C=C3C(=O)O1)O)O)O)O)O)O)C4C5C(C6=C(C(=C(C(=C6C(=O)O5)C7=C(C(=C(C=C7C(=O)O4)O)O)O)O)O)O)O)OC(=O)C8=CC(=C(C(=C8)O)O)O

Properties
Chemical formula	C_{41}H_{28}O_{26}
Molar mass	936.64 g/mol
- Except where otherwise noted, data are given for materials in their standard state (at 25 °C [77 °F], 100 kPa). Infobox references

Casuarinin is an ellagitannin. It is found in the pericarp of pomegranates (Punica granatum). It is also found in Casuarina and Stachyurus species and in Alnus sieboldiana.

It is an isomer of casuarictin. It is a highly active carbonic anhydrase inhibitor.

== Biosynthesis ==
In some plants including oak and chestnut, the ellagitannins are formed from 1,2,3,4,6-pentagalloyl-glucose and further elaborated via oxidative dehydrogenation (tellimagrandin II and casuarictin formations). After conversion of casuarictin to pedunculagin, the pyranose ring of the glucose opens and the family of compounds including casuariin, casuarinin, castalagin, and castalin, vescalagin and vescalin forms.
