= Dronabinol/acetazolamide =

Combination drug

Combination of
- Dronabinol: Cannabinoid
- Acetazolamide: Carbonic anhydrase inhibitor

Clinical data
- Other names: IHL-42X

Legal status
- Legal status: Investigational

Dronabinol/acetazolamide (investigational name IHL-42X) is a combination therapy under investigation for sleep apnea. It is developed by Incannex Healthcare.
