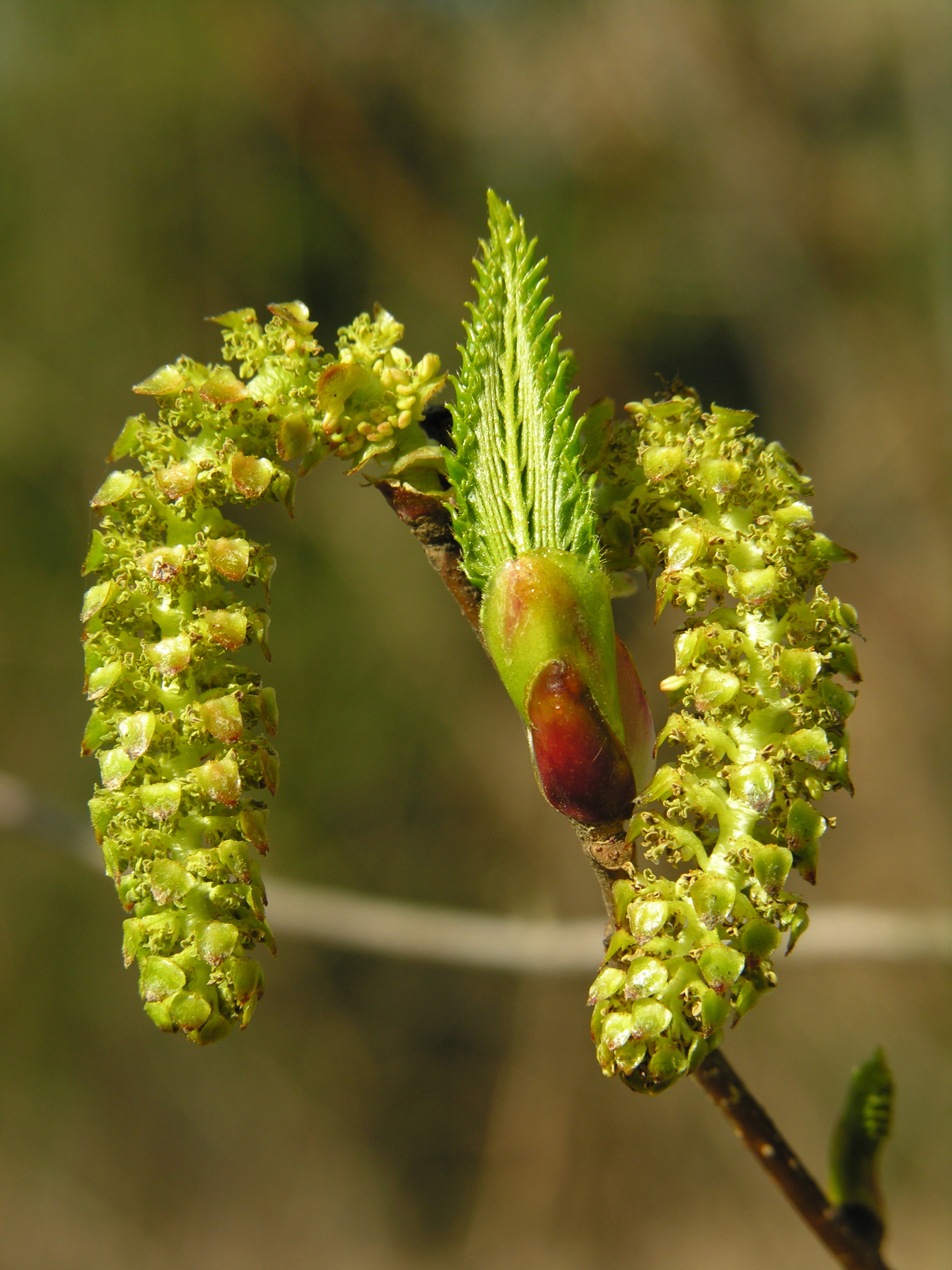
- Alnus sieboldiana catkins

Conservation status
- Data Deficient (IUCN 3.1)

Scientific classification
- Kingdom: Plantae
- Clade: Embryophytes
- Clade: Tracheophytes
- Clade: Angiosperms
- Clade: Eudicots
- Clade: Rosids
- Order: Fagales
- Family: Betulaceae
- Genus: Alnus
- Species: A. sieboldiana

Binomial name
- Alnus sieboldiana Matsum.

Synonyms
- Alnus firma var. sieboldiana (Matsum.) H.J.P.Winkl.; Alnaster sieboldianus (Matsum.) Murai; Duschekia sieboldiana (Matsum.) Holub

= Alnus sieboldiana =

Species of tree

Alnus sieboldiana (オオバヤシャブシ in Japanese) is an alder species found on the islands of Honshu, Shikoku, and Suwanosejima in Japan.

A. sieboldiana contains ellagitannins including alnusiin, tellimagrandin I, pedunculagin, casuarinin, casuariin and 2,3-O-(S)-hexahydroxydiphenoyl-D-glucose.

The Latin specific epithet sieboldiana refers to German physician and botanist Philipp Franz von Siebold (1796–1866).

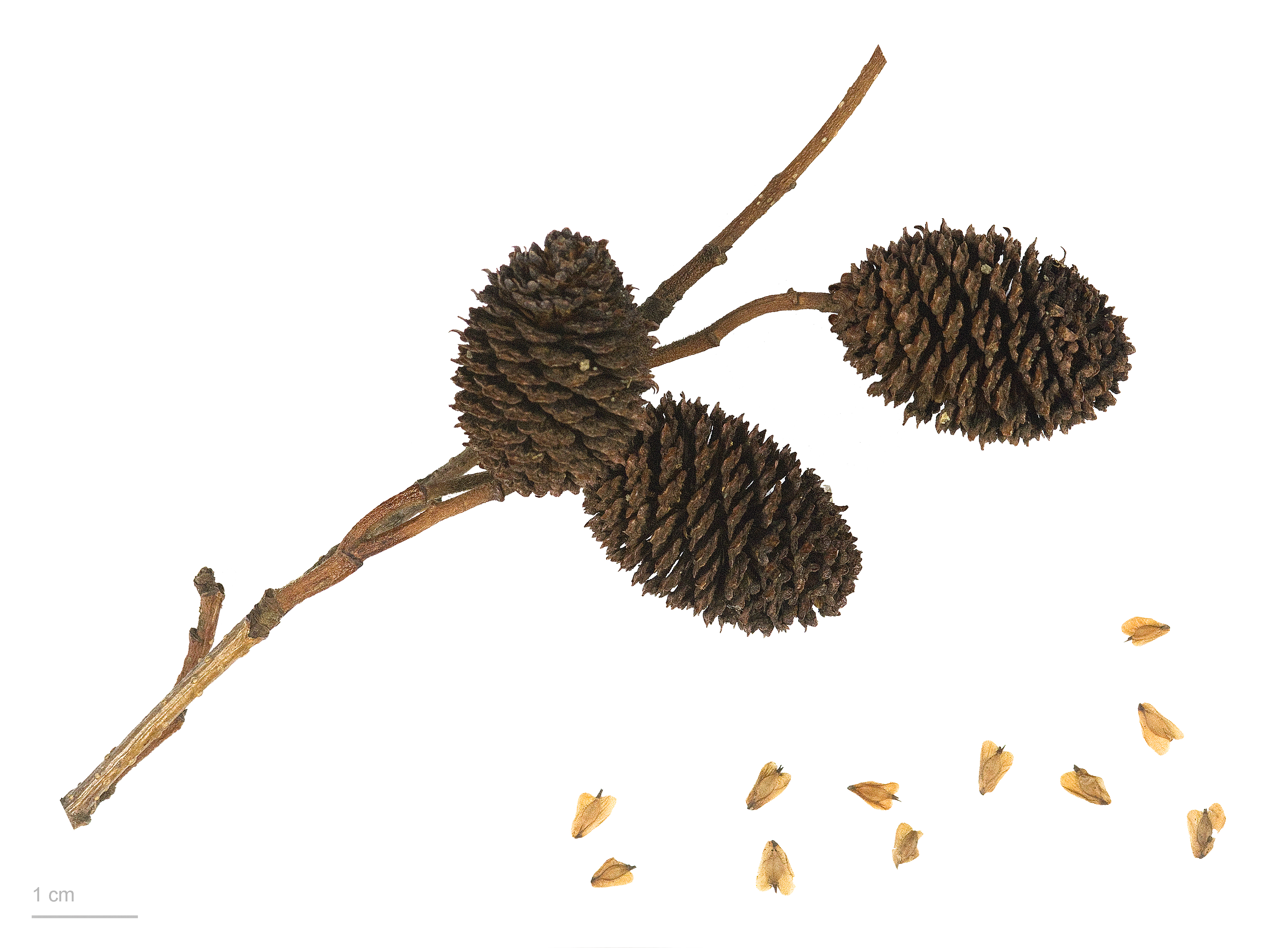
Alnus sieboldiana – MHNT
