= Brinzolamide/brimonidine =

Combination drug

Combination of
- Brinzolamide: Carbonic anhydrase inhibitor
- Brimonidine: Alpha-adrenergic agonist

Clinical data
- Trade names: Simbrinza
- AHFS/Drugs.com: Professional Drug Facts
- License data: US DailyMed: Brinzolamide brimonidine
- Pregnancy category: AU: B3
- Routes of administration: Eye drop
- ATC code: S01EC54 (WHO)

Legal status
- Legal status: UK: POM (Prescription only); US: ℞-only; EU: Rx-only; In general: ℞ (Prescription only)

Identifiers
- PubChem CID: 9961469
- KEGG: D10854

Chemical and physical data
- Formula: C_{23}H_{31}BrN_{8}O_{5}S_{3}
- Molar mass: 675.64 g·mol^{−1}
- 3D model (JSmol): Interactive image
- SMILES: CCNC1CN(S(=O)(=O)C2=C1C=C(S2)S(=O)(=O)N)CCCOC.C1CN=C(N1)NC2=C(C3=NC=CN=C3C=C2)Br
- InChI: InChI=1S/C12H21N3O5S3.C11H10BrN5/c1-3-14-10-8-15(5-4-6-20-2)23(18,19)12-9(10)7-11(21-12)22(13,16)17;12-9-7(17-11-15-5-6-16-11)1-2-8-10(9)14-4-3-13-8/h7,10,14H,3-6,8H2,1-2H3,(H2,13,16,17);1-4H,5-6H2,(H2,15,16,17)/t10-;/m0./s1; Key:KAKYNGJFPXFCDD-PPHPATTJSA-N

Brinzolamide/brimonidine, sold under the brand name Simbrinza, is a fixed-dose combination medication used to reduce intra-ocular pressure (pressure inside the eye) in adults with ocular hypertension (high intra-ocular pressure) or in those with an eye condition known as open-angle glaucoma. It contains brinzolamide and brimonidine tartrate. It is used as an eye drop.

The most common side effects include ocular hyperaemia (red eye), allergic reactions in the eye, and dysgeusia (taste disturbances).

Open-angle glaucoma (a condition where the aqueous humour, the watery fluid inside the eyeball, cannot drain away properly) and other causes of high pressure in the eye increase the risk of damage to the retina and the optic nerve (the nerve that sends signals from the eye to the brain). This can result in serious vision loss and even blindness.

The active substances, brinzolamide and brimonidine tartrate, help to reduce intra-ocular pressure by reducing the production of aqueous humour. Brinzolamide works by blocking an enzyme called carbonic anhydrase, which produces bicarbonate needed for the production of the aqueous humour, while brimonidine tartrate blocks another enzyme known as adenylate cyclase, which is also involved in the production of the aqueous humour. Brimonidine also increases the drainage of aqueous humour from the front of the eye.

Brinzolamide/brimonidine was approved for medical use in the United States in April 2013, and in the European Union in July 2014.

== Medical uses ==
Brinzolamide/brimonidine is indicated to decrease of elevated intraocular pressure (IOP) in adults with open-angle glaucoma or ocular hypertension for whom monotherapy provides insufficient IOP reduction.

== History ==
Brinzolamide/brimonidine was approved for medical use in the United States in April 2013, and in the European Union in July 2014.
