= Tellimagrandin I =

Chemical compound

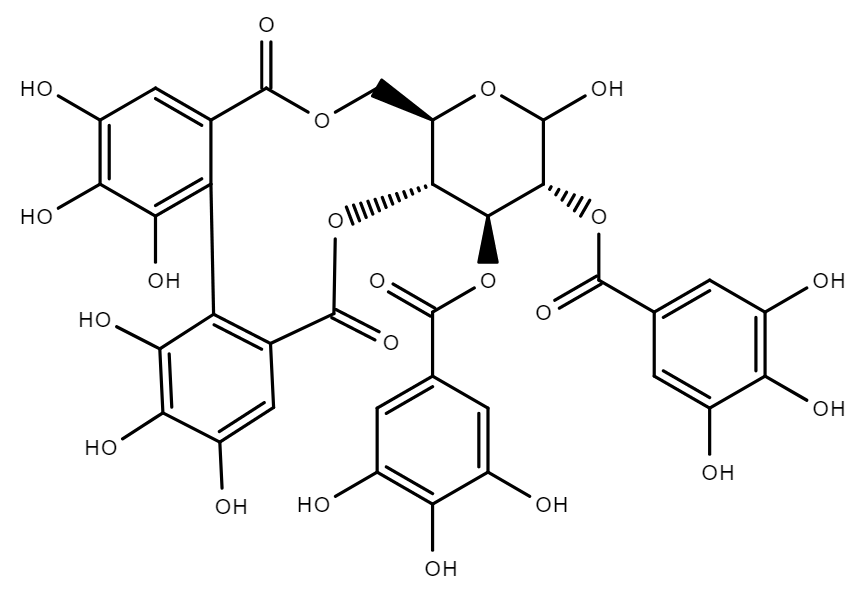
- Chemical structure of Tellimagrandin I

Names
- Systematic IUPAC name (11aR,13Ξ,14R,15S,15aR)-2,3,4,5,6,7,13-Heptahydroxy-9,17-dioxo-9,11,11a,13,14,15,15a,17-octahydrodibenzo[g,i]pyrano[3,2-b][1,5]dioxacycloundecine-14,15-diyl bis(3,4,5-trihydroxybenzoate)
- Other names 1-desgalloyleugeniin

Identifiers
CAS Number	79786-08-6
3D model (JSmol)	Interactive image
ChEBI	CHEBI:9433
ChEMBL	ChEMBL450376
ChemSpider	391047
KEGG	C10241
PubChem CID	442690
CompTox Dashboard (EPA)	DTXSID00229916
- InChI: InChI=1S/C34H26O22/c35-12-1-8(2-13(36)21(12)41)30(47)55-28-27-18(53-34(51)29(28)56-31(48)9-3-14(37)22(42)15(38)4-9)7-52-32(49)10-5-16(39)23(43)25(45)19(10)20-11(33(50)54-27)6-17(40)24(44)26(20)46/h1-6,18,27-29,34-46,51H,7H2/t18-,27-,28+,29-,34?/m1/s1 Key: YKDNTEQLKGYZHT-HTCCRONFSA-N
- SMILES: C1C2C(C(C(C(O2)O)OC(=O)C3=CC(=C(C(=C3)O)O)O)OC(=O)C4=CC(=C(C(=C4)O)O)O)OC(=O)C5=CC(=C(C(=C5C6=C(C(=C(C=C6C(=O)O1)O)O)O)O)O)O

Properties
Chemical formula	C_{34}H_{26}O_{22}
Molar mass	786.56 g/mol
- Except where otherwise noted, data are given for materials in their standard state (at 25 °C [77 °F], 100 kPa). Infobox references

Tellimagrandin I is an ellagitannin found in plants, such as Cornus canadensis, Eucalyptus globulus, Melaleuca styphelioides, Rosa rugosa, and walnut. It is composed of two galloyl and one hexahydroxydiphenyl groups bound to a glucose residue. It differs from Tellimagrandin II only by a hydroxyl group instead of a third galloyl group. It is also structurally similar to punigluconin and pedunculagin, two more ellagitannin monomers.

Tellimagrandin I has been shown to restore antioxidant enzyme activity in glucose- and oxalate-challenged rat cells and affects Cu(II)- and Fe(II)-dependent DNA strand breaks. It has hepatoprotective effects on carbon tetrachloride- and d-galactosamine-stressed HepG2 cells and enhances peroxisomal fatty acid beta-oxidation in liver, increasing mRNA expression of PPAR alpha, ACOX1, and CPT1A. It enhances gap junction communication and reduces tumor phenotype in HeLa cells and inhibits invasion of HSV-1 and HCV similar to eugeniin and casuarictin.

== See also ==
- Ellagitannin
- Pedunculagin
- Punigluconin
- Tellimagrandin II
