= Dorzolamide/timolol =

Combination medication

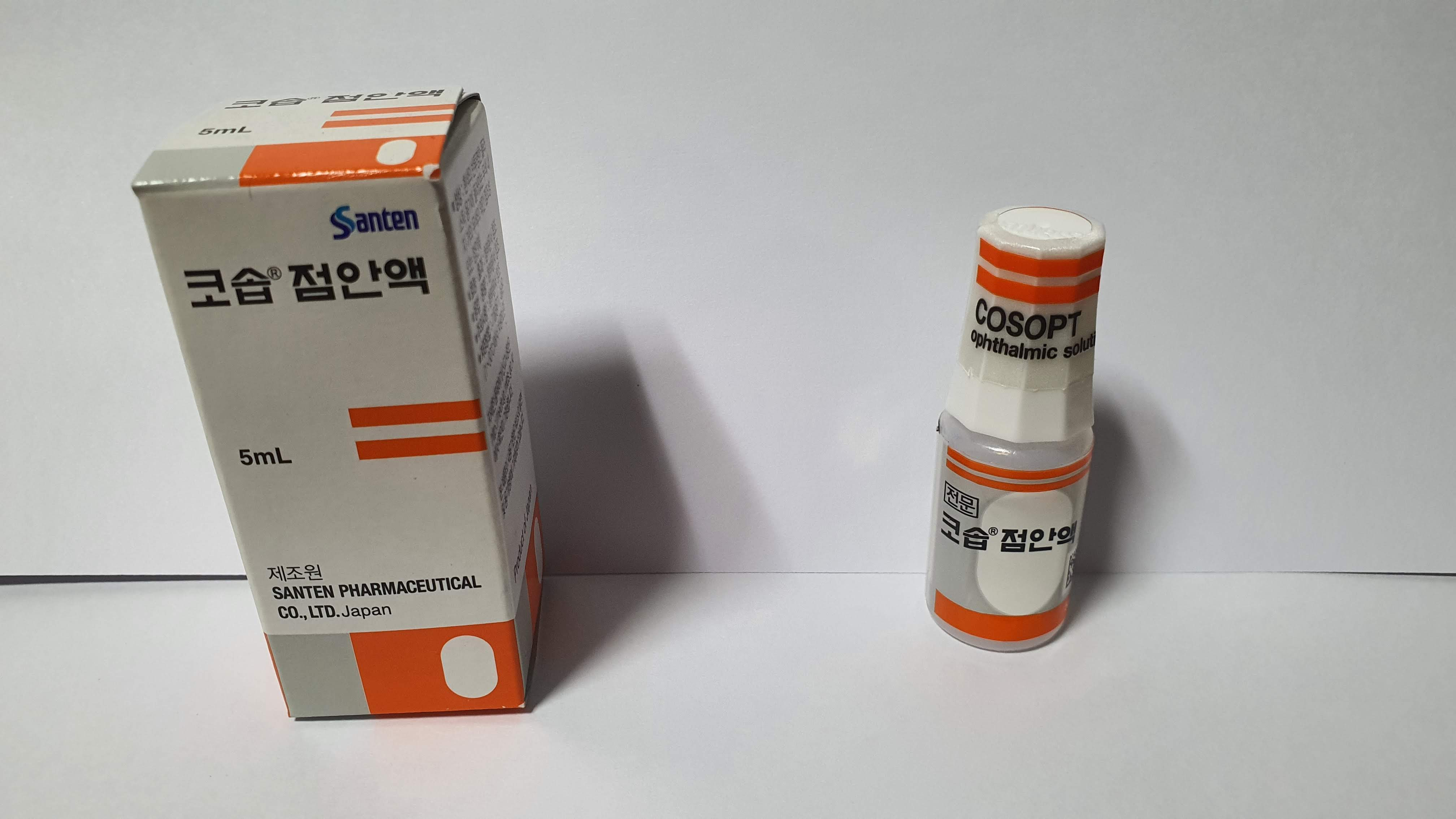

Combination of
- Dorzolamide hydrochloride: Carbonic anhydrase inhibitor
- Timolol maleate: Beta blocker

Clinical data
- Trade names: Cosopt, others
- AHFS/Drugs.com: FDA Professional Drug Information
- License data: US DailyMed: Dorzolamide and timolol
- Routes of administration: Eye drop
- ATC code: S01ED51 (WHO)

Legal status
- Legal status: AU: S4 (Prescription only); CA: ℞-only; US: ℞-only

Identifiers
- CAS Number: 146235-46-3
- PubChem CID: 56841571
- CompTox Dashboard (EPA): DTXSID50163331

Dorzolamide/timolol, sold under the brand name Cosopt among others, is a medication used to treat high pressure inside the eye including glaucoma. It is a combination of dorzolamide hydrochloride and timolol maleate. It may be used when a beta blocker, like timolol, is not sufficient alone. It is used as an eye drop.

Common side effects include eye discomfort, eye redness, taste changes, and blurry vision. Serious side effects may include allergic reactions and heart failure. Use is not recommended in those with asthma, a sulfonamide allergy, or a slow heart rate. Dorzolamide is a carbonic anhydrase inhibitor and timolol is a beta blocker. Both work by decreasing the amount of aqueous humor made by the eye.

The combination was approved for medical use in the United States in 1998. It is available as a generic medication. In 2023, it was the 229th most commonly prescribed medication in the United States, with more than 1 million prescriptions.

== Adverse effects ==
Common adverse effects include temporarily blurred vision, cloudy vision, double vision, temporary burning/stinging/itching of the eye, watery eyes, feeling as if something is in the eye, drooping eyelid, sensitivity to light, cough, flu symptoms, nausea, and stomach pain.

More serious adverse effects include dizziness, slow or irregular heartbeat, muscle weakness, mental/mood changes, and coldness/numbness/pain in the hands or feet.

== Pharmacology ==
Dorzolamide is a human carboanhydrase II inhibitor. Inhibition of carboanhydrase in the ciliary processes of the eye decreases aqueous humor secretion supposedly by decreasing the formation rate of bicarbonate ions. This results in reduction in both sodium and fluid transport.

Timolol is a non-selective beta-adrenergic antagonist.

== Comparison to other products ==
Despite each of the active ingredients being availed in their own respective formulations, combination formulations are typically more convenient for the patient without sacrificing any quality in therapy. In the case of Cosopt, the combination formulation dosed twice daily provides equivalent treatment to both dorzolamide 2% dosed two times daily and timolol 0.5% dosed three times daily. Specifically, the mean reduction in intraocular pressure was 27.4% for the combination product, 15.5% for dorzolamide 2%, and 22.2% for timolol 0.5%.

Compared to other products such as latanoprost, both are equally efficacious with regard to lowering intraocular pressure and getting patients to reach their target intraocular pressure. Cosopt, though, is typically less well tolerated than other treatments due to a well documented feeling of ocular burning upon administration.

== History ==
Cosopt gained Food and Drug Administration (FDA) approval in April 1998 and was supplied initially by Merck. In 2016, Merck & Co. had $95.3 billion in total assets, $40.3 billion in total equity, $24.3 billion in long term debt, and $13.4 billion in working capital. This same year Merck & Co spent $20 billion total split virtually evenly between research and development (R&D) and marketing efforts. Cosopt had annual sales of $342 million during the 12 months before June 2008. In September 2013, Merck & Co. sold the U.S. rights to their ophthalmic product line (including Cosopt) to Akorn Inc. for $52.8 million cash.

Upon the original patent expiration, Hi-Tech Pharma was the first of many generic competitors to submit an abbreviated new drug application (ANDA) for dorzolamide hydrochloride/timolol maleate eye drops. Hi-Tech Pharma's ANDA was approved on 28 October 2008. At the time, controversy surrounded the approval of this first ANDA. Hi-Tech sued the FDA for their right to 180 market exclusivity as laid out in the Hatch-Waxman Act. Apotex, another firm seeking an ANDA approval for generic Cosopt, argued that Hi-Tech "forfeited its rights to market exclusivity because it has failed to market the drug within 30 months of its ANDA submission or within 75 days after Merck withdrew its patent information." The FDA upheld their previous exclusivity decisions on acarbose and granisetron, allowing both Hi-Tech and Apotex to make a generic version of Cosopt. Soon after, ANDAs from Sandoz, Bausch & Laumb, Teva and others were also approved.

Just over a year before Merck sold their ophthalmic line to Akorn, Akorn developed a new formulation of dorzolamide hydrochloride/timolol maleate called Cosopt PF, which is simply a preservative free formulation of Cosopt.
