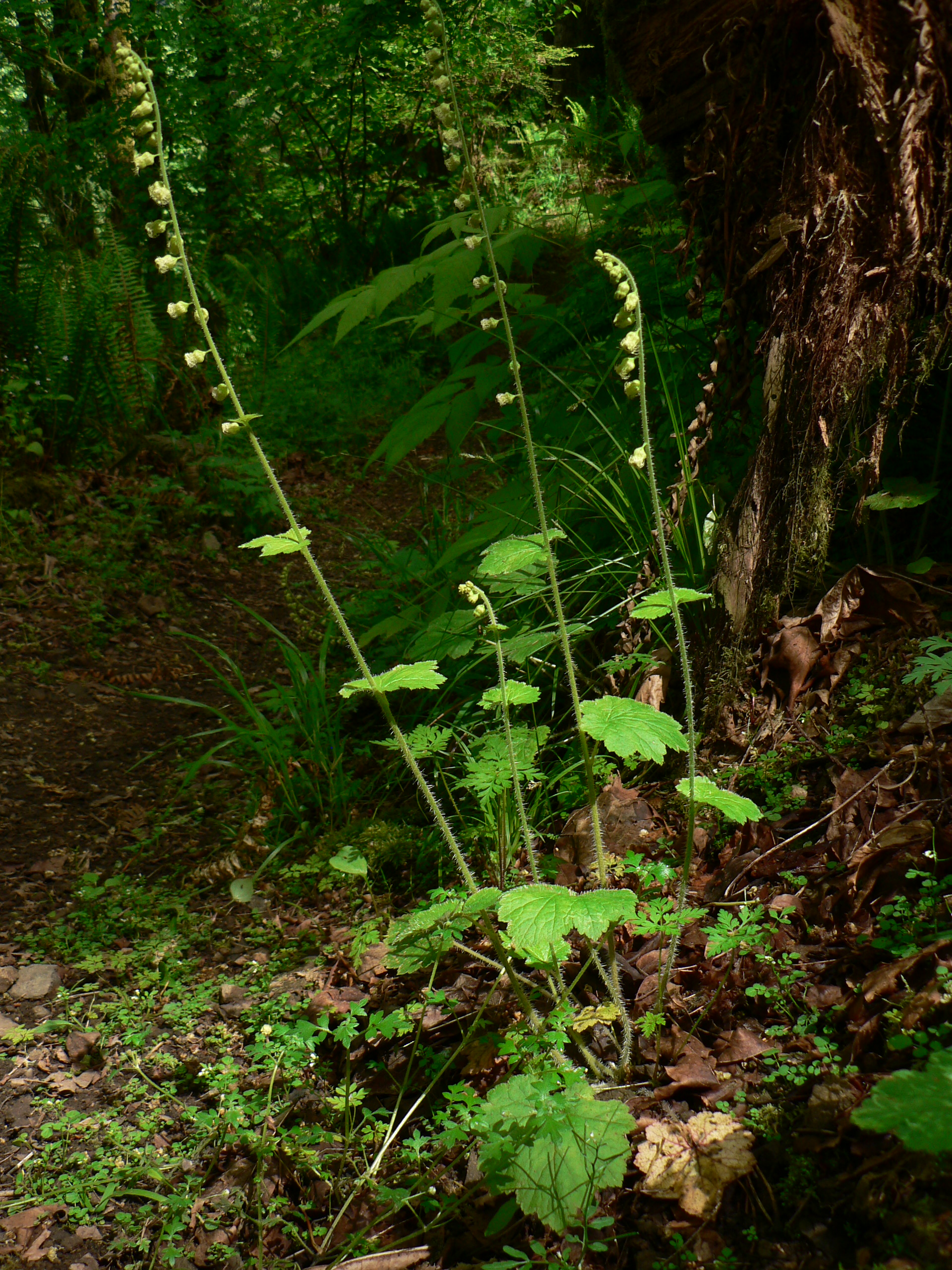

Conservation status
- Secure (NatureServe)

Scientific classification
- Kingdom: Plantae
- Clade: Embryophytes
- Clade: Tracheophytes
- Clade: Spermatophytes
- Clade: Angiosperms
- Clade: Eudicots
- Order: Saxifragales
- Family: Saxifragaceae
- Genus: Tellima; R.Br. (1823)
- Species: T. grandiflora

Binomial name
- Tellima grandiflora (Pursh) Dougl. ex Lindl. (1828)

Synonyms
- Mitella acerifolia Schltdl. (1844); Mitella grandiflora Pursh (1813) (basionym); Tellima breviflora Rydb. (1905); Tellima grandiflora var. virescens Regel (1867); Tellima nudicaulis Greene (1891); Tellima odorata Howell (1898); Tiarella alternifolia Fisch. ex Ser. (1830), not validly publ.

= Tellima =

Genus of flowering plants

Tellima grandiflora, the bigflower tellima or fringecups, is a herbaceous perennial flowering plant in the family Saxifragaceae. It is the only species in the genus Tellima.

== Description ==
It has rounded stalked leaves mostly growing from the base emerging from a rootstock and bluntly toothed reaching heights of 30 cm (12 in). It is evergreen in mild winters. Flowers are borne in spring and early summer, on spikes, terminal racemes, up to 60 cm (24 in) high. The green calyx is 6–8 mm long; the five flower petals are greenish-white to purple, pinnately divided and spreading. The petals are deeply fringed. It has 10 stamens and 2 styles.

== Distribution ==
The plant is a native of moist forests in western North America, from Alaska and British Columbia to northern California. It can be a garden escape and become naturalised in some other areas, e.g. Ireland and Great Britain. Although it is secure in the western portions of its range, Tellima grandiflora is listed as vulnerable in Idaho and Montana, and as critically imperiled in Alberta.

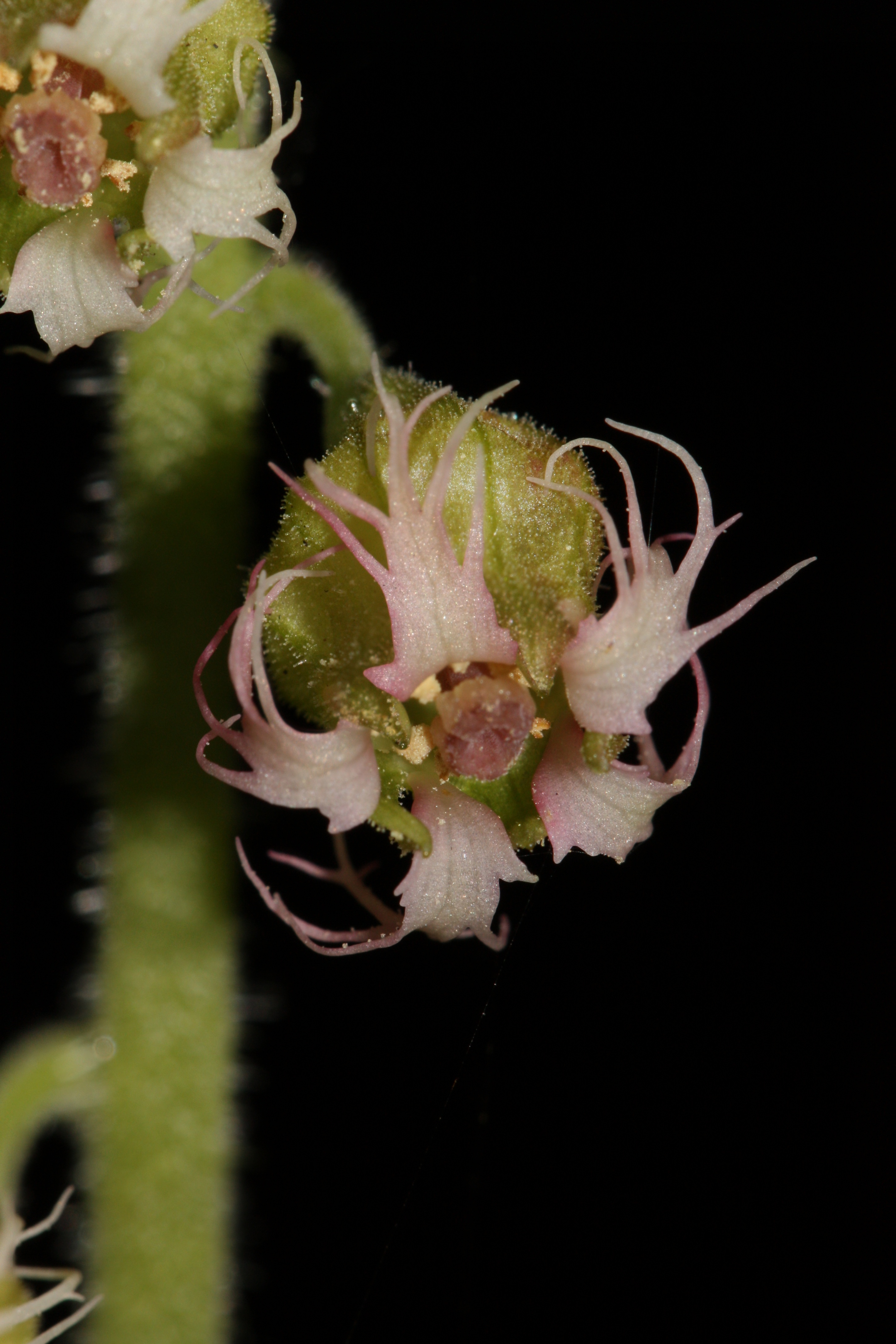

== Uses ==
It is widely grown in gardens. Different strains have been developed. It seeds itself freely in suitable climates.

This plant, crushed and made into an infusion, was used by the Skagit to aid people in sicknesses such as loss of appetite. Ellagitannins are chemical compounds that have potential antiviral activity. Tellimagrandin II, the first of the ellagitannins, formed from pentagalloyl glucose, is laccase-catalyzed dimerised to cornusiin E in T. grandiflora.
