= Luteic acid =

- Luteic acid

Names
- Preferred IUPAC name 3,4,8,9,10-Pentahydroxy-6-oxo-6H-dibenzo[b,d]pyran-1-carboxylic acid
- Other names Luteolic acid

Identifiers
CAS Number	476-67-5
3D model (JSmol)	Interactive image
ChemSpider	4477499
PubChem CID	5319108
UNII	B54CJS6VNV
CompTox Dashboard (EPA)	DTXSID90197216
- InChI: InChI=1S/C14H8O9/c15-5-2-4-7(11(19)9(5)17)8-3(13(20)21)1-6(16)10(18)12(8)23-14(4)22/h1-2,15-19H,(H,20,21) Key: FLZGFQFYDGHWLR-UHFFFAOYSA-N; InChI=1/C14H8O9/c15-5-2-4-7(11(19)9(5)17)8-3(13(20)21)1-6(16)10(18)12(8)23-14(4)22/h1-2,15-19H,(H,20,21) Key: FLZGFQFYDGHWLR-UHFFFAOYAI
- SMILES: C1=C2C(=C(C(=C1O)O)O)C3=C(C(=C(C=C3C(=O)O)O)O)OC2=O

Properties
Chemical formula	C_{14}H_{8}O_{9}
Molar mass	320.21 g/mol
- Except where otherwise noted, data are given for materials in their standard state (at 25 °C [77 °F], 100 kPa). Infobox references

Luteic acid is a natural phenol found in numerous fruits. It is a monolactonized tergalloyl group. Maximilian Nierenstein showed in 1945 that luteic acid was a molecule present in the myrobalanitannin, a tannin found in the fruit of Terminalia chebula and is an intermediary compound in the synthesis of ellagic acid. It can form from hexahydroxydiphenic acid. It is also present in the structure of the tannins alnusiin and bicornin.
