= Dorzolamide =

Chemical compound

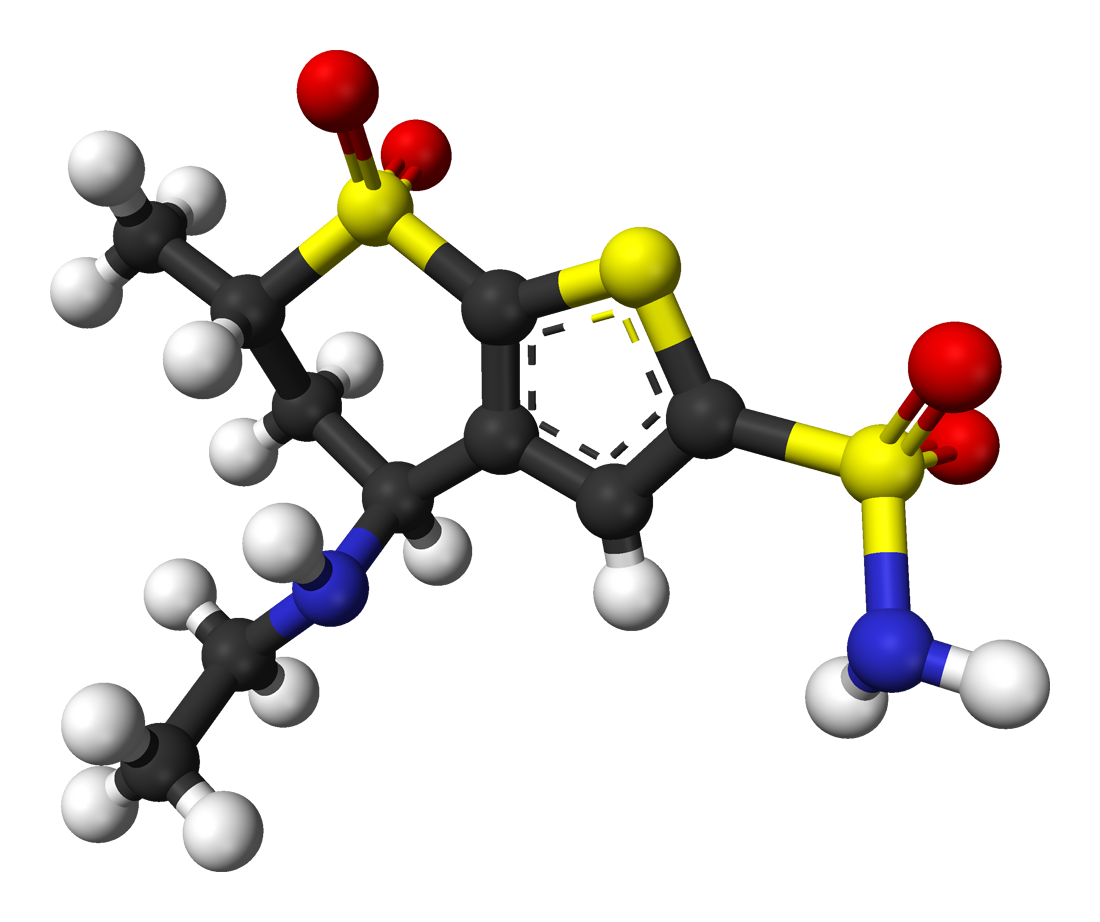

Clinical data
- Trade names: Trusopt, others
- AHFS/Drugs.com: Monograph
- MedlinePlus: a602022
- Routes of administration: eye drops
- ATC code: S01EC03 (WHO) S01EE52 (WHO)

Legal status
- Legal status: AU: S4 (Prescription only); CA: ℞-only; US: ℞-only

Pharmacokinetic data
- Protein binding: ~33%
- Elimination half-life: 4 months

Identifiers
- IUPAC name: (4S,6S)-4-(ethylamino)-6-methyl-5,6-dihydro-4H-7λ^{6}-thieno[2,3-b]thiopyran-2-sulfonamide-7,7-dioxide
- CAS Number: 120279-96-1; HCl: 130693-82-2
- PubChem CID: 5284549
- IUPHAR/BPS: 6810
- DrugBank: DB00869
- ChemSpider: 4447604
- UNII: 9JDX055TW1; HCl: QZO5366EW7
- KEGG: D07871
- ChEBI: CHEBI:4702
- ChEMBL: ChEMBL218490
- CompTox Dashboard (EPA): DTXSID7022960
- ECHA InfoCard: 100.229.271

Chemical and physical data
- Formula: C_{10}H_{16}N_{2}O_{4}S_{3}
- Molar mass: 324.43 g·mol^{−1}
- 3D model (JSmol): Interactive image
- SMILES: CCNC1CC(C)S(=O)(=O)c2sc(cc12)S(=O)(=O)N
- InChI: InChI=1S/C10H16N2O4S3/c1-3-12-8-4-6(2)18(13,14)10-7(8)5-9(17-10)19(11,15)16/h5-6,8,12H,3-4H2,1-2H3,(H2,11,15,16)/t6-,8-/m0/s1; Key:IAVUPMFITXYVAF-XPUUQOCRSA-N

Dorzolamide, sold under the brand name Trusopt among others, is a medication used to treat high pressure inside the eye, including in cases of glaucoma. It is used as an eye drop. Effects begin within three hours and last for at least eight hours. It is also available as the combination dorzolamide/timolol.

Common side effects include eye discomfort, eye redness, taste changes, and blurry vision. Serious side effects include Steven Johnson syndrome. Those allergic to sulfonamides may be allergic to dorzolamide. Use is not recommended in pregnancy or breastfeeding. It is a carbonic anhydrase inhibitor and works by decreasing the production of aqueous humor.

Dorzolamide was approved for medical use in the United States in 1994. It is available as a generic medication. In 2023, it was the 190th most commonly prescribed medication in the United States, with more than 2 million prescriptions.

== Medical uses ==
Dorzolamide is used to lower excessive intraocular pressure in open-angle glaucoma and ocular hypertension. This drug is able to cross the cornea, reach the ciliary body of the eye, and produce systemic effects on the carbonic anhydrase enzyme within the eye.

== Side effects ==
Ocular stinging, burning, itching and bitter taste. It causes shallowing of the anterior chamber and leads to transient myopia. As a second generation carbonic anhydrase inhibitor, dorzolamide avoids systemic effects associated with first generation carbonic anhydrase inhibitors such as acetazolamide, methazolamide, and dichlorphenamide.

== Pharmacology ==
=== Pharmacodynamics ===
Dorzolamide lowers intraocular pressure by about 20%. Normally, carbonic anhydrase converts carbonic acid (H_{2}CO_{3}) into bicarbonate (HCO_{3}), releasing a proton (H^{+}) into solution. The H^{+} is then exchanged for sodium (Na^{+}) ions, which facilitates the production of aqueous humor. By blocking the function of carbonic anhydrase, the Na^{+}/H^{+} exchange is unable to occur, which leads to a decrease in Na^{+} in the cell and prevents aqueous humor production.

Dorzolamide is a highly specific inhibitor of carbonic anhydrase II, which is an isoenzyme of carbonic anhydrase. Dorzolamide displays a 4000-fold higher affinity for carbonic anhydrase II than carbonic anhydrase I.

=== Pharmacokinetics ===
When applied topically, dorzolamide enters systemic circulation. As a result, dorzolamide can inhibit carbonic anhydrase found in various parts of the body. During chronic dosing, the drug accumulates in red blood cells. Dorzolamide also binds moderately (approximately 33%) to plasma proteins. However, plasma concentrations are low, generally below 15 nM. The drug and its metabolite are primarily excreted in urine. After dosing is complete, the drug concentration in the blood decreases nonlinearly.

== History ==
Dorzolamide, developed by Merck, was the first medication in human therapy (market introduction 1995) that resulted from structure-based drug design. It was developed to circumvent the systemic side effects of acetazolamide which has to be taken orally.
