= Nierenstein reaction =

Chemical reaction

| Named after | Maximilian Nierenstein |
| Reaction type | Carbon-carbon bond forming reaction |

The Nierenstein reaction is an organic reaction describing the conversion of an acid chloride into a haloketone with diazomethane. It is an insertion reaction in that the methylene group from the diazomethane is inserted into the carbon-chlorine bond of the acid chloride.

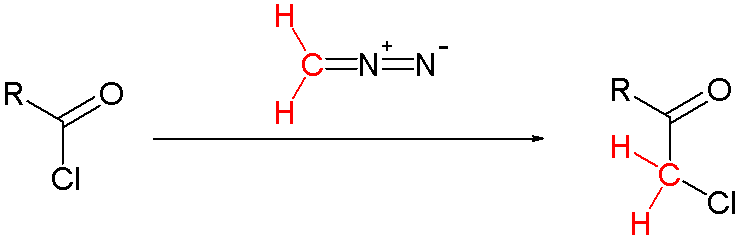
The Nierenstein reaction

== Reaction mechanism ==
The reaction proceeds through a diazonium salt intermediate formed when diazomethyl anion displaces the chloride:

The Nierenstein reaction mechanism

Excess diazomethane can act as a base, abstracting a hydrogen from the diazonium intermediate. The results are a neutral diazoketone, which does not react further; and methyldiazonium chloride, which decomposes to chloromethane. The unreactive diazoketone can, however, be re-activated with hydrogen chloride to give the Nierenstein product:

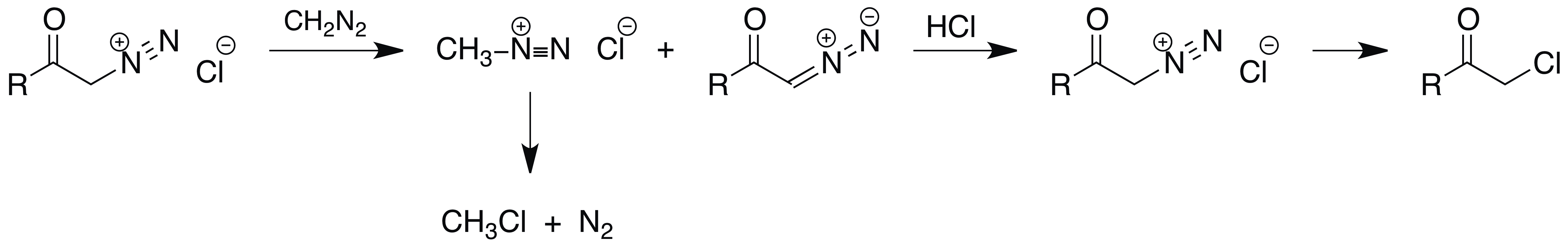
The Nierenstein reaction mechanism

In even some cases with limited diazomethane, the reaction process can stall into the diazoketone pathway, requiring reparative HCl gas. Substitution of a mixed anhydride for the acyl halide also gives the diazoketone.

== Examples ==
Nierenstein's original 1924 publication:

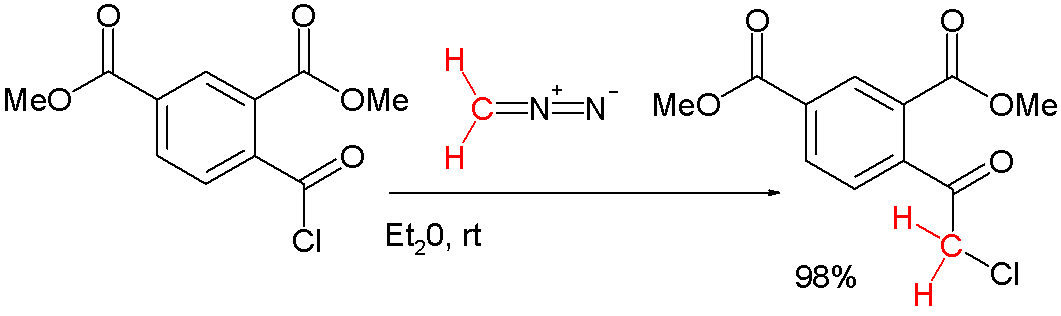
Nierenstein 1924

A reaction from benzoyl bromide going haywire and forming the dioxane dimer:

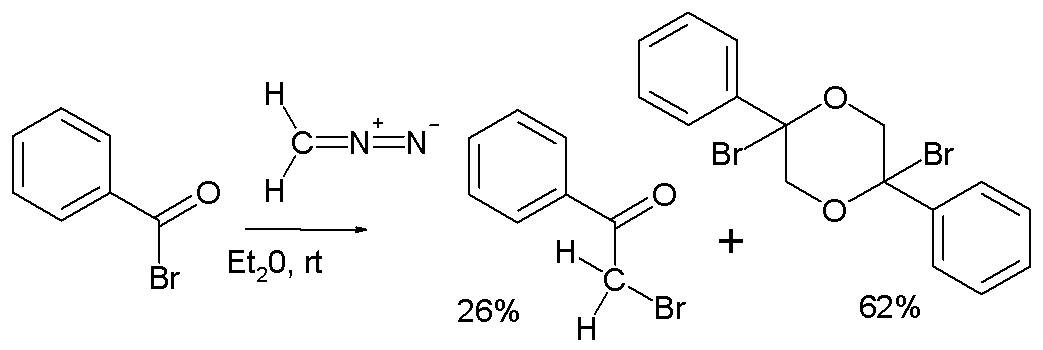
Nierenstein 1924

== See also ==
- Maximilian Nierenstein
- Curtius rearrangement
- Wolff rearrangement
- Arndt–Eistert reaction: where acid chlorides react with diazomethane to give chain extended carboxylic acids via a rearrangement
