= Granatin A =

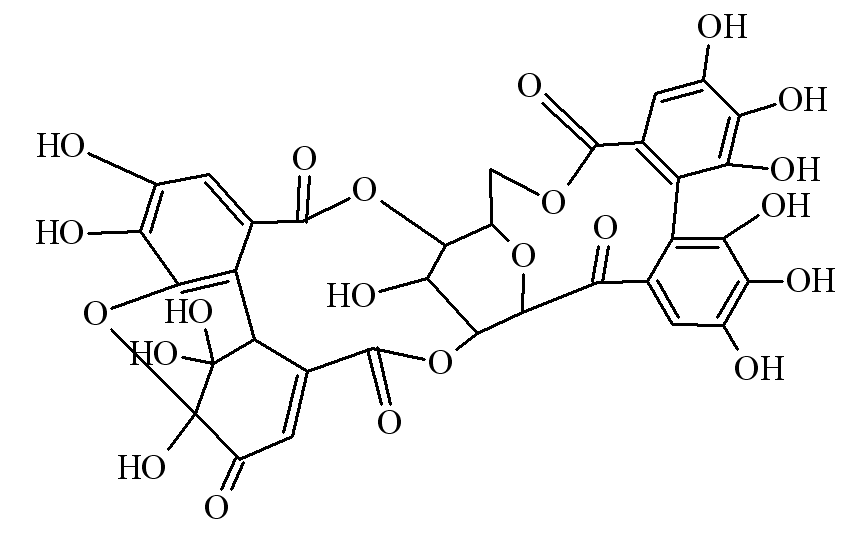
- Chemical structure of granatin A

Names
- IUPAC name 6,7,8,11,12,13,25,26,30,30,31,37-Dodecahydroxy-17,21,36,38,39-pentaoxaoctacyclo[18.16.1.1^{2,19}.1^{27,31}.0^{4,9}.0^{10,15}.0^{23,28}.0^{29,34}]nonatriaconta-4,6,8,10,12,14,23,25,27,33-decaene-3,16,22,32,3 5-pentone

Identifiers
CAS Number	161205-11-4
3D model (JSmol)	Interactive image
ChemSpider	35014772
PubChem CID	131752596
- InChI: InChI=1S/C34H24O22/c35-10-1-6-15(23(43)20(10)40)16-7(2-11(36)21(41)24(16)44)30(46)52-5-13-26-25(45)29(28(53-13)19(6)39)55-32(48)9-4-14(38)34(51)33(49,50)18(9)17-8(31(47)54-26)3-12(37)22(42)27(17)56-34/h1-4,13,18,25-26,28-29,35-37,40-45,49-51H,5H2 Key: BEAQEKRAXFQCBO-UHFFFAOYSA-N
- SMILES: C1C2C3C(C(C(O2)C(=O)C4=CC(=C(C(=C4C5=C(C(=C(C=C5C(=O)O1)O)O)O)O)O)O)OC(=O)C6=CC(=O)C7(C(C6C8=C(O7)C(=C(C=C8C(=O)O3)O)O)(O)O)O)O

Properties
Chemical formula	C_{34}H_{24}O_{22}
Molar mass	784.54 g/mol
- Except where otherwise noted, data are given for materials in their standard state (at 25 °C [77 °F], 100 kPa). Infobox references

Granatin A is an ellagitannin found in the pericarp of Punica granatum (pomegranate). It is a weak carbonic anhydrase inhibitor.
