= Alnusiin =

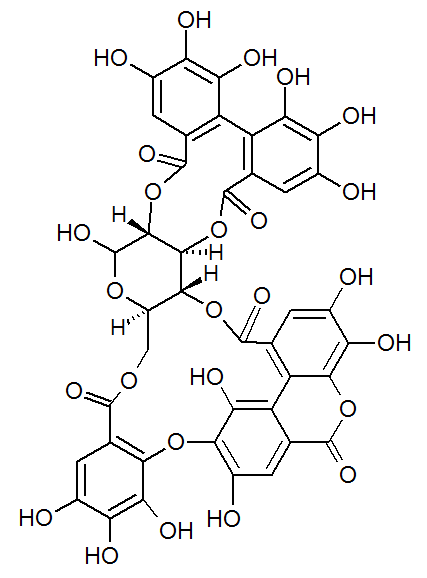
- Chemical structure of alnusiin

Identifiers
CAS Number	78836-99-4
3D model (JSmol)	Interactive image
ChemSpider	4445026
PubChem CID	5281709
CompTox Dashboard (EPA)	DTXSID701000072
- InChI: InChI=1S/C41H26O26/c42-12-1-7-18(26(51)22(12)47)19-8(2-13(43)23(48)27(19)52)39(58)67-35-34(66-38(7)57)32-17(62-41(35)60)6-61-36(55)11-5-14(44)24(49)29(54)30(11)63-31-16(46)4-9-20(28(31)53)21-10(40(59)64-32)3-15(45)25(50)33(21)65-37(9)56/h1-5,17,32,34-35,41-54,60H,6H2/t17-,32-,34+,35-,41?/m1/s1 Key: OAZHOQDMOPZBMN-RBKPYHMISA-N; InChI=1/C41H26O26/c42-12-1-7-18(26(51)22(12)47)19-8(2-13(43)23(48)27(19)52)39(58)67-35-34(66-38(7)57)32-17(62-41(35)60)6-61-36(55)11-5-14(44)24(49)29(54)30(11)63-31-16(46)4-9-20(28(31)53)21-10(40(59)64-32)3-15(45)25(50)33(21)65-37(9)56/h1-5,17,32,34-35,41-54,60H,6H2/t17-,32-,34+,35-,41?/m1/s1 Key: OAZHOQDMOPZBMN-RBKPYHMIBF
- SMILES: C1C2C(C3C(C(O2)O)OC(=O)C4=CC(=C(C(=C4C5=C(C(=C(C=C5C(=O)O3)O)O)O)O)O)O)OC(=O)C6=CC(=C(C7=C6C8=C(C(=C(C=C8C(=O)O7)O)OC9=C(C(=C(C=C9C(=O)O1)O)O)O)O)O)O

Properties
Chemical formula	C_{41}H_{26}O_{26}
Molar mass	934.63 g/mol
- Except where otherwise noted, data are given for materials in their standard state (at 25 °C [77 °F], 100 kPa). Infobox references

Alnusiin is an ellagitannin found in Alnus sieboldiana.

The molecules of gallic acid, luteic acid and hexahydroxydiphenic acid are present in the structure of alnusiin, bound to a glucose residue.
