= Cornusiin E =

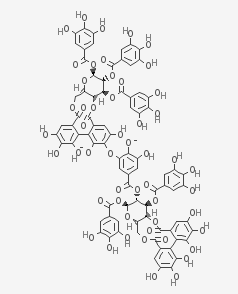

Identifiers
3D model (JSmol)	Interactive image; Interactive image
ChemSpider	58837274
PubChem CID	91820328
CompTox Dashboard (EPA)	DTXSID701336051
- InChI: InChI=1S/C82H58O52/c83-28-1-18(2-29(84)49(28)97)71(112)129-67-65-43(125-81(133-74(115)21-7-34(89)52(100)35(90)8-21)69(67)131-73(114)20-5-32(87)51(99)33(88)6-20)16-123-77(118)24-12-39(94)55(103)60(108)46(24)48-26(79(120)128-65)15-42(58(106)62(48)110)124-64-27(14-41(96)57(105)63(64)111)80(121)132-70-68(130-72(113)19-3-30(85)50(98)31(86)4-19)66-44(126-82(70)134-75(116)22-9-36(91)53(101)37(92)10-22)17-122-76(117)23-11-38(93)54(102)59(107)45(23)47-25(78(119)127-66)13-40(95)56(104)61(47)109/h1-15,43-44,65-70,81-111H,16-17H2/t43-,44-,65-,66-,67+,68+,69-,70-,81+,82+/m1/s1 Key: DPFDPBNAIOIBJC-YLVKXZTISA-N
- SMILES: C1[C@@H]2[C@H]([C@@H]([C@H]([C@@H](O2)OC(=O)C3=CC(=C(C(=C3)O)O)O)OC(=O)C4=CC(=C(C(=C4)O)O)O)OC(=O)C5=CC(=C(C(=C5)O)O)O)OC(=O)C6=CC(=C(C(=C6C7=C(C(=C(C=C7C(=O)O1)O)O)O)O)O)OC8=C(C(=C(C=C8C(=O)O[C@@H]9[C@H]([C@H]1[C@@H](COC(=O)C2=CC(=C(C(=C2C2=C(C(=C(C=C2C(=O)O1)O)O)O)O)O)O)O[C@H]9OC(=O)C1=CC(=C(C(=C1)O)O)O)OC(=O)C1=CC(=C(C(=C1)O)O)O)O)O)O; C1[C@@H]2[C@H]([C@@H]([C@H]([C@@H](O2)OC(=O)C3=CC(=C(C(=C3)O)O)O)OC(=O)C4=CC(=C(C(=C4)O)O)O)OC(=O)C5=CC(=C(C(=C5)O)O)O)OC(=O)C6=CC(=C(C(=C6C7=C(C(=C(C=C7C(=O)O1)O)O)O)O)OC8=CC(=CC(=C8O)O)C(=O)O[C@@H]9[C@H]([C@H]1[C@@H](COC(=O)C2=CC(=C(C(=C2C2=C(C(=C(C=C2C(=O)O1)O)O)O)O)O)O)O[C@H]9OC(=O)C1=CC(=C(C(=C1)O)O)O)OC(=O)C1=CC(=C(C(=C1)O)O)O)O

Properties
Chemical formula	C_{82}H_{56}O_{51}
Molar mass	1857.29 g/mol
- Except where otherwise noted, data are given for materials in their standard state (at 25 °C [77 °F], 100 kPa). Infobox references

Cornusiin E is a dimeric derivative of tellimagrandin II found in Tellima grandiflora.
