= Brinzolamide =

Chemical compound

Clinical data
- Pronunciation: brin ZOH la mide
- Trade names: Azopt
- Other names: (5R)-5-ethylamino-3-(3-methoxypropyl)-2,2-dioxo-2λ^{6},9-dithia-3-azabicyclo[4.3.0]nona-7,10-diene-8-sulfonamide
- AHFS/Drugs.com: Monograph
- MedlinePlus: a601233
- License data: US DailyMed: Brinzolamide
- Pregnancy category: AU: B3
- Routes of administration: Ophthalmic
- ATC code: S01EC04 (WHO)

Legal status
- Legal status: AU: S4 (Prescription only); US: ℞-only; EU: Rx-only

Pharmacokinetic data
- Bioavailability: Absorbed systemically, but below detectable levels (less than 10 ng/mL)
- Protein binding: ~60%
- Elimination half-life: 111 days
- Excretion: Kidney (60%)

Identifiers
- IUPAC name: (4R)-4-(ethylamino)-2-(3-methoxypropyl)-1,1-dioxo-3,4-dihydro-1λ^{6}-thieno[3,2-e]thiazine-6-sulfonamide
- CAS Number: 138890-62-7
- PubChem CID: 68844
- IUPHAR/BPS: 6797
- DrugBank: DB01194
- ChemSpider: 62077
- UNII: 9451Z89515
- KEGG: D00652
- ChEBI: CHEBI:3176
- ChEMBL: ChEMBL220491
- CompTox Dashboard (EPA): DTXSID6045531
- ECHA InfoCard: 100.149.376

Chemical and physical data
- Formula: C_{12}H_{21}N_{3}O_{5}S_{3}
- Molar mass: 383.50 g·mol^{−1}
- 3D model (JSmol): Interactive image
- SMILES: O=S(=O)(c1sc2c(c1)[C@@H](NCC)CN(CCCOC)S2(=O)=O)N
- InChI: InChI=1S/C12H21N3O5S3/c1-3-14-10-8-15(5-4-6-20-2)23(18,19)12-9(10)7-11(21-12)22(13,16)17/h7,10,14H,3-6,8H2,1-2H3,(H2,13,16,17)/t10-/m0/s1; Key:HCRKCZRJWPKOAR-JTQLQIEISA-N

Brinzolamide (trade name Azopt) is a carbonic anhydrase inhibitor used to lower intraocular pressure in patients with open-angle glaucoma or ocular hypertension.

Brinzolamide was approved as a generic medication in the United States in November 2020.

== Chemistry ==
Brinzolamide is a carbonic anhydrase inhibitor (specifically, carbonic anhydrase II). Carbonic anhydrase is found primarily in erythrocytes (but also in other tissues including the eye). It exists as a number of isoenzymes, the most active of which is carbonic anhydrase II (CA-II).

== Indications ==
Use for the treatment of open-angle glaucoma and raised intraocular pressure due to either excess aqueous humor production or inadequate drainage of the humor via the trabecular meshwork.

== Pharmacodynamics ==
Inhibition of carbonic anhydrase in the ciliary processes of the eye decreases aqueous humor secretion and thus lowers the intraocular pressure in the anterior chamber, presumably by reducing the rate of formation of bicarbonate ions with subsequent reduction in sodium and fluid transport; this may alleviate the effects of open-angle glaucoma.

== Pharmacokinetics ==
=== Absorption ===
The recommended frequency for topical application is two times per day. Following ocular instillation, the suspension is systemically absorbed to some degree; however the plasma concentrations are low and generally below the limits of detection (less than 10 ng/mL) due to extensive binding by tissues and erythrocytes. Oral administration is less-favored due to variable absorption from the stomach mucosa and an increased side-effect profile versus ophthalmic administration.

=== Distribution ===
The compound is fairly well protein-bound (60%), but adheres extensively to the carbonic anhydrase-containing erythrocytes. Due to the abundance of readily-bound erythrocytes and minimal known metabolism, Brinzolamide's whole blood half-life is very long (111 days).

=== Metabolism ===
While definitive sites of metabolism have not been firmly established, there are several metabolites worthy of note. N-Desethylbrinzolamide is an active metabolite of the parent compound, and thus exhibits carbonic anhydrase inhibitory activity (largely carbonic anhydrase-I, when in the presence of Brinzolamide) and also accumulates in the erythrocytes. However, Brinzolamide's other known metabolites (N-Desmethoxypropylbrinzolamide and O-Desmethylbrinzolamide) either have no activity or their activity is currently unknown.

=== Excretion ===
Brinzolamide is excreted primarily unchanged (60%) in the urine, although the renal clearance rate has not been definitively determined. N-Desethylbrinzolamide is also found in the urine along with lower concentrations of the inactive metabolites, N-Desmethoxypropylbrinzolamide and O-Desmethylbrinzolamide; exact levels have not been definitively determined.

== Cautions ==
=== Side effects ===
- Common, but mild: blurred vision; bitter, sour, or unusual taste; itching, pain, watering, or dryness of the eyes; feeling that something is in the eye; headache; runny nose
- Rare, but serious: fast or irregular heartbeat; fainting; skin rash, hives, or itching; severe eye irritation, redness, or swelling; swelling in the face, lips, or throat; wheezing or trouble breathing

=== Precautions ===
- Hypersensitivity to other sulfonamides
- Acute angle-closure glaucoma
- Concomitant administration of oral carbonic anhydrase inhibitors
- Moderate-to-severe chronic kidney disease or liver disease

== Combinations ==
=== With timolol ===
The combination of brinzolamide with timolol is marketed under the trade name Azarga. This combination may be more effective than either medication alone.

=== With brimonidine ===
The combination of brinzolamide with brimonidine is marketed under the trade name Simbrinza. This combination may be more effective than either medication alone.
