= Maximilian Nierenstein =

German biochemist (1877–1946)

- Born: 1877; Dinaburg, Vitebsk Governorate, Russian Empire
- Died: 1946 (aged 68–69)
- Education: University of Bern
- Known for: Nierenstein reaction
- Scientific career
- Fields: Biochemistry
- Workplaces: University of Bristol
- Thesis: Synthese des 2-Oxyflavonols

Maximilian Nierenstein (also known as Moses Max Nierenstein or Max Nierenstein; 1877–1946) was a Russian-born British biochemist, professor at the University of Bristol.

He is known for the Nierenstein reaction, an organic reaction describing the conversion of an acid chloride into an haloketone with diazomethane.

In 1912, Polish biochemist Casimir Funk isolated a complex of micronutrients and proposed the complex be named "vitamine" (a portmanteau of "vital amine"), a name reportedly suggested by friend Max Nierenstein.

He also studied natural phenols and tannins found in different plant species. He showed in 1945 that luteic acid, a molecule present in the myrobalanitannin, a tannin found in the fruit of Terminalia chebula, is an intermediary compound in the synthesis of ellagic acid. Working with Arthur George Perkin, he prepared ellagic acid from algarobilla and certain other fruits in 1905. He suggested its formation from galloyl-glycine by Penicillium in 1915. Tannase is an enzyme that Niederstein used to produce m-digallic acid from gallotannins. He proved the presence of catechin in cocoa beans in 1931.

He also worked on milk and caseinogen. He reviewed the discovery of lactose in 1936.

== Works ==
- Nierenstein, Moses Max (1904). Synthese des 2-Oxyflavonols.
- Moore, Benjamin; Nierenstein, Maximilian; Todd, John Lancelot; Liverpool School of Tropical Medicine (1908). Concerning the Treatment of Experimental Trypanosomiasis.
- Nierenstein, Maximilian (1910). Chemie der Gerbstoffe.
- Nierenstein, M (1912). Organische Arsenverbindungen und ihre chemotherapeutische Bedeutung.
- Nierenstein, M (1932). Incunabula of tannin chemistry: A collection of some early papers on the chemistry of the tannins reproduced in facsimile and published with annotations.
- Nierenstein, Maximilian; Skene, Macgregor (1934). The Natural Organic Tannins: History, Chemistry, Distribution.
