= Bicornin =

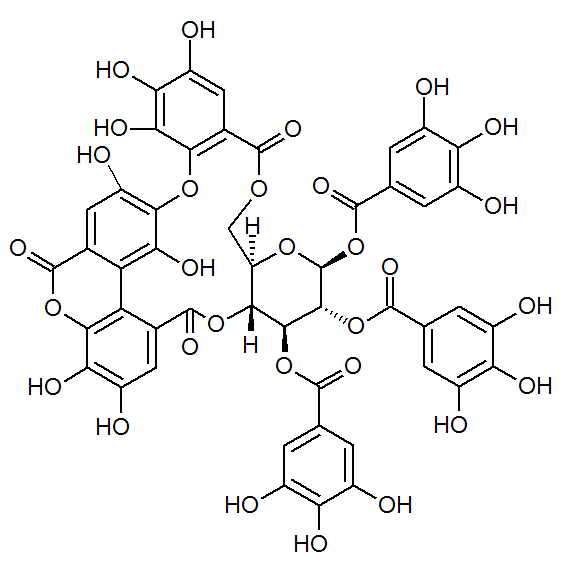
- Chemical structure of bicornin

Identifiers
CAS Number	124854-12-2
3D model (JSmol)	Interactive image
ChemSpider	28190824
PubChem CID	71308161
CompTox Dashboard (EPA)	DTXSID40745428
- InChI: InChI=1S/C48H32O30/c49-17-1-11(2-18(50)29(17)58)42(65)76-40-38-26(72-48(78-44(67)13-5-21(53)31(60)22(54)6-13)41(40)77-43(66)12-3-19(51)30(59)20(52)4-12)10-71-45(68)16-9-23(55)32(61)35(64)36(16)73-37-25(57)8-14-27(34(37)63)28-15(47(70)74-38)7-24(56)33(62)39(28)75-46(14)69/h1-9,26,38,40-41,48-64H,10H2/t26-,38-,40-,41-,48+/m1/s1 Key: DOTJYWQAPHIAIF-TWNAEOARSA-N; InChI=1/C48H32O30/c49-17-1-11(2-18(50)29(17)58)42(65)76-40-38-26(72-48(78-44(67)13-5-21(53)31(60)22(54)6-13)41(40)77-43(66)12-3-19(51)30(59)20(52)4-12)10-71-45(68)16-9-23(55)32(61)35(64)36(16)73-37-25(57)8-14-27(34(37)63)28-15(47(70)74-38)7-24(56)33(62)39(28)75-46(14)69/h1-9,26,38,40-41,48-64H,10H2/t26-,38-,40-,41-,48+/m1/s1 Key: DOTJYWQAPHIAIF-TWNAEOARBX
- SMILES: c1c(cc(c(c1O)O)O)C(=O)O[C@@H]2[C@H]3[C@@H](COC(=O)c4cc(c(c(c4Oc5c(cc6c(c5O)c7c(cc(c(c7oc6=O)O)O)C(=O)O3)O)O)O)O)O[C@H]([C@@H]2OC(=O)c8cc(c(c(c8)O)O)O)OC(=O)c9cc(c(c(c9)O)O)O

Properties
Chemical formula	C_{48}H_{32}O_{30}
Molar mass	1088.754 g·mol^{−1}
- Except where otherwise noted, data are given for materials in their standard state (at 25 °C [77 °F], 100 kPa). Infobox references

Bicornin is an ellagitannin found in plants of the order Myrtales, including Trapa bicornis (water caltrop) and Syzygium aromaticum (clove).

The molecule contains a luteic acid group.
