= Strictinin =

Names
- IUPAC name β-D-Glucopyranose 4,6-(4,4′,5,5′,6,6′-hexahydroxy[1,1′-biphenyl]-2,2′-dicarboxylate) 1-(3,4,5-trihydroxybenzoate)
- Systematic IUPAC name (11aR,13S,14R,15R,15aS)-2,3,4,5,6,7,14,15-Octahydroxy-9,17-dioxo-9,11,11a,13,14,15,15a,17-octahydrodibenzo[g,i]pyrano[3,2-b][1,5]dioxacycloundecin-13-yl 3,4,5-trihydroxybenzoate

Identifiers
CAS Number	517-46-4
3D model (JSmol)	Interactive image
ChemSpider	66059
PubChem CID	73330
CompTox Dashboard (EPA)	DTXSID30965971
- InChI: InChI=1S/C27H22O18/c28-9-1-6(2-10(29)16(9)32)24(39)45-27-22(38)21(37)23-13(43-27)5-42-25(40)7-3-11(30)17(33)19(35)14(7)15-8(26(41)44-23)4-12(31)18(34)20(15)36/h1-4,13,21-23,27-38H,5H2/t13-,21-,22-,23-,27+/m1/s1 Key: FYIJLTSMNXUNLT-CXQFPWCTSA-N; InChI=1/C27H22O18/c28-9-1-6(2-10(29)16(9)32)24(39)45-27-22(38)21(37)23-13(43-27)5-42-25(40)7-3-11(30)17(33)19(35)14(7)15-8(26(41)44-23)4-12(31)18(34)20(15)36/h1-4,13,21-23,27-38H,5H2/t13-,21-,22-,23-,27+/m1/s1 Key: FYIJLTSMNXUNLT-CXQFPWCTBJ
- SMILES: C1[C@@H]2[C@H]([C@@H]([C@H]([C@@H](O2)OC(=O)C3=CC(=C(C(=C3)O)O)O)O)O)OC(=O)C4=CC(=C(C(=C4C5=C(C(=C(C=C5C(=O)O1)O)O)O)O)O)O

Properties
Chemical formula	C_{27}H_{22}O_{18}
Molar mass	634.455 g·mol^{−1}
- Except where otherwise noted, data are given for materials in their standard state (at 25 °C [77 °F], 100 kPa). Infobox references

Strictinin is a bioactive chemical of the ellagitannin family of hydrolyzable tannins. This compound shows activity against influenza virus.
