= Punicafolin =

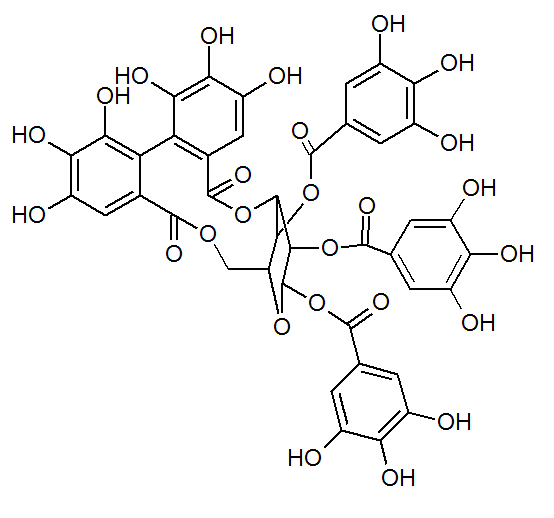
- Chemical structure of punicafolin

Names
- Other names 1,2,4-tri-O-galloyl-3,6-(R)-hexahydroxydiphenoyl-β-D-glucose

Identifiers
CAS Number	88847-11-4
3D model (JSmol)	Interactive image
ChEMBL	ChEMBL507308
ChemSpider	4478779
PubChem CID	5320800
UNII	3Q4JL5CY7N
CompTox Dashboard (EPA)	DTXSID101030158
- InChI: InChI=1S/C41H30O26/c42-15-1-10(2-16(43)26(15)50)36(57)64-33-23-9-62-39(60)13-7-21(48)29(53)31(55)24(13)25-14(8-22(49)30(54)32(25)56)40(61)65-34(33)35(66-37(58)11-3-17(44)27(51)18(45)4-11)41(63-23)67-38(59)12-5-19(46)28(52)20(47)6-12/h1-8,23,33-35,41-56H,9H2/t23-,33-,34+,35-,41+/m1/s1 Key: DPBVYZVSXAZMAY-UUUCSUBKSA-N
- SMILES: Oc4c(O)cc(cc4O)C(=O)OC6C(OC(=O)c(cc1O)c-5c(O)c1O)C(OC(=O)c(cc7O)cc(O)c7O)C(OC(=O)c(cc3O)cc(O)c3O)OC6COC(=O)c(cc(O)c2O)c-5c2O

Properties
Chemical formula	C_{41}H_{30}O_{26}
Molar mass	938.63 g/mol
- Except where otherwise noted, data are given for materials in their standard state (at 25 °C [77 °F], 100 kPa). Infobox references

Punicafolin is an ellagitannin from the leaves of Punica granatum (pomegranate) and in Phyllanthus emblica.

Punicafolin is an isomer of tellimagrandin II and nupharin A, but the hexahydroxydiphenoyl group is not attached to the same hydroxyl groups in the glucose molecule.

Punicafolin has been shown to have tumor suppressive effects in dogs.
