= Punigluconin =

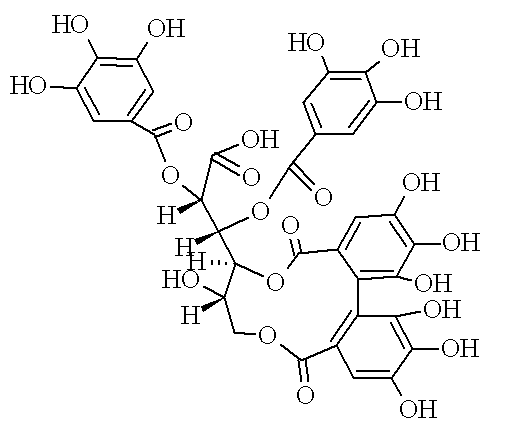
- Chemical structure of punigluconin

Names
- Systematic IUPAC name (2R,3S)-3-[(7R,8R)-1,2,3,8,13,14,15-Heptahydroxy-5,11-dioxo-5,8,9,11-tetrahydro-7H-dibenzo[g,i][1,5]dioxacycloundecin-7-yl]-2,3-bis[(3,4,5-trihydroxybenzoyl)oxy]propanoic acid
- Other names 2,5-di-O-galloyl-4,6-O-(S)-hexahydroxy-diphenoyl-D-gluconic acid

Identifiers
CAS Number	103488-38-6
3D model (JSmol)	Interactive image
ChemSpider	10272889
PubChem CID	44631480
UNII	9D6FCK37Q3
CompTox Dashboard (EPA)	DTXSID50616539
- InChI: InChI=1S/C34H26O23/c35-12-1-8(2-13(36)21(12)42)31(50)56-28(29(30(48)49)57-32(51)9-3-14(37)22(43)15(38)4-9)27-18(41)7-54-33(52)10-5-16(39)23(44)25(46)19(10)20-11(34(53)55-27)6-17(40)24(45)26(20)47/h1-6,18,27-29,35-47H,7H2,(H,48,49)/t18-,27-,28+,29-/m1/s1 Key: KZEYIYXACMUTRM-WIMKJKQSSA-N
- SMILES: Oc1cc(cc(O)c1O)C(=O)O[C@@H](C(O)=O)[C@@H](OC(=O)c2cc(O)c(O)c(O)c2)[C@@H]4OC(=O)c5cc(O)c(O)c(O)c5c3c(O)c(O)c(O)cc3C(=O)OC[C@H]4O

Properties
Chemical formula	C_{34}H_{26}O_{23}
Molar mass	802.53 g/mol
- Except where otherwise noted, data are given for materials in their standard state (at 25 °C [77 °F], 100 kPa). Infobox references

Punigluconin is an ellagitannin, a polyphenol compound. It is found in the bark of Punica granatum (pomegranate) and in Emblica officinalis. It is a molecule having a hexahydroxydiphenic acid group and two gallic acids attached to a gluconic acid core.
