= Granatin B =

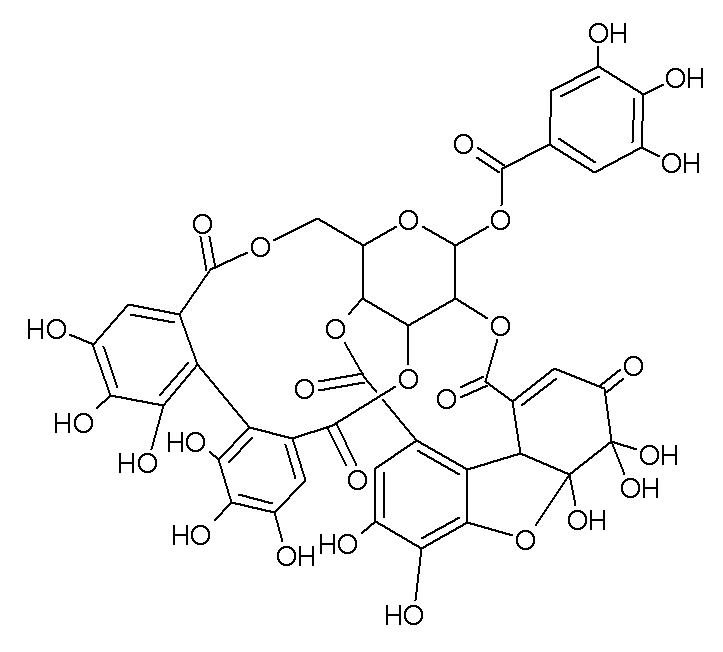
- Chemical structure of granatin B

Identifiers
CAS Number	77322-54-4
3D model (JSmol)	Interactive image
ChEBI	CHEBI:167697
ChemSpider	61507701
PubChem CID	50903199
CompTox Dashboard (EPA)	DTXSID001030262
- InChI: InChI=1S/C41H28O27/c42-13-1-8(2-14(43)24(13)48)34(54)67-39-33-32-30(64-37(57)11-5-17(46)27(51)31-22(11)23-12(38(58)66-33)6-19(47)40(59,60)41(23,61)68-31)18(63-39)7-62-35(55)9-3-15(44)25(49)28(52)20(9)21-10(36(56)65-32)4-16(45)26(50)29(21)53/h1-6,18,23,30,32-33,39,42-46,48-53,59-61H,7H2/t18-,23?,30-,32+,33-,39+,41?/m1/s1 Key: FFNTWLBZRJZJEJ-PYGBXMOSSA-N
- SMILES: C1[C@@H]2[C@@H]3[C@@H]([C@H]([C@@H](O2)OC(=O)C4=CC(=C(C(=C4)O)O)O)OC(=O)C5=CC(=O)C(C6(C5C7=C(O6)C(=C(C=C7C(=O)O3)O)O)O)(O)O)OC(=O)C8=CC(=C(C(=C8C9=C(C(=C(C=C9C(=O)O1)O)O)O)O)O)O

Properties
Chemical formula	C_{41}H_{28}O_{27}
Molar mass	952.648 g·mol^{−1}
- Except where otherwise noted, data are given for materials in their standard state (at 25 °C [77 °F], 100 kPa). Infobox references

Granatin B is an ellagitannin found in the fruit of Punica granatum (pomegranate). It is a molecule having an enantiomeric dehydrohexahydroxydiphenoyl group.

It is a highly active carbonic anhydrase inhibitor.
