= Nupharin A =

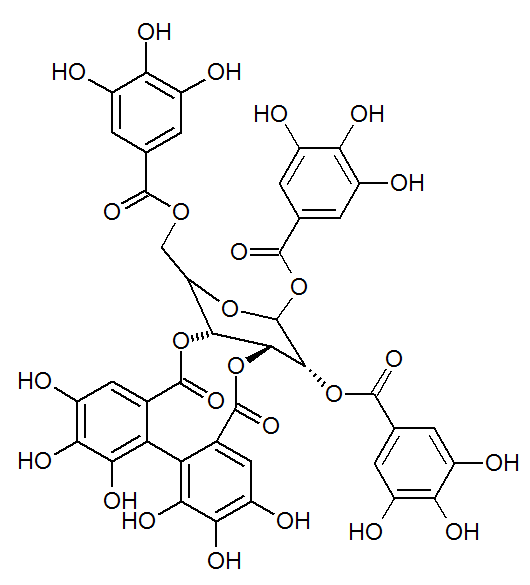

Identifiers
CAS Number	81956-07-2
3D model (JSmol)	Interactive image
ChemSpider	8709251
PubChem CID	10533860
CompTox Dashboard (EPA)	DTXSID401002336
- InChI: InChI=1S/C41H30O26/c42-15-1-10(2-16(43)26(15)50)36(57)62-9-23-33-34(65-40(61)14-8-22(49)30(54)32(56)25(14)24-13(39(60)64-33)7-21(48)29(53)31(24)55)35(66-37(58)11-3-17(44)27(51)18(45)4-11)41(63-23)67-38(59)12-5-19(46)28(52)20(47)6-12/h1-8,23,33-35,41-56H,9H2/t23-,33-,34+,35-,41+/m1/s1 Key: ZQYQKZCDCFVYLV-UUUCSUBKSA-N; InChI=1/C41H30O26/c42-15-1-10(2-16(43)26(15)50)36(57)62-9-23-33-34(65-40(61)14-8-22(49)30(54)32(56)25(14)24-13(39(60)64-33)7-21(48)29(53)31(24)55)35(66-37(58)11-3-17(44)27(51)18(45)4-11)41(63-23)67-38(59)12-5-19(46)28(52)20(47)6-12/h1-8,23,33-35,41-56H,9H2/t23-,33-,34+,35-,41+/m1/s1 Key: ZQYQKZCDCFVYLV-UUUCSUBKBO
- SMILES: O=C3O[C@H]7[C@H](OC(=O)c1c(c(O)c(O)c(O)c1)c2c(O)c(O)c(O)cc23)[C@@H](OC(=O)c4cc(O)c(O)c(O)c4)[C@H](OC(=O)c5cc(O)c(O)c(O)c5)O[C@@H]7COC(=O)c6cc(O)c(O)c(O)c6

Properties
Chemical formula	C_{41}H_{30}O_{26}
Molar mass	938.66 g/mol
- Except where otherwise noted, data are given for materials in their standard state (at 25 °C [77 °F], 100 kPa). Infobox references

Nupharin A is an ellagitannin found in Nuphar japonica. It is a molecule with three gallic acid units and one hexahydroxydiphenic acid unit attached to a glucose residue. It is an isomer of punicafolin and tellimagrandin II.
