= Pedunculagin =

- Chemical structure of pedunculagin

Identifiers
CAS Number	7045-42-3
3D model (JSmol)	Interactive image
ChEBI	CHEBI:7948
ChEMBL	ChEMBL506204
ChemSpider	391045
KEGG	C10236
PubChem CID	442688
UNII	1KN18B7Y0X
CompTox Dashboard (EPA)	DTXSID20990656
- InChI: InChI=1S/C34H24O22/c35-10-1-6-15(23(43)19(10)39)16-7(2-11(36)20(40)24(16)44)31(48)54-27-14(5-52-30(6)47)53-34(51)29-28(27)55-32(49)8-3-12(37)21(41)25(45)17(8)18-9(33(50)56-29)4-13(38)22(42)26(18)46/h1-4,14,27-29,34-46,51H,5H2/t14-,27-,28+,29-,34?/m1/s1 Key: IYMHVUYNBVWXKH-ZITZVVOASA-N; InChI=1/C34H24O22/c35-10-1-6-15(23(43)19(10)39)16-7(2-11(36)20(40)24(16)44)31(48)54-27-14(5-52-30(6)47)53-34(51)29-28(27)55-32(49)8-3-12(37)21(41)25(45)17(8)18-9(33(50)56-29)4-13(38)22(42)26(18)46/h1-4,14,27-29,34-46,51H,5H2/t14-,27-,28+,29-,34?/m1/s1 Key: IYMHVUYNBVWXKH-ZITZVVOABK
- SMILES: c1c2c(c(c(c1O)O)O)-c3c(cc(c(c3O)O)O)C(=O)O[C@@H]4[C@@H](COC2=O)OC([C@H]5[C@H]4OC(=O)c6cc(c(c(c6-c7c(cc(c(c7O)O)O)C(=O)O5)O)O)O)O

Properties
Chemical formula	C_{34}H_{24}O_{22}
Molar mass	784.544 g·mol^{−1}
- Except where otherwise noted, data are given for materials in their standard state (at 25 °C [77 °F], 100 kPa). Infobox references

Pedunculagin is an ellagitannin. It is formed from casuarictin via the loss of a gallate group.

== Natural occurrence ==
Pedunculagin is found in plants in orders in the clade Rosidae. It can be found the pericarp of pomegranates (Punica granatum), in the family Lythraceae, in the order Myrtales. It is also found in plants in the order Fagales such as walnuts (Juglans regia) in the family Juglandaceae, in Alnus sieboldiana and in the Manchurian alder (Alnus hirsuta var. microphylla), both species in the family Betulaceae and it is one of the main oak wood ellagitannins along with castalagin, vescalagin, grandinin and roburins A-E (genus Quercus, in the family Fagaceae). It is also found in the Indian gooseberry (Phyllanthus emblica), a plant in the family Phyllanthaceae, in the order Malpighiales.

Galloyl pedunculagin can be found in Platycarya strobilacea.

== Research ==
Pedunculagin is a highly active carbonic anhydrase inhibitor in vitro.

== Chemistry ==
A total synthesis of pedunculagin has been reported.

Pedunculagin is an isomer of terflavin B.
