= Tellimagrandin II =

- Chemical structure of tellimagrandin II

Names
- Systematic IUPAC name (11aR,13S,14R,15S,15aR)-2,3,4,5,6,7-Hexahydroxy-9,17-dioxo-9,11,11a,13,14,15,15a,17-octahydrodibenzo[g,i]pyrano[3,2-b][1,5]dioxacycloundecine-13,14,15-triyl tris(2,3,4-trihydroxybenzoate)
- Other names Tellimagrandin II; Eugeniin

Identifiers
CAS Number	58970-75-5
3D model (JSmol)	Interactive image
ChEBI	CHEBI:4916
ChEMBL	ChEMBL450745
ChemSpider	391036
KEGG	C10224
PubChem CID	442679
- InChI: InChI=1S/C41H30O26/c42-15-1-10(2-16(43)26(15)50)36(57)65-34-33-23(9-62-39(60)13-7-21(48)29(53)31(55)24(13)25-14(40(61)64-33)8-22(49)30(54)32(25)56)63-41(67-38(59)12-5-19(46)28(52)20(47)6-12)35(34)66-37(58)11-3-17(44)27(51)18(45)4-11/h1-8,23,33-35,41-56H,9H2/t23-,33-,34+,35-,41+/m1/s1 Key: JCGHAEBIBSEQAD-UUUCSUBKSA-N
- SMILES: O=C(O[C@@H]1O[C@@H]2COC(=O)c3cc(O)c(O)c(O)c3-c3c(cc(O)c(O)c3O)C(=O)O[C@H]2[C@H](OC(=O)c2cc(O)c(O)c(O)c2)[C@H]1OC(=O)c1cc(O)c(O)c(O)c1)c1cc(O)c(O)c(O)c1

Properties
Chemical formula	C_{41}H_{30}O_{26}
Molar mass	938.66 g/mol
- Except where otherwise noted, data are given for materials in their standard state (at 25 °C [77 °F], 100 kPa). Infobox references

Tellimagrandin II is the first of the ellagitannins formed from 1,2,3,4,6-pentagalloyl-glucose. It can be found in Geum japonicum and Syzygium aromaticum (clove).

Tellimagrandin II is an isomer of punicafolin or nupharin A, but the hexahydroxydiphenoyl group is not attached to the same hydroxyl groups in the glucose molecule.

The compound shows anti-herpesvirus properties.

== Biosynthesis and metabolism ==
Tellimagrandin II is formed by oxidation of pentagalloyl glucose in Tellima grandiflora by the enzyme pentagalloylglucose: O(2) oxidoreductase, a laccase-type phenol oxidase.

pentagalloylglucose
tellimagrandin II

It is further oxidized to casuarictin, a molecule formed via oxidative dehydrogenation of 2 other galloyl groups in Casuarina and Stachyurus species.

tellimagrandin II
casuarictin

=== Dimerization ===
It is laccase-catalyzed dimerized to cornusiin E in Tellima grandiflora.

=== Uses ===
It has an extremely weak basic (essentially neutral) compound. The compound shows anti-herpesvirus properties.
