= Carbonic anhydrase inhibitor =

Class of pharmaceuticals

- Drug class
- Acetazolamide

Class identifiers
- Use: Glaucoma
- ATC code: S01EC
- Biological target: Carbonic anhydrase

Clinical data
- Drugs.com: Drug Classes

External links
- MeSH: D002257

Legal status

Carbonic anhydrase inhibitors are a class of pharmaceuticals that suppress the activity of carbonic anhydrase. Their clinical use has been established as anti-glaucoma agents, diuretics, antiepileptics, in the management of mountain sickness, gastric and duodenal ulcers, idiopathic intracranial hypertension, neurological disorders, or osteoporosis.

Members of carbonic anhydrase inhibitor group of medications include: acetazolamide, sulthiame, zonisamide, topiramate, dorzolamide, methazolamide, brinzolamide, dichlorphenamide.

== Medical uses ==
Carbonic anhydrase inhibitors are primarily used for the treatment of glaucoma. They may also be used to treat seizure disorder and acute mountain sickness. Because they encourage solubilization and excretion of uric acid, they can be used in the treatment of gout.

=== Glaucoma ===
Inhibition of carbonic anhydrase II in the ciliary processes of the eye decreases aqueous humor secretion, presumably by slowing the formation of bicarbonate ions with subsequent reduction in sodium and fluid transport.

=== Diuretic ===
Carbonic anhydrase inhibitors act as weak diuretics and saluretics (promotors of sodium chloride excretion). Acting principally upon the proximal tubule of the nephron, CAIs incompletely inhibit bicarbonate reabsorption by reducing conversion of carbonic acid to CO_{2} at the liminal membrane, reducing intracellular conversion of CO_{2} back to carbonic acid after CO_{2} has diffused across the membrane from the lumen, and reducing transport of Na^{+} and bicarbonate out of the cell across the basal membrane. Lowered bicarbonate reabsorption results in decreased activity of the apical Na^{+}/H^{+} exchanger which mediates diuresis. The reduced NaCl reabsorption in the proximal tubule is however partially compensated by increased NaCl reabsorption in more distal portions of the nephron (namely the thick ascending limb of loop of Henle). The diuretic effect of CAIs is therefore middling, and the principal effect is rather urinary loss of bicarbonate and consequent decrease of blood pH (promotion of metabolic acidosis).

=== Inhibition of cerebrospinal fluid production ===
Carbonic anhydrase inhibitors may be used to reduce the production of cerebrospinal fluid (CSF) in the brain. For instance, a cerebrospinal fluid leak may initially be treated medically with this medication to reduce the volume of leakage, and promote healing of the fistula. Similarly, in Idiopathic intracranial hypertension, reduction of CSF production by the choroid plexi may reduce intracranial pressures and reduce symptoms of elevated intracranial pressure such as retroorbital headaches and loss of vision. The mechanism is thought to involve inhibition of carbonic anhydrase (CA) within the choroidal epithelial cells, reducing the production of protons which are necessary for the osmotic transport of water and ions which constitute CSF.

=== Epilepsy ===
Acetazolamide is effective in the treatment of most types of seizures, including generalized tonic-clonic and focal seizures and especially absence seizures, although it has limited utility because tolerance develops with chronic use. The drug is occasionally used on an intermittent basis to prevent seizures in catamenial epilepsy.

The sulfur-containing antiseizure and antimigraine drug topiramate is a weak inhibitor of carbonic anhydrase, particularly subtypes II and IV. Whether carbonic anhydrase inhibition contributes to its clinical activity is not known. In rare cases, the inhibition of carbonic anhydrase may be strong enough to cause metabolic acidosis of clinical importance. Zonisamide is another sulfur containing antiseizure drug that weakly inhibits carbonic anhydrase.

Sultiame is also an example of an anticonvulsant drug of this class.

=== Altitude sickness ===
At high altitude, the partial pressure of oxygen is lower and people have to breathe more rapidly to get adequate oxygen. When this happens, the partial pressure of CO_{2} in the lungs (pCO_{2}) decreases (is "blown off"), causing a respiratory alkalosis. This would normally be compensated by the kidney excreting bicarbonate and causing compensatory metabolic acidosis, but this homeostatic adaptation takes several days to develop. Carbonic anhydrase inhibitors can therefore be used to hasten (or, rather, mimic) acclimatization as these inhibit renal bicarbonate reabsorption, thus counteracting the altitude-related respiratory alkalosis. Carbonic anhydrase inhibitors have also been shown to improve chronic mountain sickness.

== Contraindications ==
- Hepatic cirrhosis

== Adverse effects ==
Loss of bicarbonate may result in metabolic acidosis.

== In plants ==
Ellagitannins extracted from the pericarps of Punica granatum, the pomegranate, such as punicalin, punicalagin, granatin B, gallagyldilactone, casuarinin, pedunculagin and tellimagrandin I, are carbonic anhydrase inhibitors.
