= Minttu =

Finnish peppermint distilled beverage

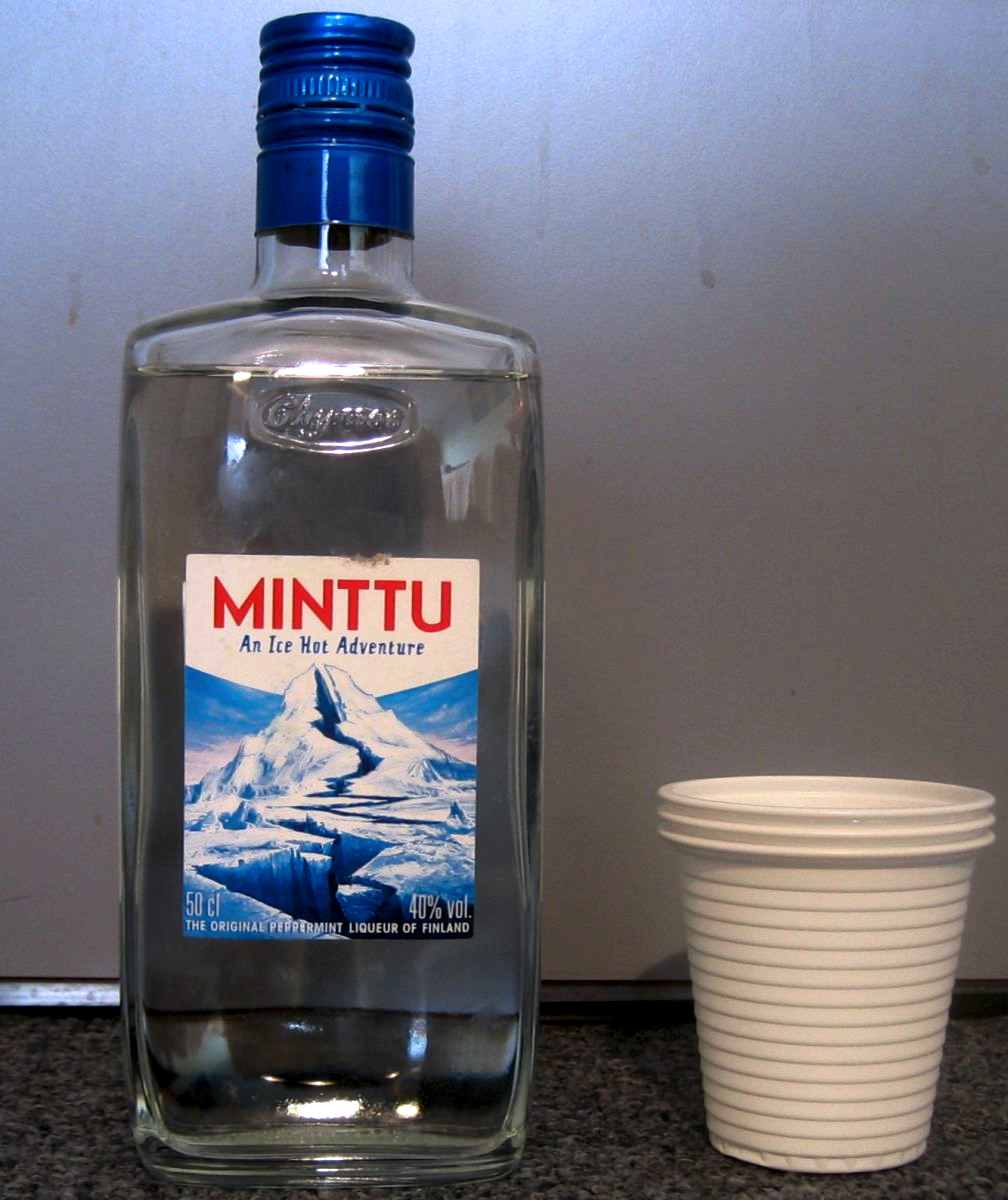
Minttu peppermint liqueur.

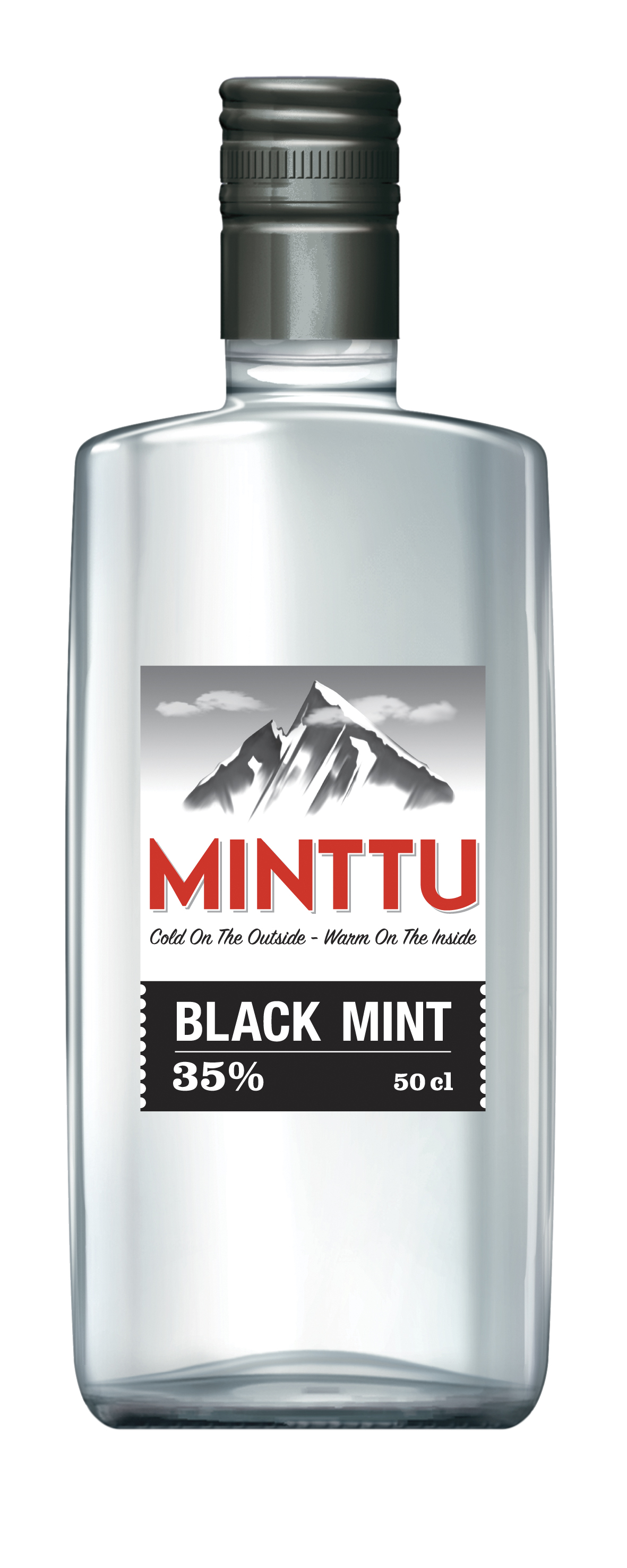
Minttu Black Mint salmiakki liqueur.

Minttu (Finnish for "mint") is a Finnish brand of peppermint-flavoured liqueur produced by Hartwall. A characteristic ingredient of the liqueur is peppermint, to give a fresh taste and aroma.

== History ==
Minttu was originally developed by Chymos based on an idea from Finnish national alcohol retailer Alko. Alko had obtained a sample batch of American peppermint liqueur at a trade fair in Italy in 1986. The American developers had had an idea for a new, unique and exotic product, and wished to develop it in the Nordic countries, which were seen by them as a cold, far-away place. The Americans wanted the beverage to be clear in colour and have the word "schnapps" in its name. The alcohol content of the beverage had to be 100 proof, meaning 50 percent. Thus the new product would stand out among the peppermint liqueurs on the market. Alko was not interested, but it offered the production company Chymos the possibility to develop a beverage suited to the Finnish taste, while also meeting the American objectives.

== American market ==
The new product was developed quickly and presented to the American developers, who accepted it. The engineers at Chymos wanted a round bottle, which would have been efficient to produce, but the marketing department aimed at something more special: Minttu was packaged in a rectangular bottle called a "piece of plank". The surface of the bottle was designed with a connotation of ice, to give an image of the cold Nordic countries. The label was designed by Chymos's graphic artist Aimo Vuorinen.

The first setback came when the first shipload of Minttu arrived in the United States. Part of the cargo was clear as intended, but the remainder had been coloured yellow during manufacture. Chymos received crushing negative feedback, and cooperation with the American developers ended. The Americans sold off the yellow-coloured batch, at a higher price, untruthfully claiming that the yellow liqueur was of an "older vintage" and thus more expensive.

The reason for the yellow colour was revealed by laboratory experiments to have been the use of iron-rich water from Lappeenranta. The problem was solved when Chymos started using distilled water.

== European market ==
Minttu next targeted tax-free areas in Europe in both Germany and Austria, especially in the area around the Alps. Marketing of the beverage especially targeted skiing centres. The sales were helped by the strong alcohol content and the fact that the alcohol was not noticeable due to the peppermint taste. There was a jocular saying that drinking Minttu refreshed one's breath and made one's behaviour polite.

== Finnish market ==
Minttu entered the Finnish market in the early 1990s, and its reputation elsewhere in Europe helped boost its sales from the start. This caused problems in production, as the bottling capacity for the "piece of plank" was limited. At the most intense phase, bottling Minttu required work in two, and sometimes even three, shifts per day. It was also suggested that the rectangular bottle be replaced with a round one as originally desired by the development engineers, but the marketing department did not agree.

In 1993 salty liquorice liqueur Salmiakki Koskenkorva became a competitor for Minttu, but not a major one, as the consumer targets were different. Press stories appeared about problems with young drinkers and heart disease patients because of the common effect of alcohol and the ammonium chloride in salty liquorice. Salmiakki Koskenkorva was briefly withdrawn from the market. There was also pressure on Minttu sales for the same reasons. Alko decided to continue selling Minttu, but lowered its alcohol content from 50 to 40 percent. At the same time, the word "schnapps" on the label was replaced with "liqueur". This caused sales of Minttu to drop and the beverage came into the category of "normal alcoholic drinks". Later sales of Minttu concentrated on skiing centres also in Finland.

== Later phases ==
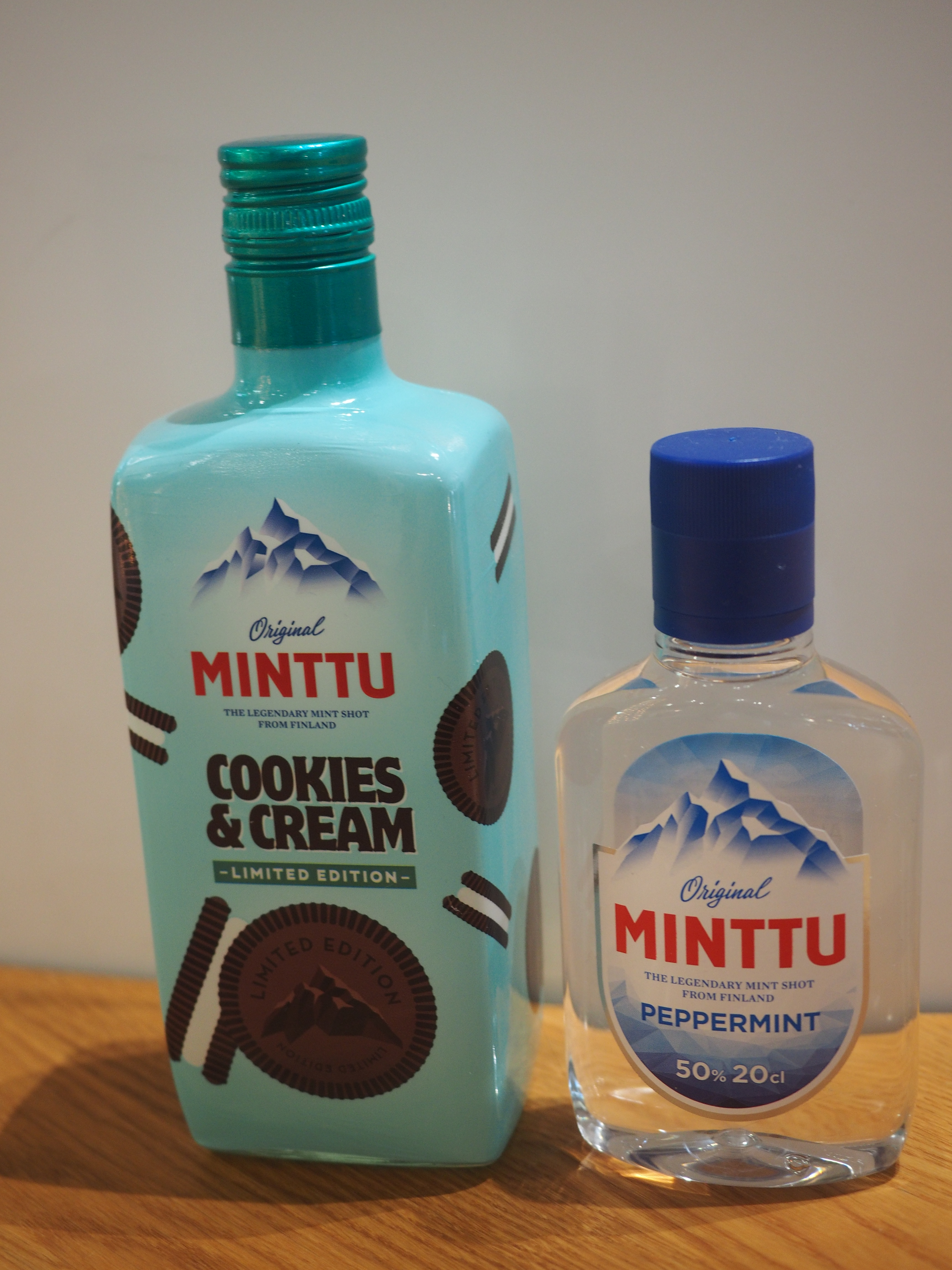
Limited-edition Minttu Cookies and Cream with a schnapps-sized bottle of Minttu original peppermint liqueur.

In 2009, production of Minttu moved to Pernod Ricard, which has since been developing the product family. The packaging has also been renewed by replacing the frosted ice design of the bottle with a smooth bottle.

The Minttu core product line now includes six different versions: Minttu Peppermint, Minttu Choco, Minttu Black with a salty liquorice flavour, Minttu Peach, Minttu Cool Mint Choco with a chocolate milk flavour and the limited edition Minttu Cookies & Cream. The Minttu Twist product line includes five versions with less alcohol and more flavour: Minttu Twist Bubble Gum, Minttu Twist Polka, Minttu Twist Karamel with a caramel flavour, Minttu Twist Cinnamon Bun and Minttu Twist Cool Banana.

Minttu has established its position both in the Nordic countries and in the Baltic countries. In Finland, Minttu Peppermint has been one of Alko's best selling products for as long as Alko has been keeping records. In 2013 the beverage was at position 13 in the category "other strong drinks".

In 2024, the Finnish beverage company Hartwall said it will buy its Finnish brands and their production, which also included Minttu liqueur, from the alcohol company Pernod Ricard.
