= Oldflån-Ansätten Nature Reserve =

Nature reserve in Jämtland, Sweden

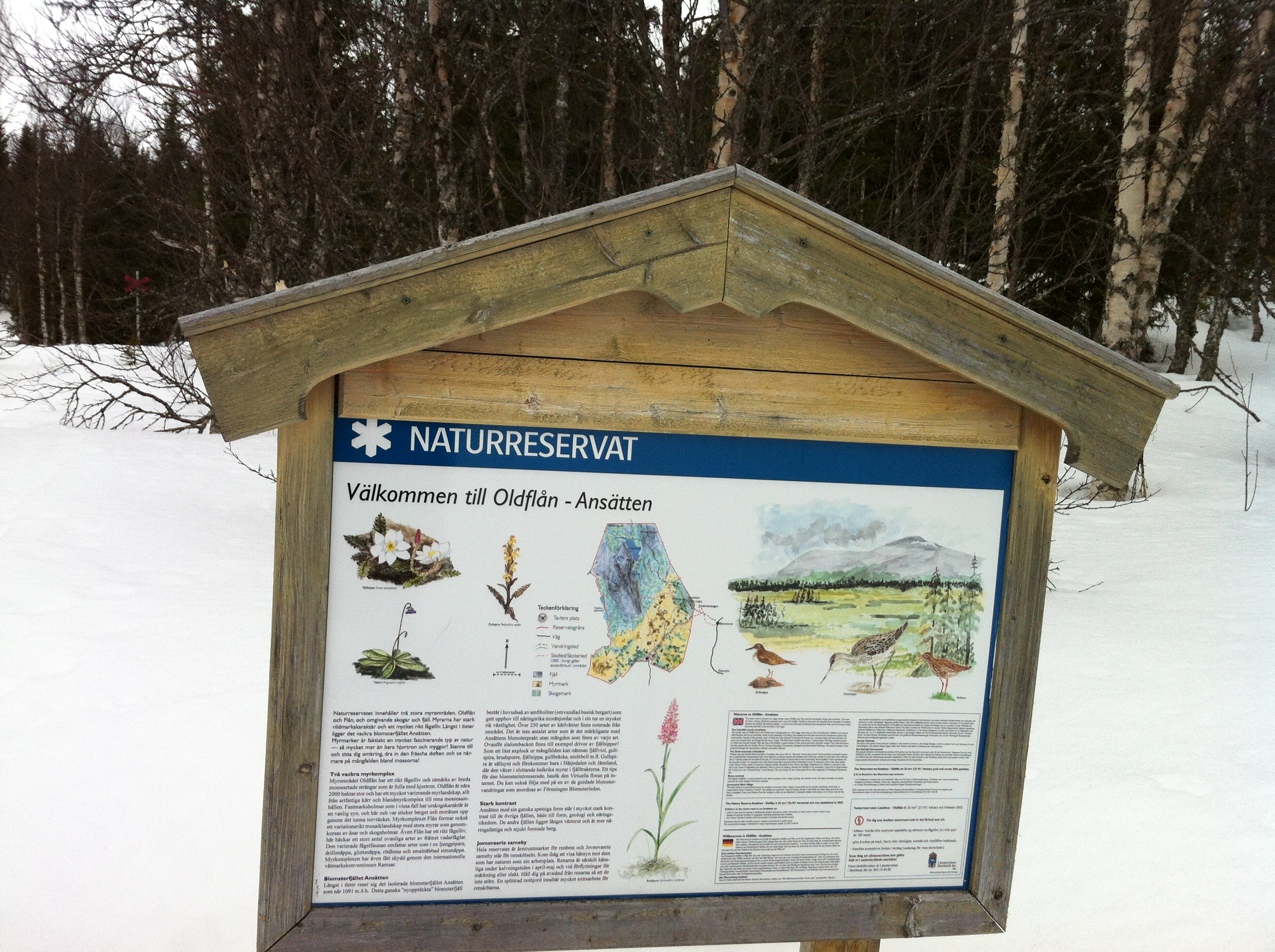
- Entrance to the nature reserve

- Location within Jämtland Location within Sweden
- Location: Sweden
- Nearest city: Östersund
- Coordinates: 63°51′36″N 13°48′36″E
- Area: 260 km^{2} (64,000 acres)
- Established: 2002

Oldflån-Ansätten Nature Reserve (Swedish: Oldflån-Ansättens naturreservat) is a nature reserve in Jämtland County in Sweden.

The nature reserve includes the mountain peak Ansätten as well as areas of wetland. The wetland area is diverse in its composition and provides a habitat for several species of birds; it is part of the EU-wide Natura 2000-network and is a designated Ramsar site. The flora of the area is also rich and includes several species of orchids, cloudberry and Pedicularis oederi; the nature reserve is one of only a few known locales for the latter.

The nature reserve is grazed by reindeer belonging to the local Sami population.
