= Marianne (candy) =

Finnish candy brand

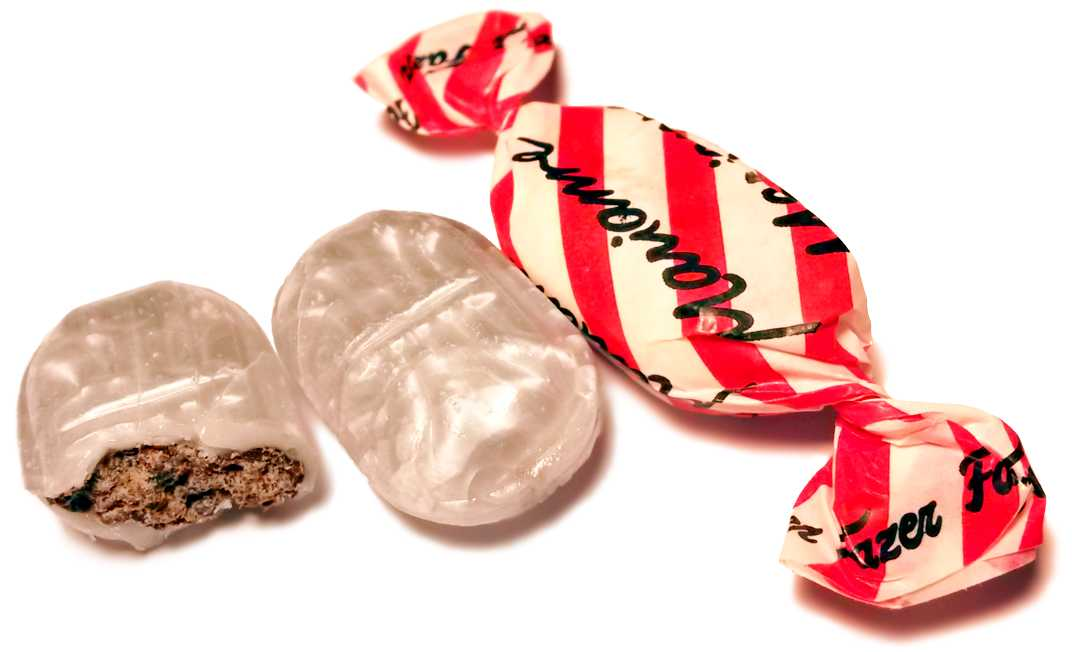
A Marianne candy with a crumbling chocolate filling. The candy has a hard silver-coloured peppermint-flavoured shell.

Marianne is a Finnish mint chocolate candy originally developed in 1949 by Chymos, now produced by Fazer. Marianne candies have a hard peppermint-flavoured shell and a chocolate filling.

Fazer bought Chymos in 1993 and Marianne moved to Fazer's product line.

== History ==
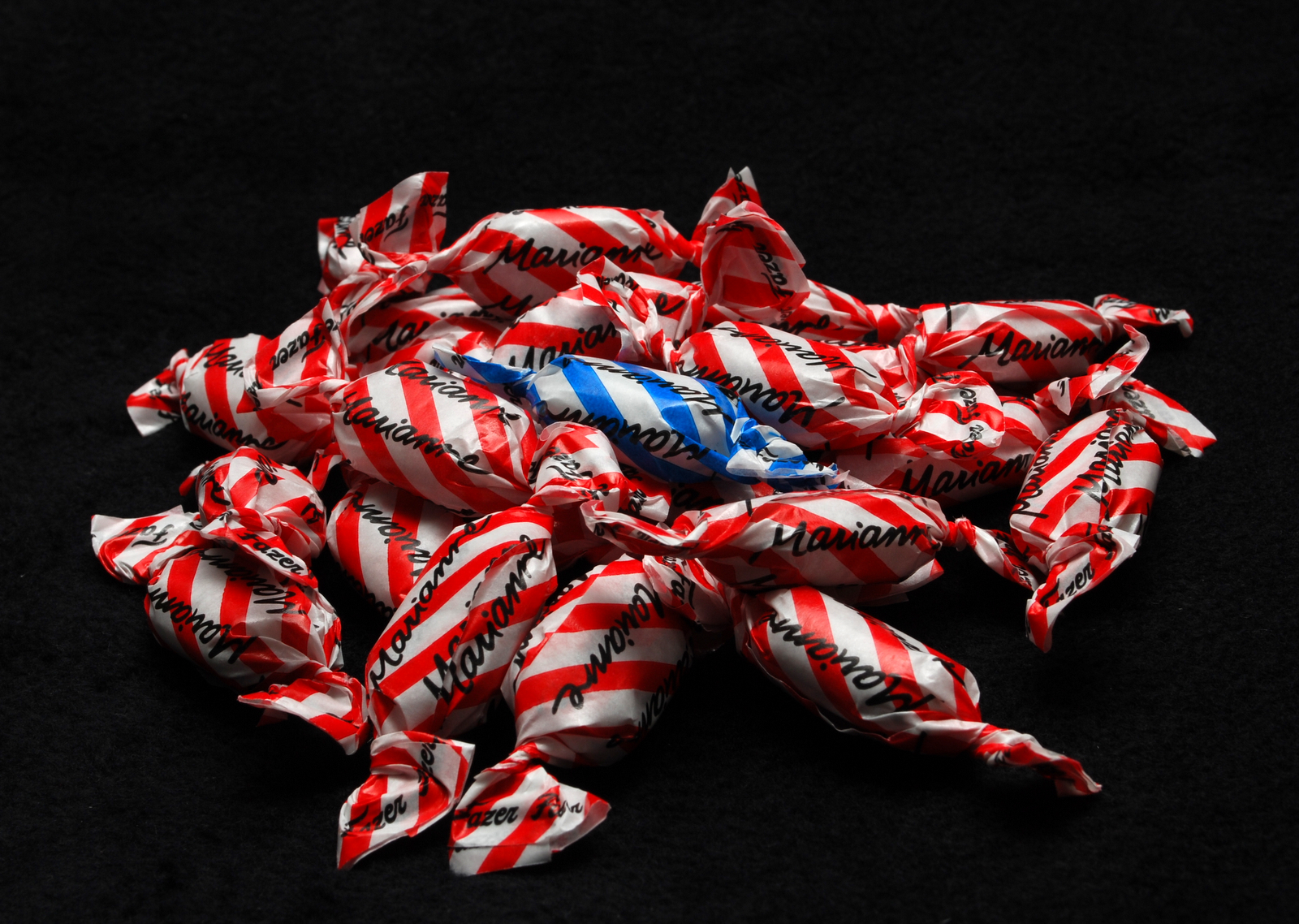
Pile of Marianne candies

Production of Marianne started in 1949 at the Chymos factory in Toijala under instruction of master candymaker Aimo Martikainen. After the war, the Finnish people's appetite for candy was immense, and for some reason, Finns took a liking to a combination of chocolate and peppermint. In 1956, Chymos's new CEO Jouko Keränen had noticed the possibilities of the candy, but he thought the simple paper wrapper was too modest and common. He gave Aimo Vuorinen, the graphics artist at Chymos, the difficult task of "adding more glamour".

Up to the 1930s, candy products in Finland were named along the lines of "Fazer mint chocolate" or "Chymos filled candies". These descriptions were written on top of the candy packaging. In the 1950s after the war supermarkets became common in Finland, where customers picked their items from the shelf themselves and paid for them at the cashier's desk. This made the products need to sell themselves directly from the shelf. A brand image was needed for the products. The packaging had a great effect in this. The diagonal red-white stripes describing the flavour of peppermint was an old European tradition. Even before the candy got its name Marianne, the stripes were present in the packaging and the candies were imprinted with the image of a sheaf. The product was just simply named "Chymos peppermint chocolate".

Vuorinen thought that peppermint and chocolate were associated with France (similarly to Fazer's "French pastilles"). He sought some kind of French symbol other than the tricolour. He thought of the French national personification Marianne. He made sketches with the name Marianne and the image of the personification as a young maiden. However, this resulted in negative feedback. Chymos returned to the original red-white striped wrapper, imprinted with the name Marianne. It became Finland's best selling candy for years.

== Product development ==
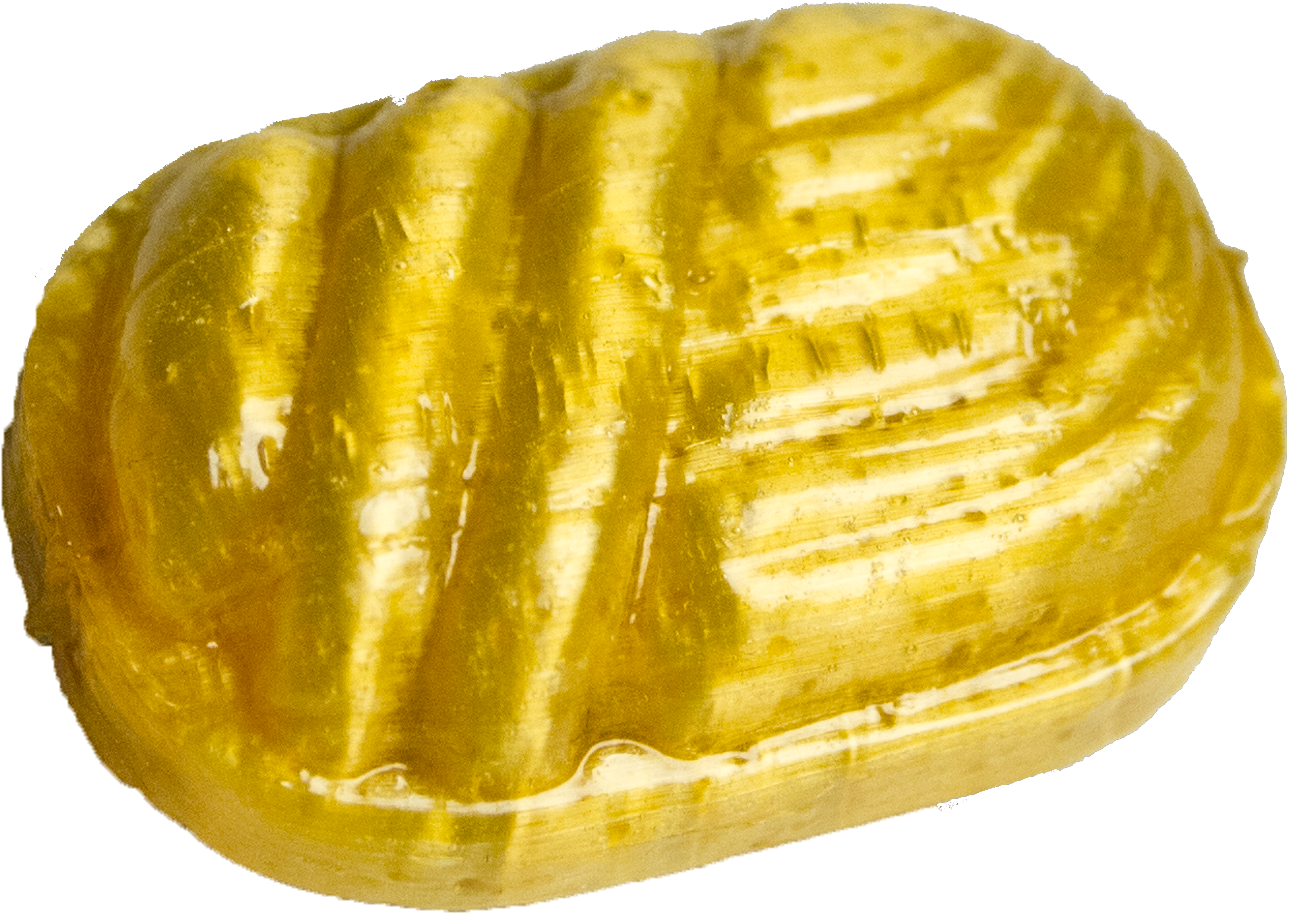
Orange-flavoured Marianne.

The Marianne product family was joined in the 1970s by the toffee-filled Marimint (now known as Marianne Toffee) and the orange-flavoured AnneMari, which was later renamed Marianne Appelsiini. Nowadays it has become only one flavour variation in the mixed bag Marianne Mix, which is produced for Christmas season and travel retail.

Fazer bought Chymos in 1993 and Marianne became part of its product line. Marianne was one of the products Fazer especially wanted, because it had established itself well both in Finland and elsewhere in Europe. According to Fazer, Marianne is a combination of "the Russian candy tradition and the French taste". The annual production of the original Marianne candy in Lappeenranta in 1.4 million kilograms.

== Marianne products ==
In 2000, Marianne Light sweetened with xylitol instead of sugar and Marianne drops were introduced. Marianne drops came in three different packagings: a small box, a bag of 150 grams and a box of 200 grams for travel retail. A bakery product called Marianne Crush was introduced in 2003.

In 2006, the Marianne Snacks chocolate bar and loose candy were introduced, followed by a Marianne liquorice bar in 2009. A Marianne Mix box containing Marianne candies with traditional, toffee-filled and orange-flavoured Marianne candies is available at Christmas time and for travel retail.

Fazer has expanded the Marianne product line to new products. Fazer's Kismet chocolate bars are available with Marianne filling. In autumn 2013, coffee-flavoured Marianne Café candies and Marianne biscuits were introduced. The Fazer product line also includes Marianne cake rolls and Marianne muffins. Nestlé also produces Marianne ice cream.

The Marianne park was opened in Lappeenranta near the Chymos factory in 2013. It is maintained by the city of Lappeenranta and Fazer.
