= Bakeapple pie =

Canadian dessert

Bakeapple pie is a Canadian dessert originating in Newfoundland made from cloudberries (Rubus chamaemorus).

== History ==
The use of cloudberries, known as bakeapples in Eastern Canada, was first prevalent in Norway as a way to combat scurvy, earliest documented by Henrik Høyer, a Norwegian doctor, in 1596. First Nations peoples across the circumpolar North have utilized the berry for centuries, known as "aqpik" in the Inuit language. Settlers consumed cloudberries in Newfoundland, where the berry was named 'bakeapple', however the origin of how this name came to be is debated.

== Ingredients ==
A traditional Newfoundland and Labrador style bakeapple pie usually contains bakeapples, sugar, and a pastry crust. Some variations are in cheesecake form, using bakeapple as a topping. The filling for the pie is also commonly used as a jam spread.
