= Chymos =

Finnish food company

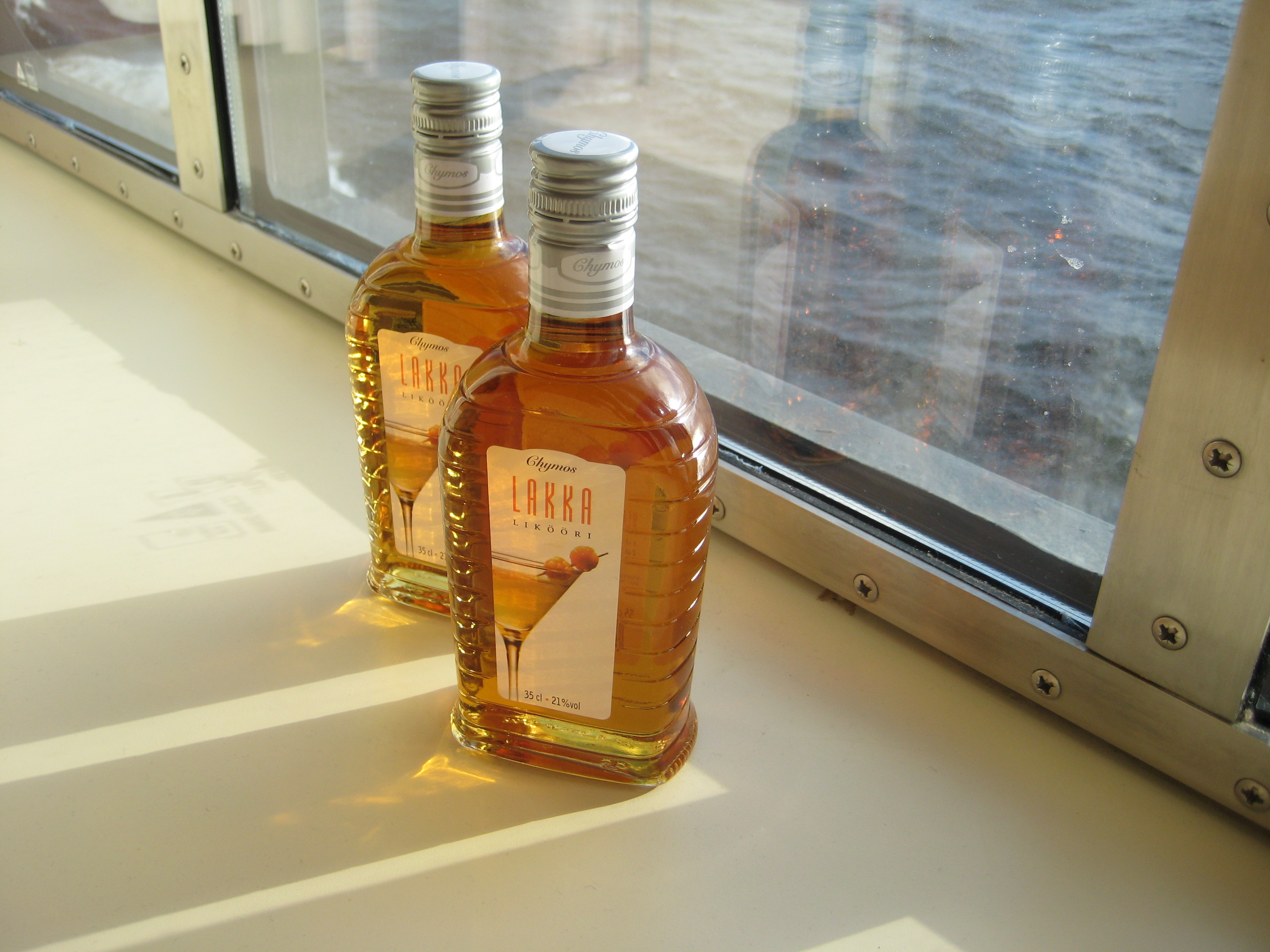
Two bottles of Lakka liqueur produced by Chymos

Chymos Oy was a Finnish company founded in 1906, producing juice, jam, wine, liqueurs and candy. In 1993 the company's candy production was bought out by Fazer, and in 2006 Chymos was fully assimilated into Cloetta Fazer.

The name Chymos comes from the Greek language word khymos (χυμός), meaning juice. According to the company's publication the name is properly pronounced starting with "k", but the public pronounced it with "h", "s" or "ts".

== History ==
=== Foundation and early years ===
The mountain councillor Wäinö Tammenoksa founded Alkoholittomien Juomien Tehdas Chymos ("Chymos Factory of Non-alcoholic Beverages") in Tainionkoski in Ruokolahti municipality (nowadays part of Imatra) in 1906. This was the first time Finnish forest berries were refined industrially.

The name was changed to Tehdas Chymos in 1918. In 1922 the company moved to Lappeenranta.

=== Jukka Tammenoksa's time as CEO ===
Wäinö Tammenoksa's son Jukka Tammenoksa was appointed CEO of Chymos in 1929, when he was only 23 years old. His time as CEO, which ended in 1952, saw very little time considered normal. First came prohibition, then the Great Depression of the 1930s, the Winter War and the Continuation War, and finally the post-war time of famine with ration stamps for food products.

There was great doubt towards industrially produced juice, and Finns made their juice at home. The market for industrially produced juice slowly improved. After prohibition was repealed, the product line also included wine and liqueurs. It had already included non-alcoholic liqueurs. The product line also included jelly, jam and marmalade. The entire 1930s was a time of steady development. The product line also included candy, of which the best known are Marianne, Omar, Pantteri and London drops.

For sales outside Finland, the Chymos Company of America was founded in the United States in 1934. In 1937 Chymos Tehdas became the Chymos Oy limited company, whose shares were owned entirely by the Tammenoksa family. In 1936 the factory employed about 150 people.

Even during war time, the company underwent positive development despite the tight control of the food industry. The factory and its production was expanded, and it also sold products to the Finnish Defence Forces. In war time part of the production was moved to Toijala further away from the frontline.

Despite its great success, the company went into rapid decline in the 1950s. This was caused by reduction of demand for conserved food and increase of personnel size and expenses. The company had invested in a macaroni factory, which proved to operate at a loss. The company's economy was further negatively affected by working at two places simultaneously. The Toijala factory was discontinued in 1952, and production returned to Lappeenranta. At the same time Jukka Tammenoksa resigned as CEO.

=== Financial difficulties and end of Tammenoksa ownership ===
Jukka Tammenoksa's brother Olavi Tammenoksa succeeded him as CEO for a year. This was a last attempt to keep the company under the ownership of the Tammenoksa family. Ultimately the financial difficulties were so severe that the bank financing the company moved the Tammenoksa family aside in 1953 and appointed a new CEO from outside the family.

The Tammenoksa family sold their shares of Chymos Oy to Regulus Oy in the middle 1950s. It was a holding company founded when the medicine production of the Orion Corporation was separated from the rest of the corporation's activities.

=== As part of the Orion Corporation ===
The Orion Corporation had been founded in 1917. During the years, it had acquired numerous business branches which were not part of the medicine business. In the middle 1950s the corporation was split into two parts: a new medicine factory keeping the Orion name was founded. The "old Orion" took the name Regulus Oy. Its daughter companies were Oriola Oy and Noiro Oy. Regulus also founded other daughter companies, rescued companies in difficulties and sought to revive their activities. The most prominent acquisition in this principle was Chymos.

Chymos had a good name, up-to-date machinery, strong knowledge about the food industry and professional staff. The reasons for the difficulties were bad economic circumstances caused by the post-war famine years and erroneous solutions. In 1955 the new CEO of Chymos was Jouko Keränen from the Huhtamäki corporation. In 1959 he joined Orion as its CEO instead.

Keränen's successor as CEO was diploma engineer Yrjö Ylijoki, who had joined Chymos as an operational engineer in 1945. From 1951 to 1952 he served as supervisor of the company's Toijala factories. The Toijala factories were discontinued in 1952, and production returned to Lappeenranta. Ylijoki followed along and served as the technical supervisor of the Lappeenranta factory. In 1959 he was appointed CEO of Chymos as the successor of Keränen, who had moved to Orion.

Under Ylijoki's leadership the factory expanded and became a prestigious factory in its field. According to the 1957 report, Chymos produced thirty different kinds of juice and marmalade, almost a hundred kinds of candy and macaroni. Production of macaroni was done in the Regulus factories in Keuruu.

A major breakthrough happened in the early 1960s as sales increased, which caused the factory to enter production difficulties, even though its machines were working at peak efficiency and the staff worked three shifts. The factory had to be expanded, which happened in 1962. In the early 1970s Chymos was exporting its products to over thirty countries worldwide. There were over four hundred employees, and the company was the third largest private employer in Lappeenranta.

The next expansion phase happened in the middle 1960s. The new premises were mostly for candy production and storage. Organisational changes and ownership solutions were accepted in 1969, which caused Regulus Oy, Orion Oy, Chymos Oy and Noiro Oy to cease being separate companies and form a joint company Orion-yhtymä Oy.

The last landmarks of the Tammenoksa era disappeared in 1972, when the old main building was dismantled and the offices were temporarily relocated into an old riding hall acquired recently. For future use the company acquired land from elsewhere, with Chymos eventually owning 27 hectares of industrial space in Lappeenranta. In the early 1970s Chymos employed 650 people.

Yrjö Ylijoki retired in 1975.

=== End of independent activity ===
In 1993 the candy production of the company was acquired by Fazer. In 2006 Chymos was fully assimilated into Cloetta Fazer and ceased being an independent company.

== Company products ==
Chymos started producing candy in 1934. The company's best-known product is Marianne, a peppermint chocolate candy wrapped in a red-white striped paper. It has been produced since 1949. Other famous candies include Julia, Pantteri, London drops, Omar, Ässä Mix and Pirate coins.

Chymos has also produced baby food, juices, and marmalade. The company has also produced alcoholic drinks such as Polar, Minttu and Lakka liqueurs as well as Kavaljeeri sparkling wine. Production of Lakka later moved to V & S Finland. In 2008 its parent company, the Swedish V&S Group was sold to Pernod Ricard. Nowadays Chymos alcoholic drinks are marketed by Pernod Ricard Finland Oy.

== Sources ==
- Kauria, Leena (ed.): Meidän tehdas Chymos, Chymoksen historiikki, Chymoksen perinneyhdistys ry 2014. ISBN 978-9-5293-4517-5.
- Vuorinen, Aimo: Mestareita ja Tekijöitä. Lappeenranta: Chymos, 1980. ISBN 951-99287-6-6.
