= Cloudberry liqueur =

Finnish distilled liquor

Lakka
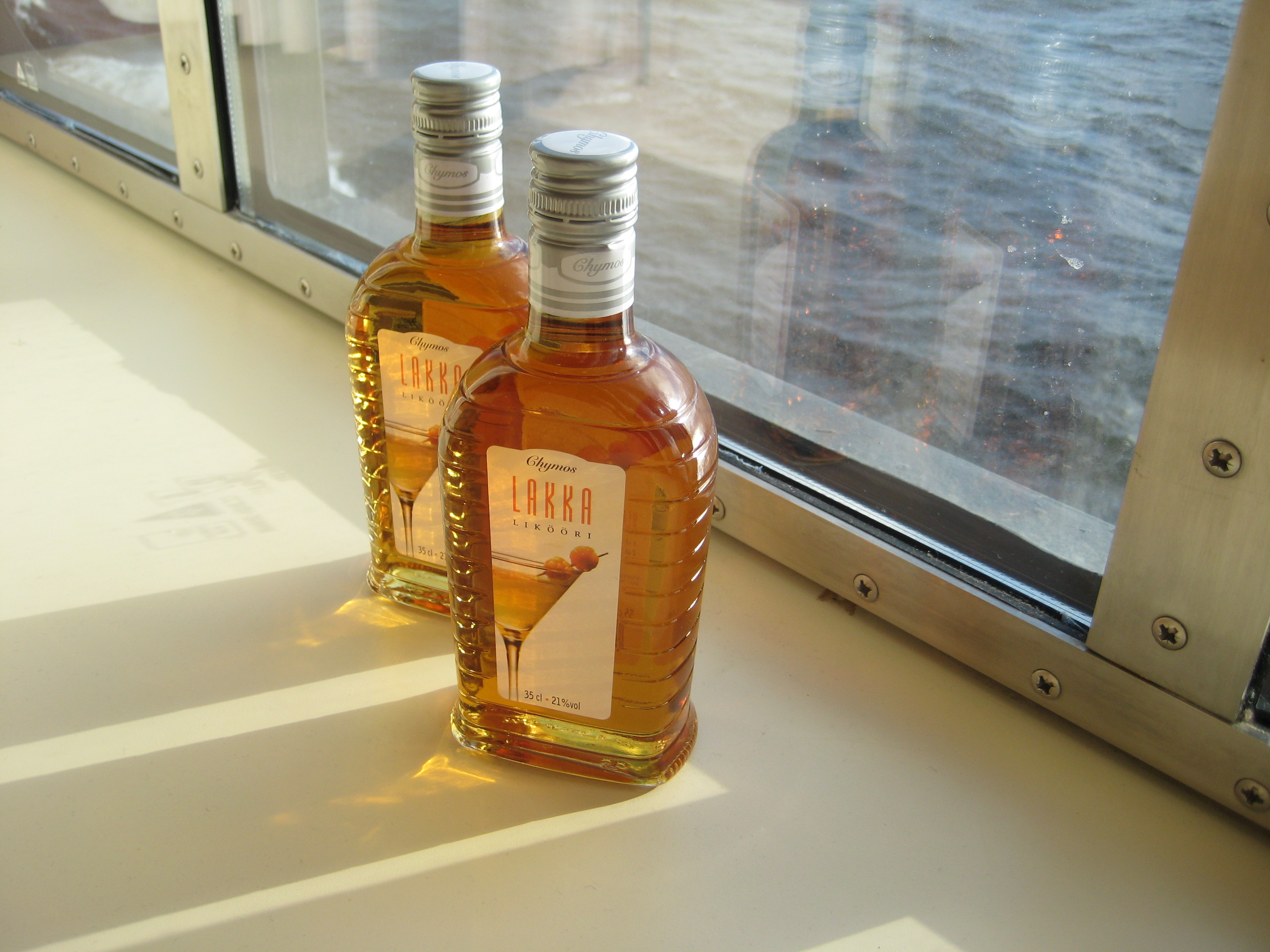
- Type: liqueur
- Distributor: V&S Group
- Alcohol by volume: 21%
- Flavor: cloudberry

Cloudberry liqueur (Finnish: lakkalikööri) or lakka is a liqueur produced in Finland which derives its flavor from the cloudberry fruit. The word lakka means cloudberry in Finnish.

The beverage is produced by soaking the berries in alcohol anywhere between two and six months until sweetened, and is branded by Chymos and Lapponia, both of which are distributed by the Sweden-based V&S Group, best known for its Absolut Vodka product.
