= Coleophora thulea =

Scientific classification
- Kingdom: Animalia
- Phylum: Arthropoda
- Class: Insecta
- Order: Lepidoptera
- Family: Coleophoridae
- Genus: Coleophora
- Species: C. thulea

Binomial name
- Coleophora thulea Johansson, 1967

Species of moth

Coleophora thulea is a moth of the family Coleophoridae. It is found in Fennoscandia and northern Russia.

The wingspan is 11–14 mm. Adults are on wing in June and July.

The larvae feed only on the leaves of Rubus chamaemorus.
