= Bread cheese =

Finnish cheese

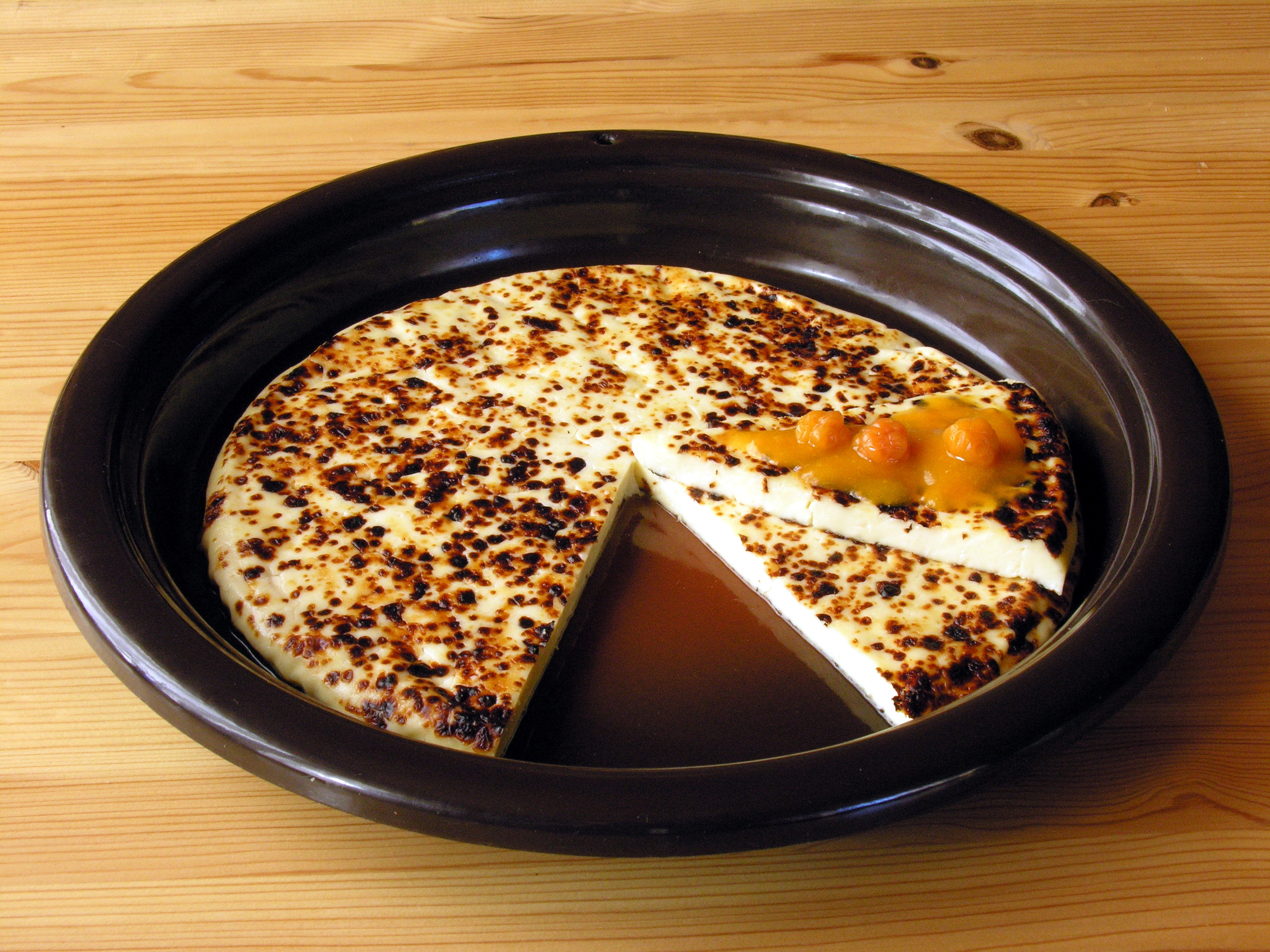
Traditional Finnish leipäjuusto with cloudberry jam

Bread cheese (Finnish: leipäjuusto [ˈlei̯pæˌjuːsto] or juustoleipä [ˈjuːstoˌlei̯pæ]; Meänkieli: kahvijuusto; Swedish: kaffeost or brödost), sometimes known in the United States as Finnish squeaky cheese, is a Finnish fresh cheese traditionally made from cow's colostrum. In the US, cow's milk is generally used but can also be made with goat milk. Commercially available versions are typically made from cow's milk. The cheese originally comes from Southern Ostrobothnia, Northern Finland, and Kainuu.

== Finnish name ==
Traditionally, the cheese has been called leipäjuusto mainly in Ostrobothnia and Lapland, and juustoleipä in Kainuu. Nowadays, the two words are interchangeable, but leipäjuusto is the more common spelling. Other dialects have various names (such as narskujuusto) that refer to the way that fresh leipäjuusto "squeaks" against the teeth when bitten.

== Preparation ==
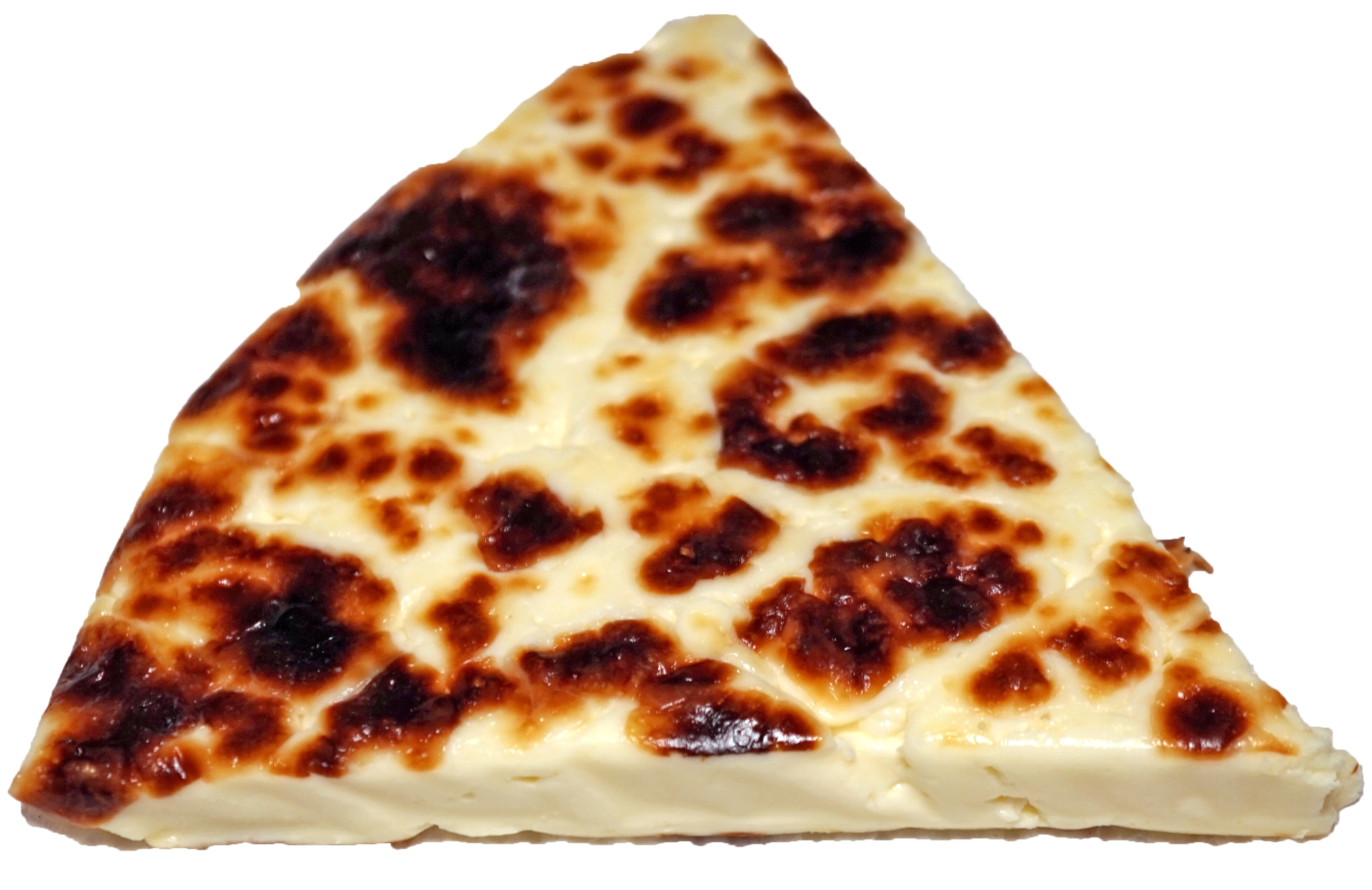
A slice of bread cheese

The milk is curdled and set to form a round disk from two to three centimeters thick. After this, bread cheese is baked, grilled, or flambéed to give it its distinctive brown or charred marks.

Traditionally, bread cheese was dried and could then be stored for up to several years. For eating, the dry, almost rock hard cheese was heated on a fire which softened it and produced an especially appetizing aroma. Even today, the cheese may be dried by keeping it in a well ventilated place for a few days. It has a mild flavour.

== Methods of serving ==
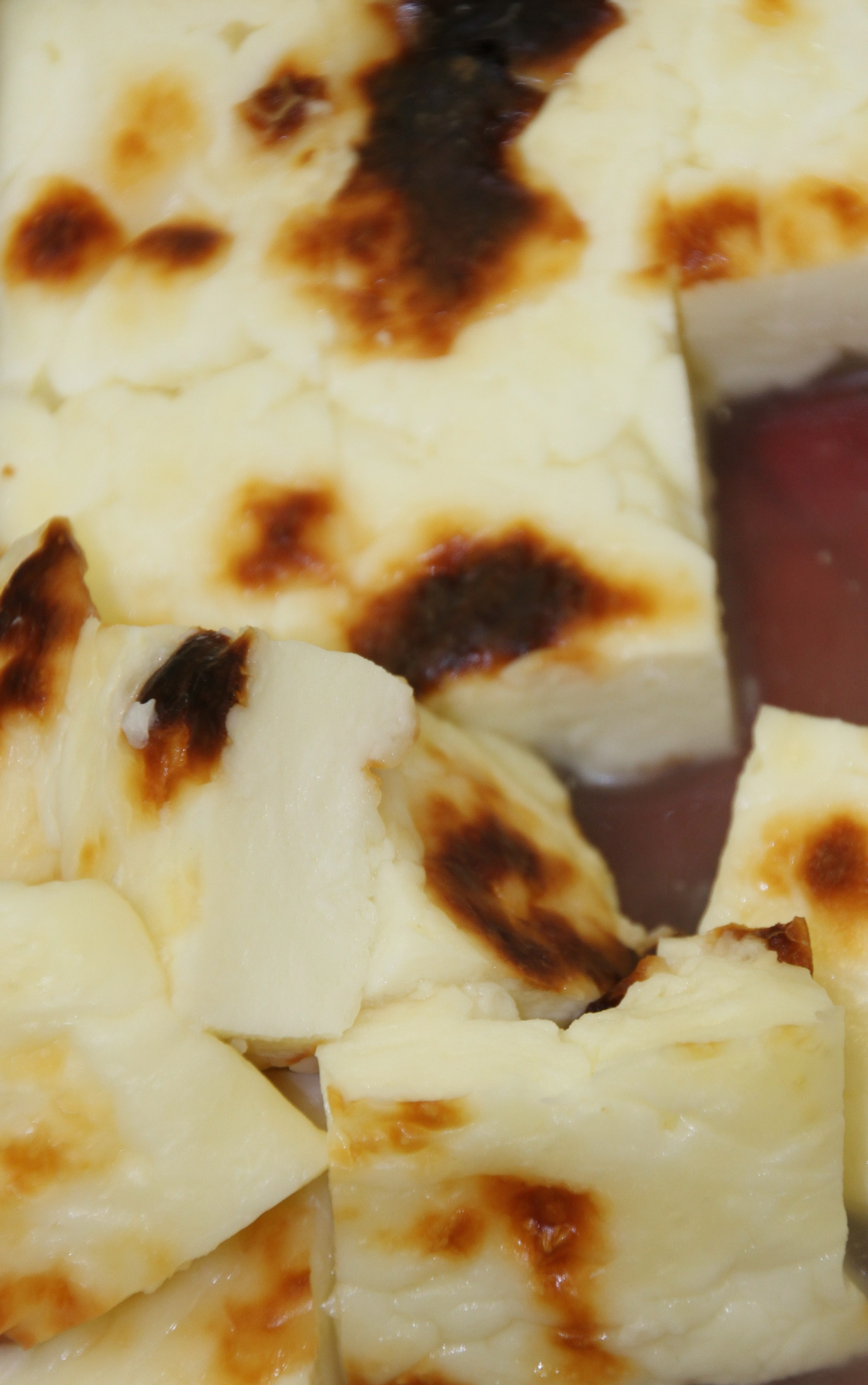
Small pieces of bread cheese for coffee

Bread cheese can be eaten warm or cold, and is served in a number of ways:

- The traditional way is to serve it as slices, as a side dish with coffee.
- A few pieces are placed in a cup, with hot coffee poured on. The Swedish name kaffeost ("coffee cheese") refers to this.
- Served as diamond-shaped pieces, roughly 5 to 7 cm long and a little less wide, with cloudberry jelly or fresh cloudberries.
- Slices of the cheese are cut into a cup or plate, with some cream poured on the pieces so that they soak a little, some cinnamon and sugar sprinkled over it, and grilled in the oven for a moment. Served with cloudberry jelly.
- In modern Finnish cuisine, diced bread cheese is often used as a mild replacement for feta in various salads.
- As a dessert, bread cheese can be served like Camembert, fried on a pan with butter until it softens, and served with jam, traditionally cloudberry.

== See also ==
- Cheese curds (North American squeaky cheese)
- Fried cheese
- Halloumi
- List of cheeses
- Saganaki
