= Omar (candy) =

Caramel candy

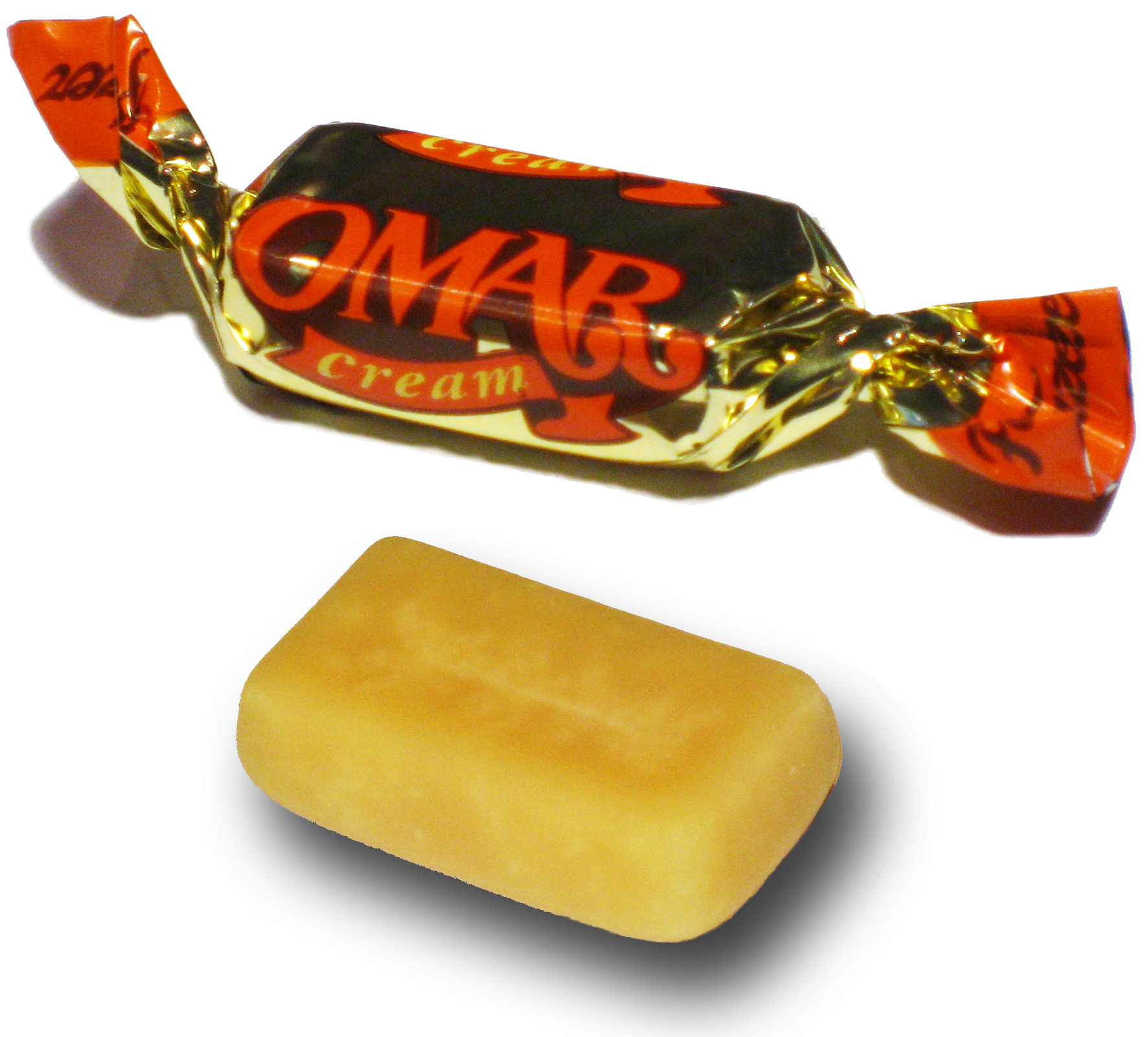
Omar candy

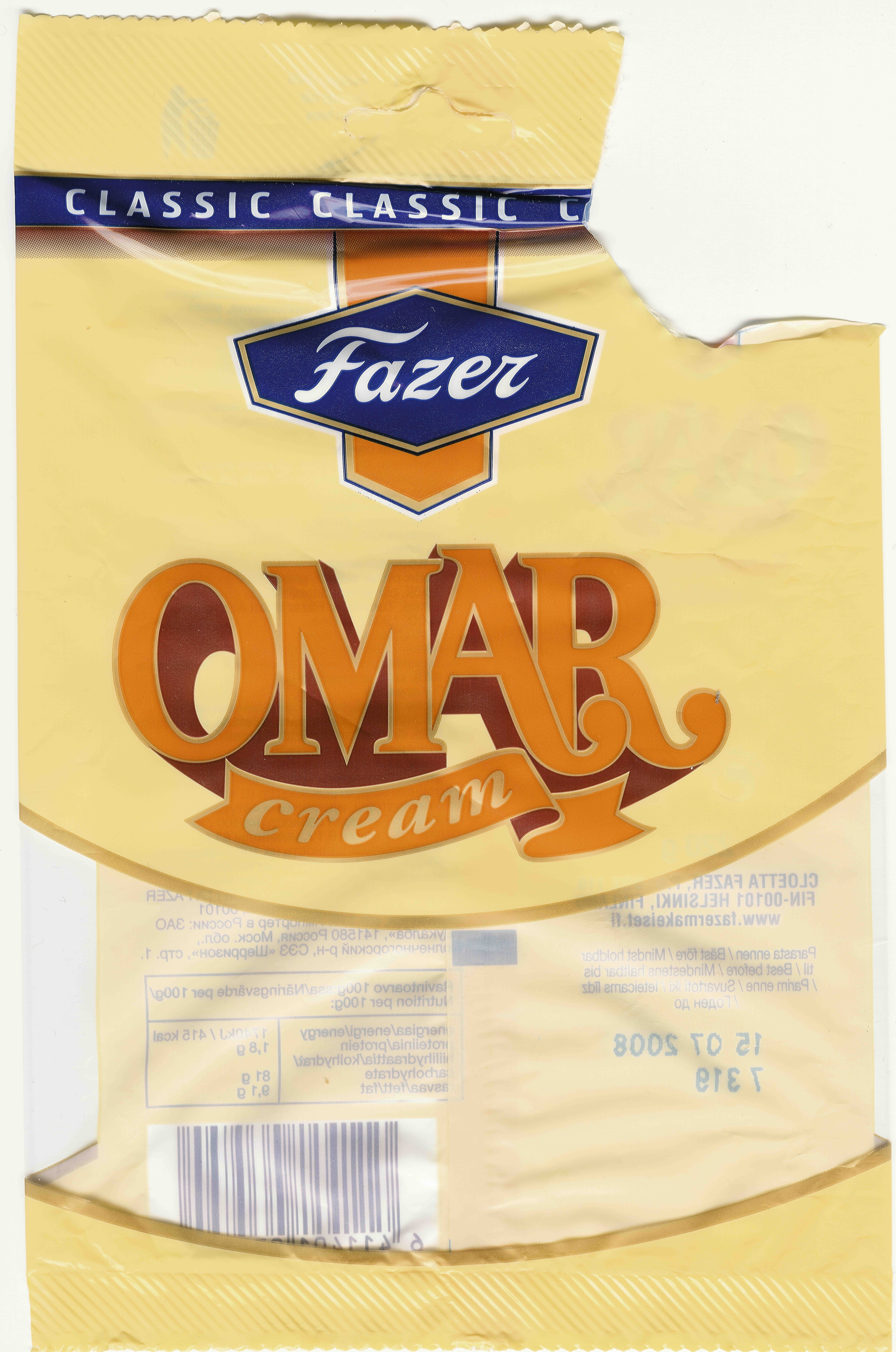
Omar bag

Omar is a caramel candy manufactured by Fazer Confectionery of Finland. Ingredients used in the manufacture of the confectionery are milk, sugar, glucose syrup, hydrogenated vegetable oil, milk fat, stabilizer (E420), salt and vanillin aroma. Omar is sold in 220 gram bags.

Omar was originally made by the Chymos confectionery product company, which started producing the candy in 1966. The name "Omar" was probably chosen by the artist-writer Aimo Vuorinen, who served as Chymos's packaging designer. There have also been Strawberry Omar, Coffee Omar and Omar hard candy versions on the market. Today, there is only a traditional Omar, which is part of Fazer's Classic series. Fazer's products also include Omar-flavoured ice cream and doughnuts.
