= Caramel =

Confectionery product made by heating sugars

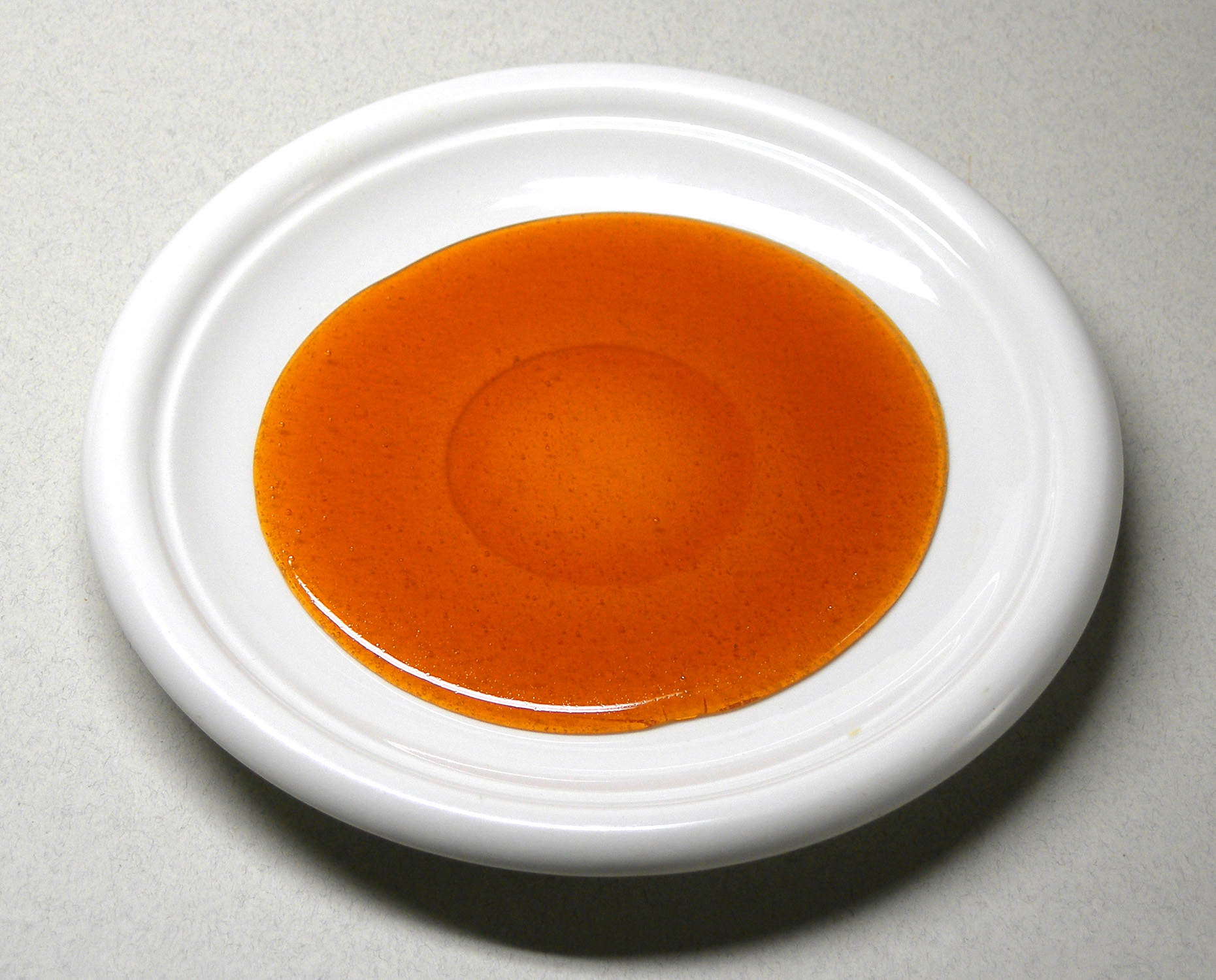
- A saucer of liquid caramel
- Course: Dessert or snack
- Created by: Various
- Main ingredients: Sugar
- Variations: Brittles, pralines, crème brûlée, and crème caramel

Caramel (/ˈkærəˌmɛl/, /ˈkærəməl/ or /ˈkɑːrməl/) is a range of food ingredients made by heating sugars to high temperatures. It is used as a flavoring in puddings and desserts, as a filling in bonbons or candy bars, as a topping for ice cream and custard, as dressing on desserts, and as a colorant commonly used in drinks.

The process of caramelization primarily consists of heating sugars slowly to around 170 °C (340 °F). As the sugar heats, the molecules break down and form compounds with a characteristic color and flavor.

A variety of sweets, desserts, toppings, and confections are made with caramel, including tres leches cake, brittles, nougats, pralines, flan, crème brûlée, crème caramel, and caramel apples.

== Etymology ==
The English word comes from French caramel, borrowed from Spanish caramelo (18th century), itself possibly from Portuguese caramelo. Most likely that comes from Late Latin calamellus 'sugar cane', a diminutive of calamus 'reed, cane', itself from Greek κάλαμος. Less likely, it comes from Medieval Latin cannamella, from canna 'cane' + mella 'honey'. Finally, some dictionaries connect it to Arabic kora-moħalláh 'ball of sweet'.

== Sauce ==
Caramel sauce is made by mixing caramelized sugar with cream. Depending on the intended application, additional ingredients such as butter, fruit purees, liquors, or vanilla can be used. Caramel sauce is used in a range of desserts, especially as a topping for ice cream. When it is used for crème caramel or flan, it is known as clear caramel and only contains caramelized sugar and water.

== Candy ==
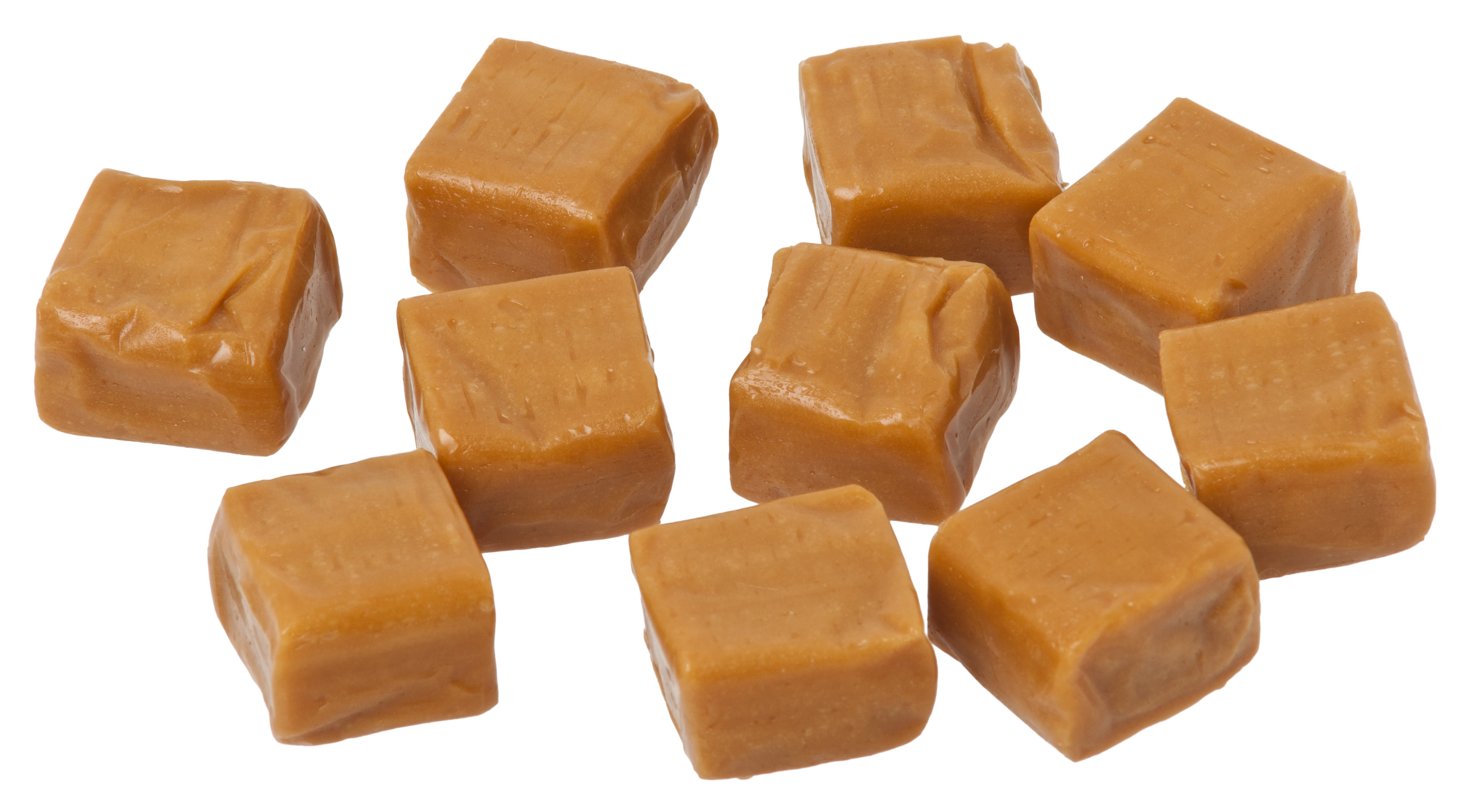
Milk caramel manufactured as square candies, either for eating or for melting down

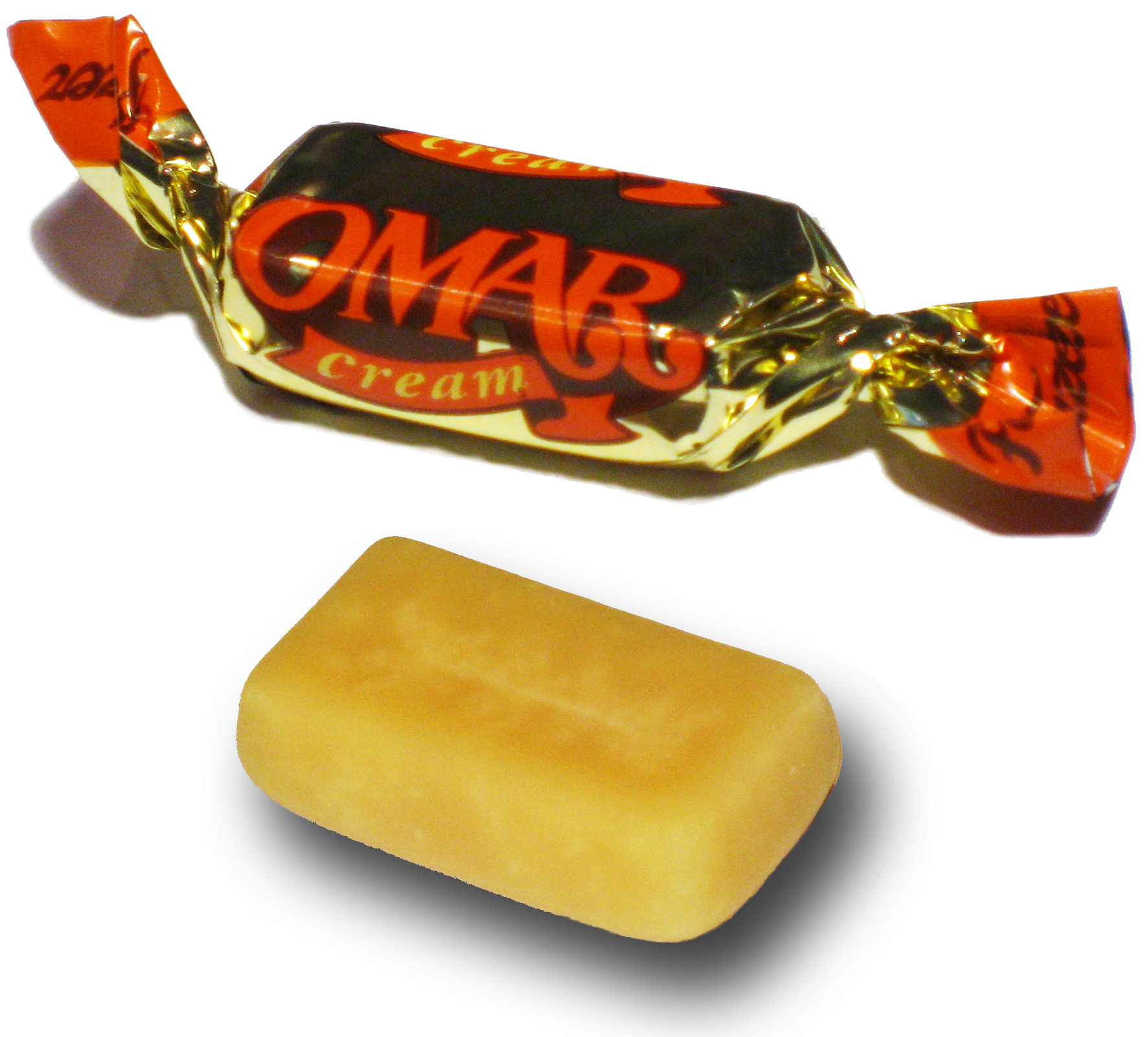
Omar caramel candies

Caramel candy, or "caramels", and sometimes called "toffee" (though this also refers to other types of candy), is a soft, dense, chewy candy made by boiling a mixture of milk or cream, sugar(s), glucose, butter, and vanilla (or vanilla flavoring). The sugar and glucose are combined and heated to reach 130 °C (270 °F); the cream and butter are then added which cools the mixture. The mixture is then stirred and reheated until it reaches 120 °C (250 °F). Upon completion of cooking, vanilla or any additional flavorings and salt are added. Adding the vanilla or flavorings earlier would result in them burning off at the high temperatures. Adding salt earlier in the process would result in inverting the sugars as they cooked.

Alternatively, all ingredients may be cooked together. In this procedure, the mixture is not heated above the firm ball stage (120 °C [250 °F]), so that caramelization of the milk occurs. This temperature is not high enough to caramelize sugar and this type of candy is often called milk caramel or cream caramel. Even though caramel candy is sometimes called "toffee" and is also compared with butterscotch, there is a difference. While toffee and butterscotch are more closely related than caramel, they do have most of the same ingredients. However, toffee and butterscotch use molasses or brown sugar while caramel uses white sugar. They are also cooked at different temperatures and they each have their own cooking techniques that make them unique in taste and shape.

== Salting ==
As early as the 19th century, baked products with caramelized sugar and salted dough appeared in certain regional cuisines, notably the kouign-amann in the Brittany region of France where this pairing is strongly apparent. During the early 20th century and following World War II, this pairing was expanded into other types of pastries and cakes.

Salted caramel sweets with milk or butter were sold in Brittany as early as 1946, reviving recipes already used before World War II. The Quiberon niniche and Salidou spread are examples of such products which gained popularity in the late 1940s and 1950s in Brittany. Recipes almost always contained milk or butter which made these products perishable and limited their commercialization.

In 1977, French pastry chef Henri Le Roux developed a significantly more stable salted caramel sweet in Quiberon, Brittany, in the form of a salted butter caramel with crushed nuts (caramel au beurre salé), using Breton demi-sel butter. It was named the "Best confectionery in France" (Meilleur Bonbon de France) at the Paris Salon International de la Confiserie in 1980. Le Roux registered the trademark "CBS" (caramel au beurre salé) the year after.

Salted caramel sweets became widely popular throughout France and other French-speaking European countries (notably Belgium and Switzerland, which already had a tradition for fine chocolate and confectionery), and for years French, Belgian and Swiss children added it to their goûter, a meal eaten around 4 pm to restore their energy after school. Goûter usually consists of bread with jam or caramel spread, croissants or pain au chocolat, fruit and hot chocolate.

In the late 1990s, Parisian pastry chef Pierre Hermé introduced his salted butter and caramel macarons, and by 2000, high-end chefs started adding a bit of salt to caramel and chocolate dishes. In 2008 it entered the mass market, when Häagen-Dazs and Starbucks started selling it.

Originally used in desserts, the confection has seen wide use elsewhere, including in hot chocolate and spirits such as vodka. A 2017 study conducted by the University of Florida found that salted caramel's popularity may partly be the result of its effects on the reward systems of the human brain, resulting in a phenomenon named "hedonic escalation", as the complex flavour profile of the caramel causes the brain to produce more endogenous opioids than with other foods, encouraging further consumption.

== Colouring ==
Caramel colouring, a dark, bitter liquid, is the highly concentrated product of near total caramelization, used commercially as food and beverage colouring, e.g., in cola.

== Chemistry ==
Caramelization is the removal of water from a sugar, proceeding to isomerization and polymerization of the sugars into various high-molecular-weight compounds. Compounds such as difructose anhydride may be created from the monosaccharides after water loss. Fragmentation reactions result in low-molecular-weight compounds that may be volatile and may contribute to flavor. Polymerization reactions lead to larger-molecular-weight compounds that contribute to the dark-brown color. Caramel can be produced in many forms such as sauce, chewy candy, or hard candy depending on how much of an ingredient is added and the temperature it is being prepared at. In modern recipes and in commercial production, glucose (from corn syrup or wheat) or invert sugar is added to prevent crystallization, making up 10–50% of the sugars by mass. "Wet caramels" made by heating sucrose and water instead of sucrose alone produce their own invert sugar due to thermal reaction, but not necessarily enough to prevent crystallization in traditional recipes.

== See also ==
- Caramel apple, a whole apple covered in a layer of caramel or chocolate
- Caramel corn, popcorn coated in caramel
- Dodol, a caramelized confection made with coconut milk
- Dulce de leche, caramelized sweetened milk
- Fudge
- Maillard reaction
- Nougat, using egg white rather than milk products
- Tablet, Scottish candy made with condensed milk
- Toffee, a type of confection
