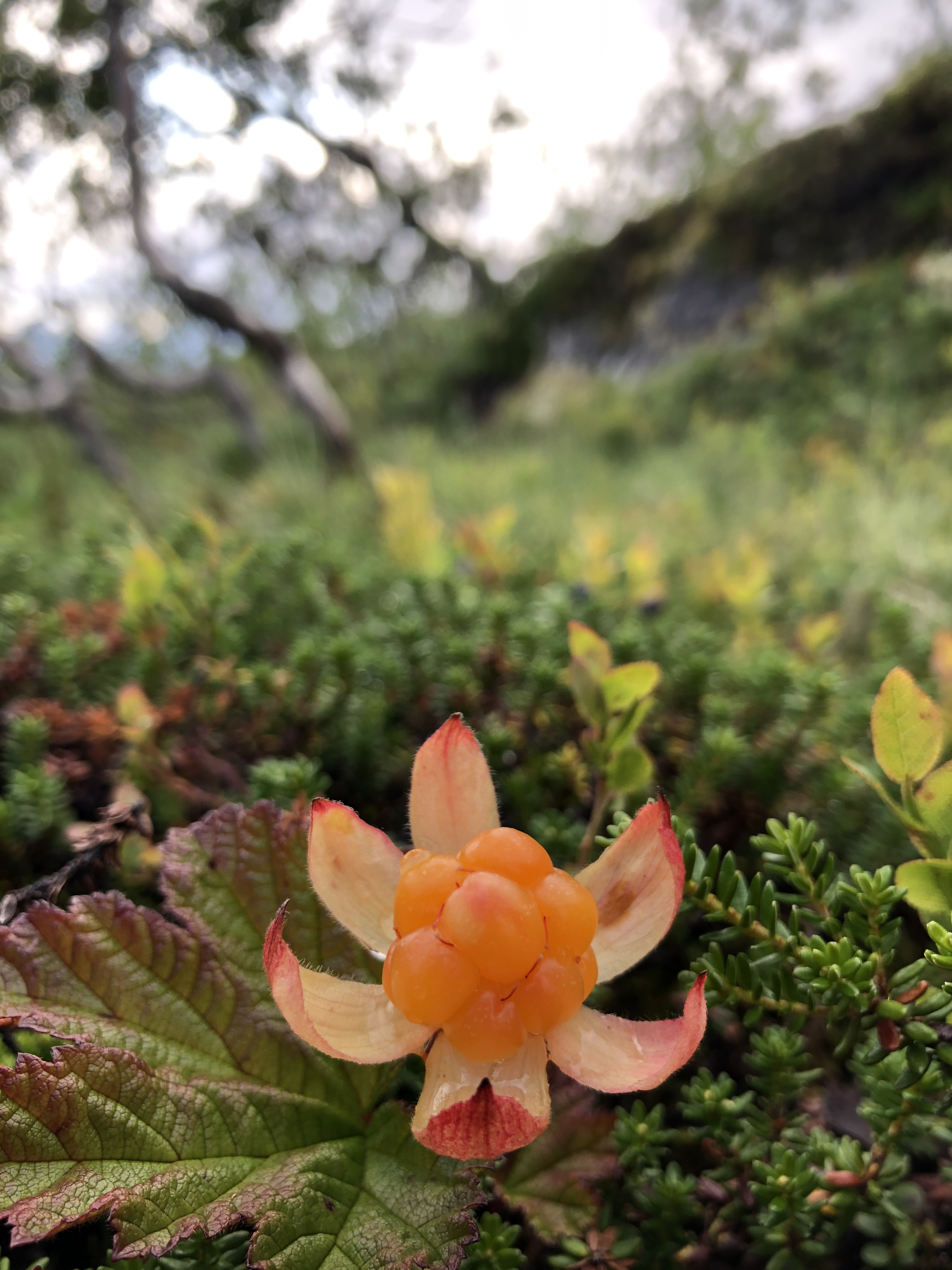
- Ripe cloudberry

Conservation status
- Least Concern (IUCN 3.1)

Scientific classification
- Kingdom: Plantae
- Clade: Tracheophytes
- Clade: Angiosperms
- Clade: Eudicots
- Clade: Rosids
- Order: Rosales
- Family: Rosaceae
- Genus: Rubus
- Subgenus: Rubus subg. Chamaemorus
- Species: R. chamaemorus

Binomial name
- Rubus chamaemorus L. 1753 not Fisch. ex Ser. 1825
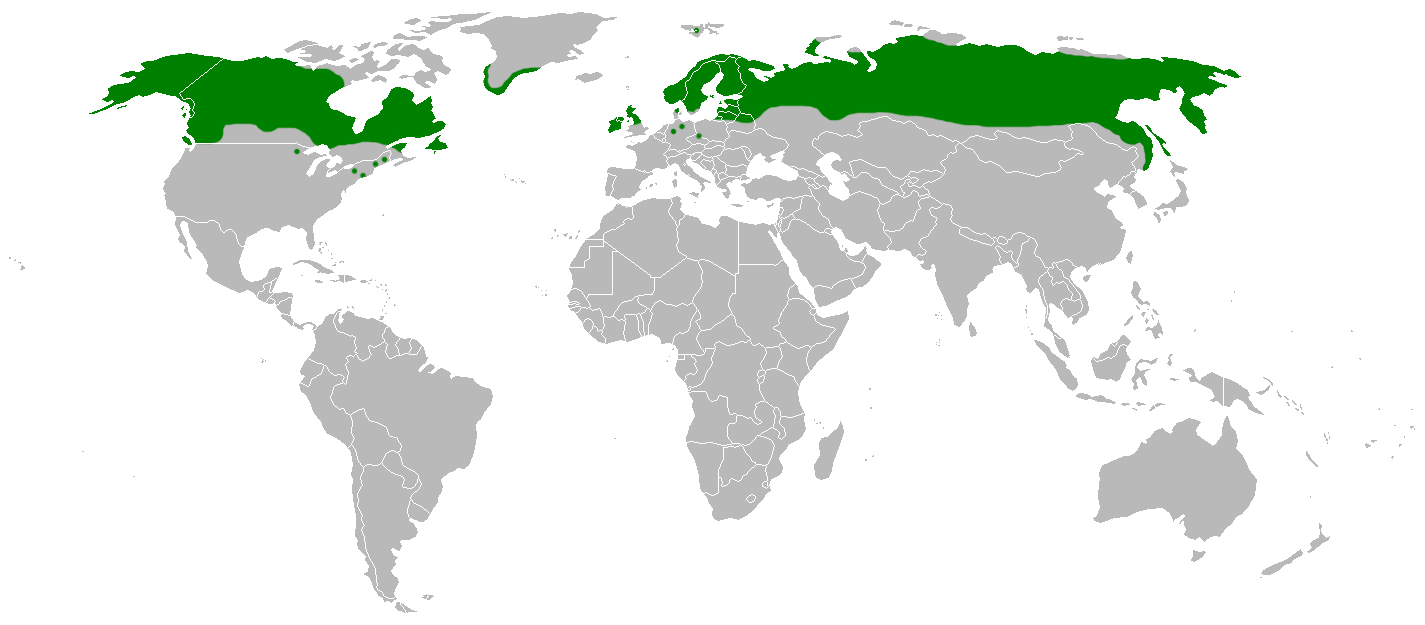
- Distribution of Rubus chamaemorus

Synonyms
- Synonymy: Chamaemorus anglica Clus. ex Greene; Chamaemorus anglicus Greene; Chamaemorus chamaemorus (L.) House; Chamaemorus norvegicus Greene; Chamaemorus norwegica Clus. ex Greene; Rubus chamaemorus var. pseudochamaemorus (Tolm.) Hulten; Rubus nubis Gray; Rubus pseudochamaemorus Tolm.; Rubus yessoicus Kuntze

= Rubus chamaemorus =

Species of flowering plant in the rose family

Rubus chamaemorus is a species of flowering plant in the genus Rubus (which also includes blackberries and raspberries, among others). It has numerous common names varying by region, such as cloudberry, Nordic berry, Arctic berry, bakeapple, knotberry, aqpik, and lowbush salmonberry.

A herbaceous perennial, it produces amber-colored fruit similar in structure to the blackberry. It is native to cool temperate regions, alpine and Arctic tundra, and boreal forest. Although not cultivated commercially, the fruit is picked in the wild, and is versatile for use in various confectionery dishes, desserts, and beverages.

== Description ==
Unlike most Rubus species, the cloudberry is dioecious, and fruit production by a female plant requires pollination from a male plant. The plant germinates from seeds spread by animals that consumed the fruit, then reproduces locally by rhizomes. Vegetative growth can be extensive, with rhizomes growing 10 meters (33 feet) or longer.

The cloudberry grows 10–25 centimetres (4–10 in) high. The short stems are unbranched and have 1-3 leaves. The leaves have five to seven handlike (palmate) lobes. After pollination, the white (sometimes reddish-tipped) flowers form raspberry-sized aggregate fruits, which are more plentiful in wooded rather than sun-exposed habitats. Consisting of between five and 25 drupelets, each fruit is initially pale red, ripening into an amber color in early autumn. After pollination the sepals close around the developing fruit, opening again when the fruit is ripe.

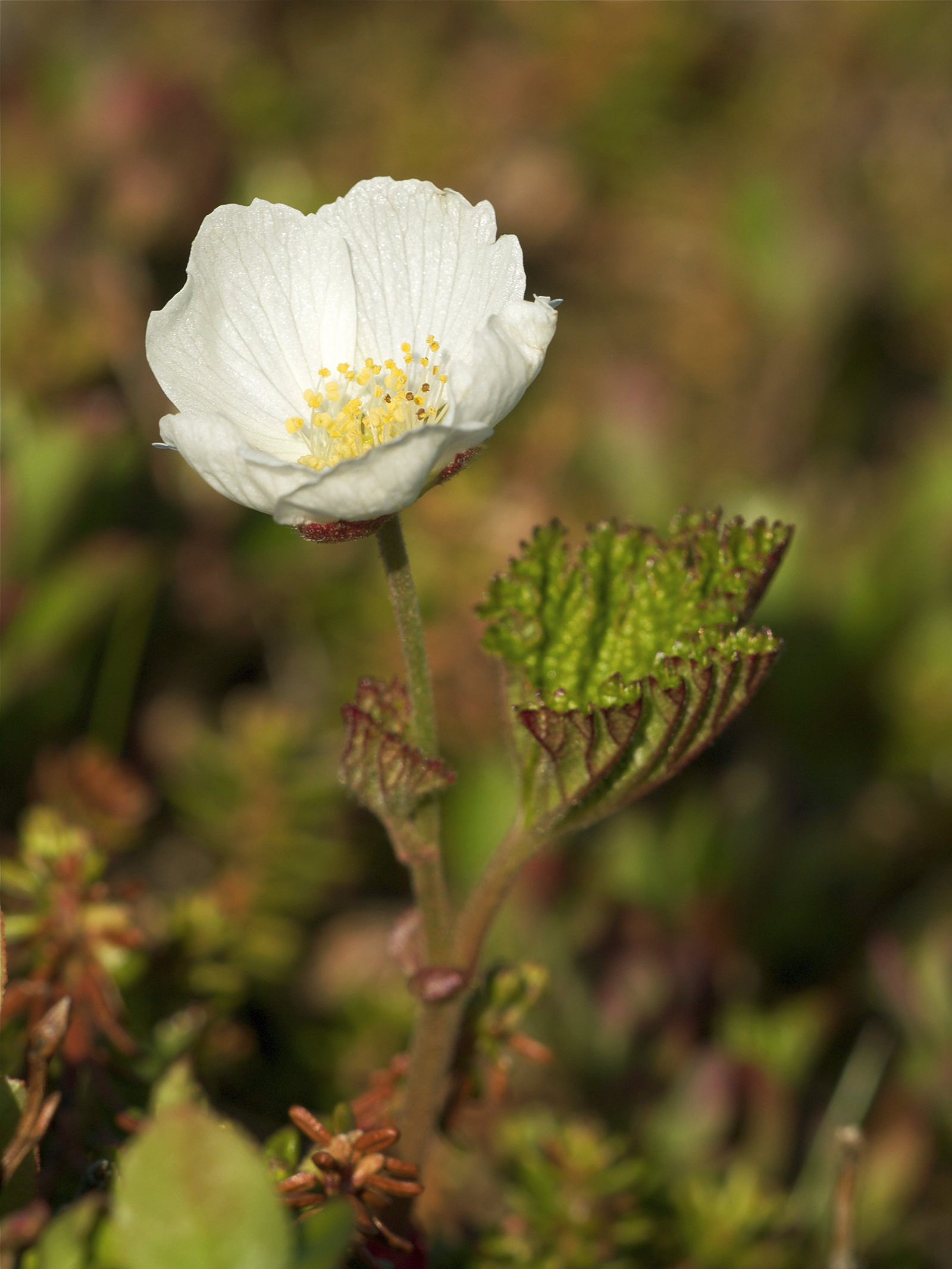
Male flower

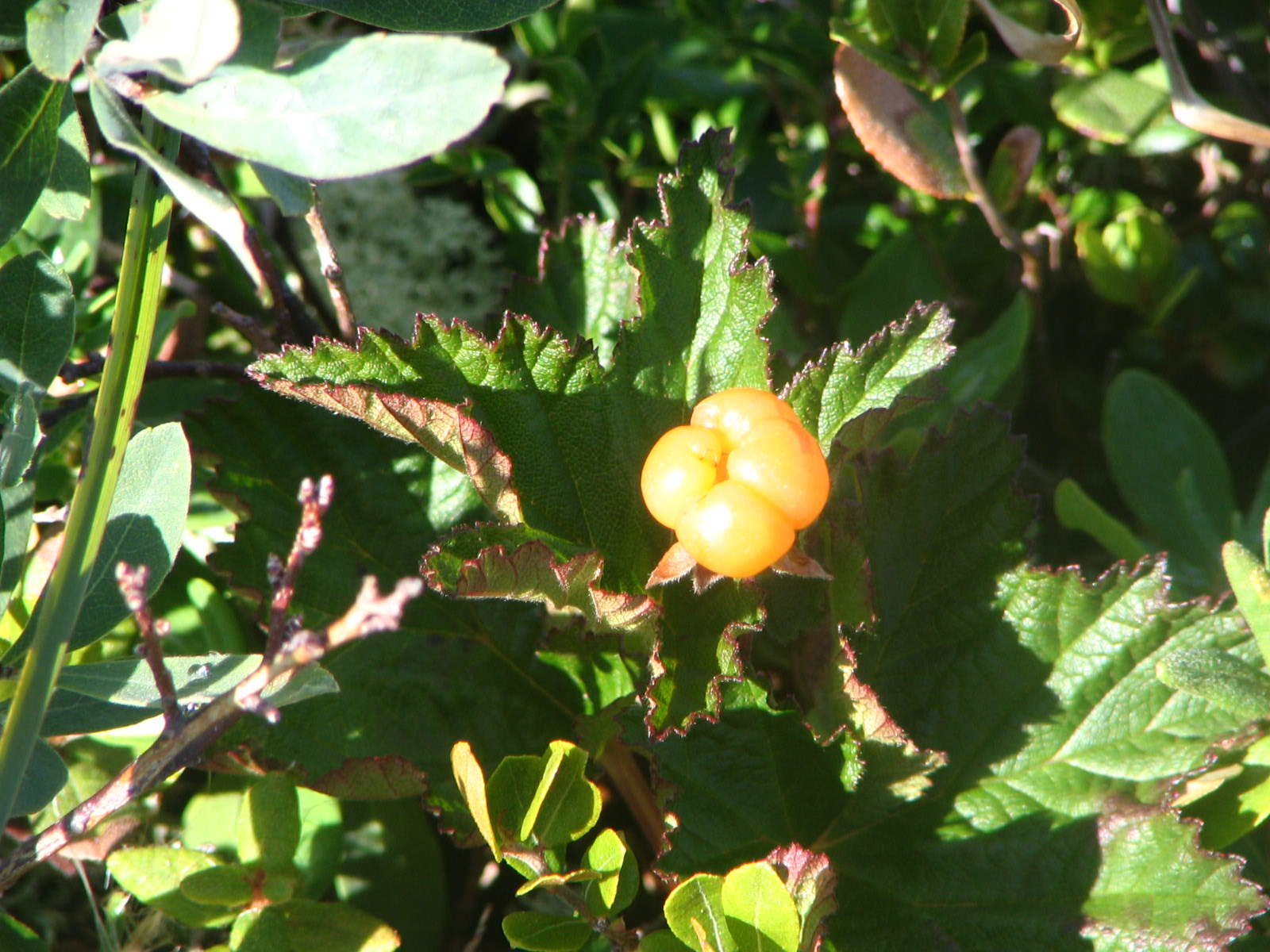
Foliage and fruit in Côte-Nord, Quebec

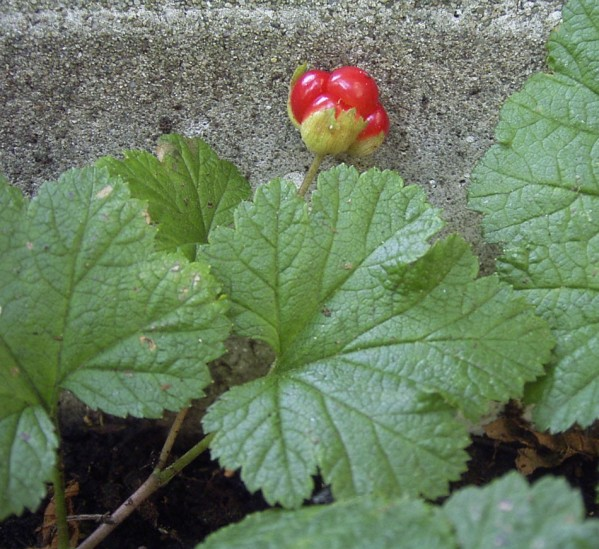
Unripe cloudberry

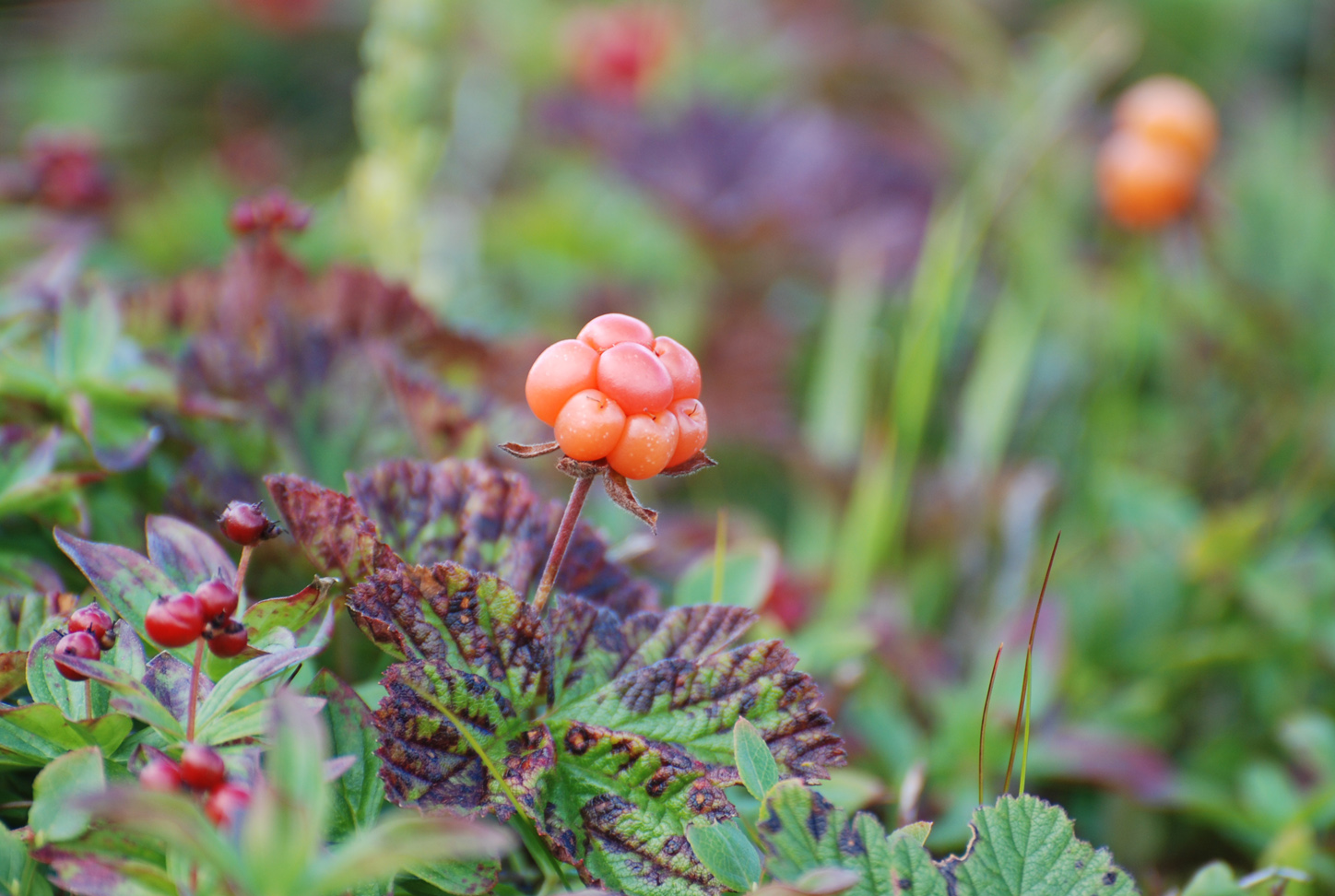
Ripe cloudberries

=== Chemistry ===
Cloudberries are rich in vitamin C, citric acid, malic acid, α-tocopherol, anthocyanins, and the provitamin A carotenoid, β-carotene in contents that differ across regions of Finland due to sunlight exposure, rainfall, and temperature. The ellagitannins lambertianin C and sanguiin H-6 are also present. Genotype of cloudberry variants may also affect polyphenol composition, particularly for ellagitannins, sanguiin H-6, anthocyanins and quercetin.

== Distribution and habitat ==
Cloudberries are a circumpolar boreal plant, occurring naturally throughout the Northern Hemisphere from 78°N, south to about 55°N, and are scattered south to 44°N mainly in mountainous areas and moorlands. In Europe, they grow in the Nordic countries, but are rare in the Baltic states (Estonia, Latvia, and Lithuania) and Poland. They are present in the English Pennines and the Scottish Highlands, while a single, fragile site exists in the Sperrin Mountains of Northern Ireland. They occur across northern Russia east towards the Pacific Ocean as far south as Japan in the island of Hokkaido. Svalbard was historically too cold for cloudberries but since 2023, warming has resulted in the establishment and survival of cloudberry plants on the islands.

In North America, cloudberries grow wild across Greenland, most of northern Canada, Alaska, northern Minnesota, New Hampshire, Maine, and New York.

Wide distribution occurs due to the excretion of the indigestible seeds by birds and mammals. Further distribution arises through its rhizomes, which are up to 10 m (33 ft) long and grow about 10–15 cm (4–6 in) below the soil surface, developing extensive and dense berry patches. Cuttings of these taken in May or August are successful in producing a genetic clone of the parent plant. The cloudberry grows in bogs, marshes, wet meadows, and tundra, and at elevations of 1,743 m (5,719 ft) above sea level in Norway, requiring acidic ground (between 3.5 and 5.0 pH).

== Ecology ==
Cloudberry leaves are food for caterpillars of several Lepidoptera species. The larvae of the moth Coleophora thulea has no other known food plants.

== Conservation ==
The plant occurs in the wild across several geographic zones, and is not considered "vulnerable", but rather is listed as having "least concern" by the International Union for Conservation of Nature. Cloudberry grows profusely in sphagnum moss and on soils with high moisture content, both in open areas and under tree canopies, particularly those of the black spruce.

== Cultivation ==
As mainly a tundra species, cloudberries grow in the wild, and are not cultivated on a commercial scale. In northern Alberta, agriculture, energy and industrial footprints reduce habitat suitability.

== Uses ==
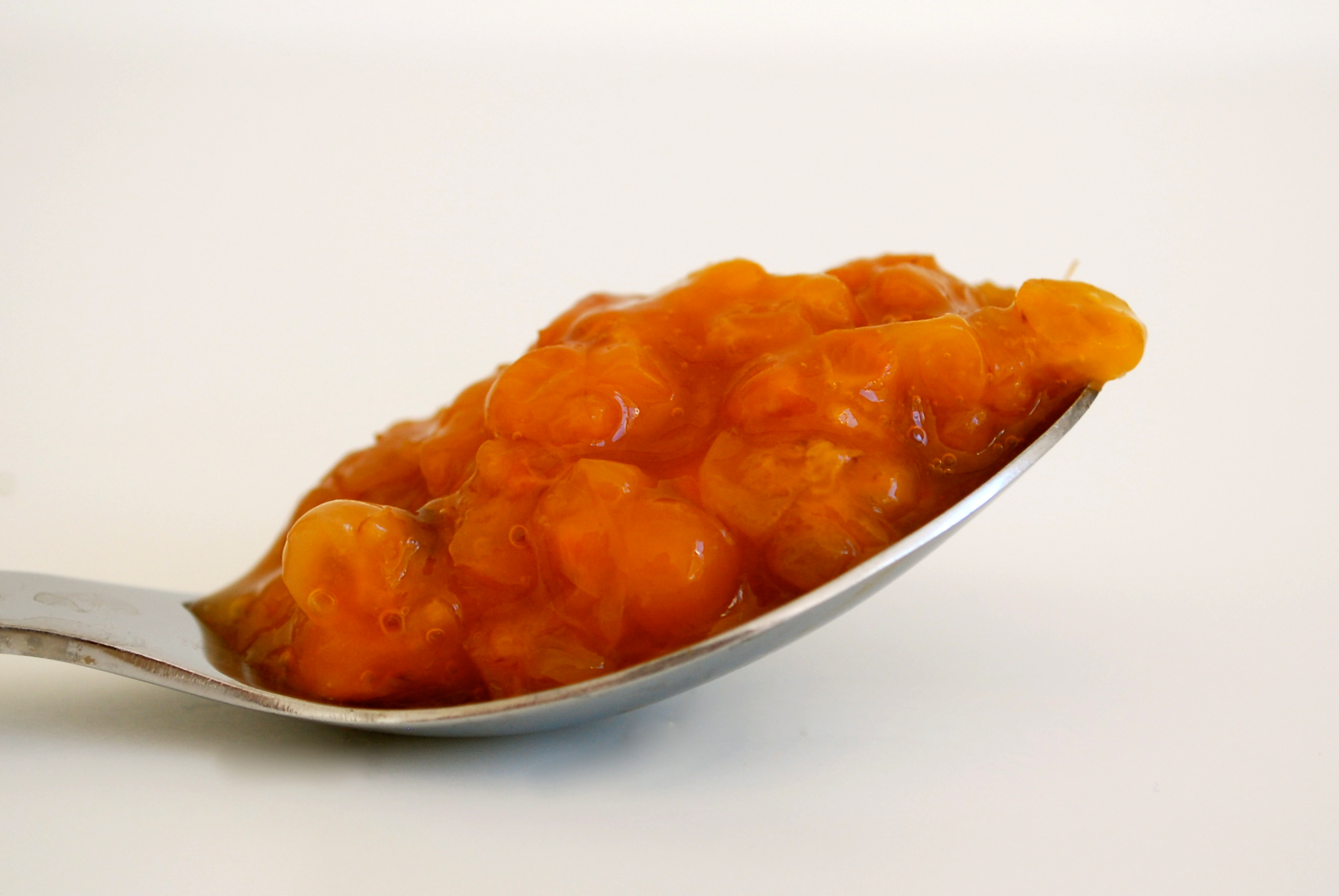
Cloudberry jam

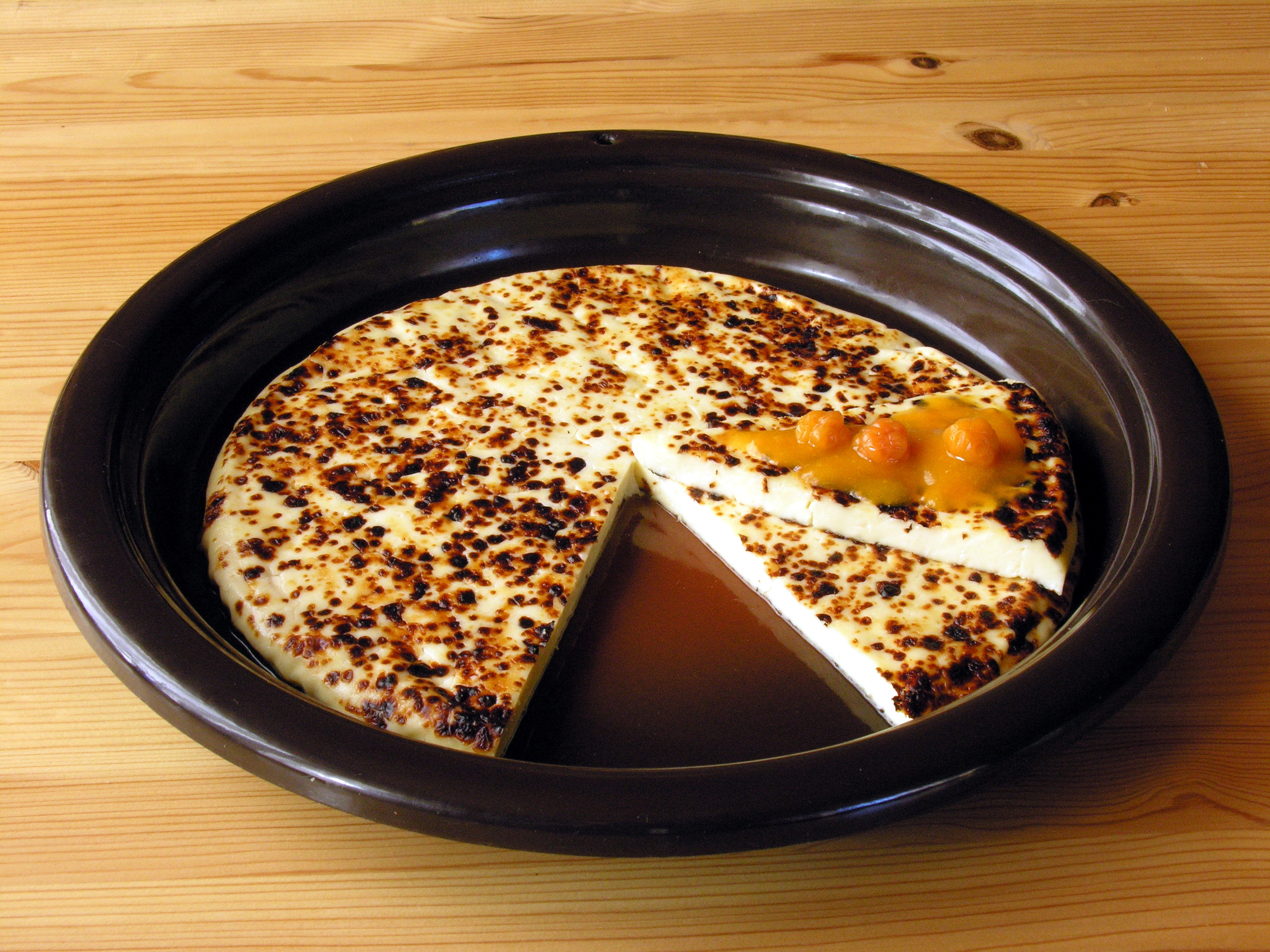
Bread cheese with cloudberry jam

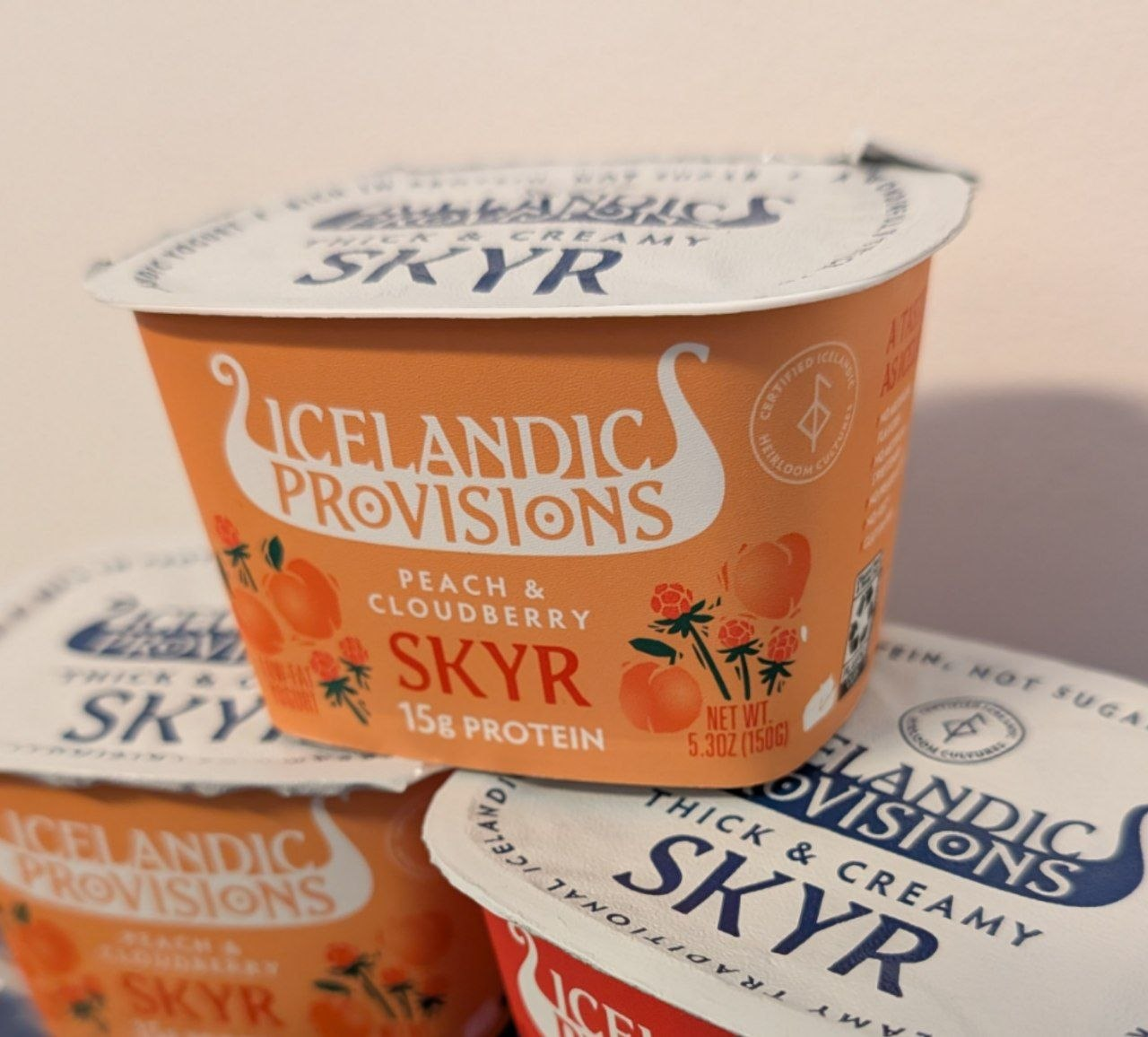
Skyr flavored with peaches and cloudberries, available at a US grocery store

When ripe, cloudberry fruits are golden-yellow, soft, and juicy, and are rich in vitamin C. When eaten fresh, cloudberries have a distinctive tart taste. They are often made into jams, juices, tarts, and liqueurs. In Finland, the berries are eaten with heated leipäjuusto (a local cheese; the name translates to "bread-cheese"), as well as cream and sugar. In Sweden, cloudberries (hjortron, also known in northern Sweden as snattren) and cloudberry jam are used as a topping for ice cream, pancakes, and waffles.

In Norway, they are often mixed with whipped cream and sugar to be served as a dessert called moltekrem (cloudberry cream), as a jam or as an ingredient in homemade ice cream. Cloudberry yoghurt—molte- or multeyoughurt—is a supermarket item in Norway.

In Newfoundland and Labrador, Canada, cloudberries are used to make bakeapple pie, jams, jellies, fruit wines, and toppings for cheesecakes and ice cream.

Arctic Yup'ik and Inupiat mix the berries with seal oil, reindeer or caribou fat (which is diced and made fluffy with seal oil) and sugar to make "Eskimo ice cream" or akutaq. The recipes vary by region. Along the Yukon and Kuskokwim River areas, white fish (pike) along with shortening and sugar are used. The berries are an important traditional food resource for Indigenous people in the Arctic, including the Yup'ik, Inuit and Sami.

The berries have high content of vitamin C, vitamin E, and dietary fiber. Cloudberries can be preserved in their own juice without added sugar, if stored cool.

=== Alcoholic drinks ===
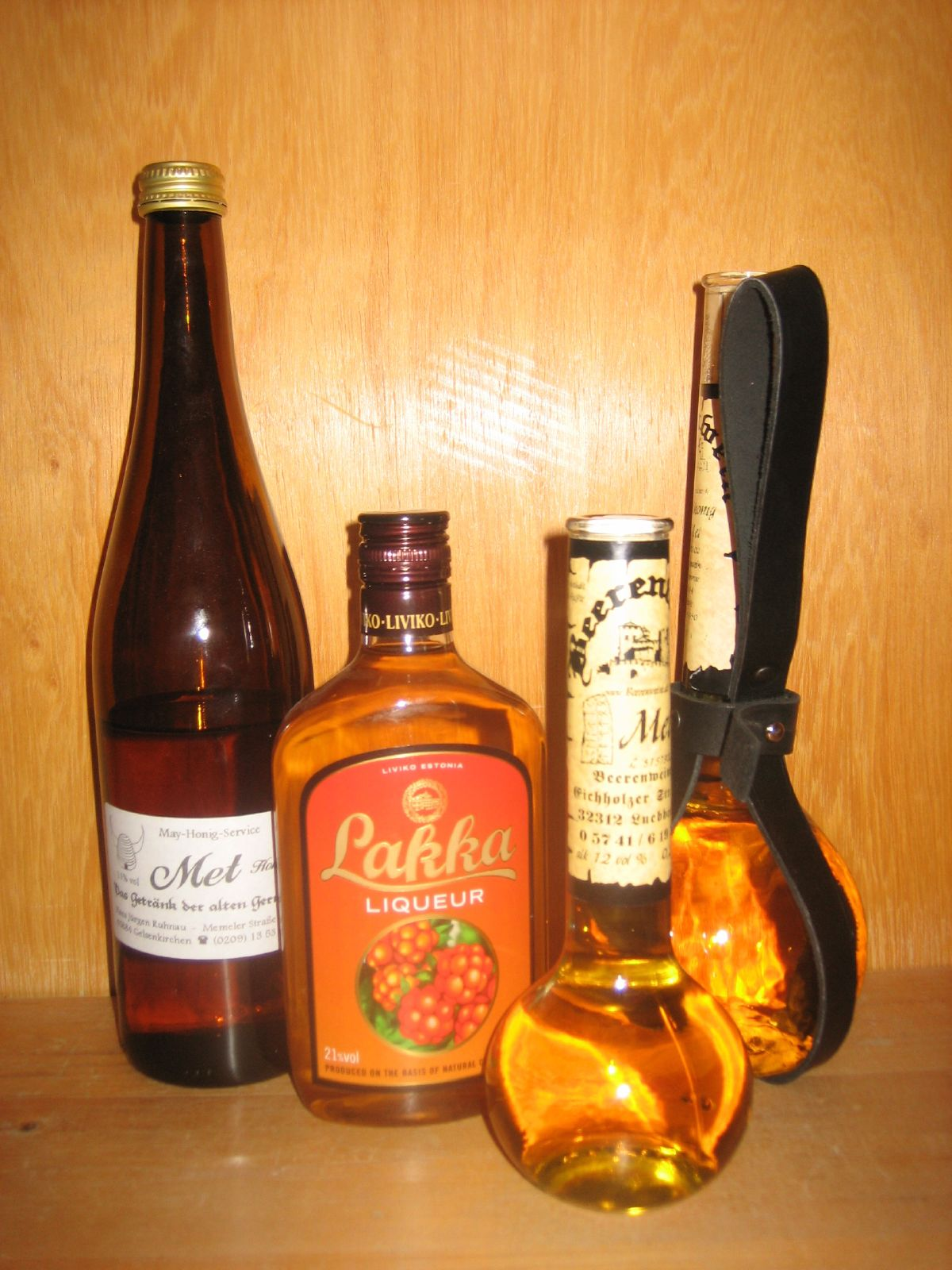
Bottle of Lakka (Cloudberry) liqueur

In Nordic countries, traditional liqueurs such as lakkalikööri (Finland) are made of cloudberry, having a strong taste and high sugar content. In Sweden, cloudberry flavoured gin is produced in limited quantities. Cloudberry is used as a flavouring for making akvavit. In northeastern Quebec, a cloudberry liqueur known as chicoutai (Innu-aimun name) is made. In Newfoundland and Labrador, cloudberries (called "bakeapples") have been used to make fruit wine, bitters, and beer.

Polyphenol extracts from cloudberries have improved storage properties when microencapsulated using maltodextrin DE5-8. At least 14 volatile compounds, including vanillin, account for the aroma of cloudberries.

=== Harvesting on public property ===
In some northern European countries, such as in Norway's counties of Nordland, Troms and Finnmark, a common-use policy on non-wood forest products allows anyone to pick cloudberries on public property and eat them on location, but only local residents may transport them from that location. Transporting ripe cloudberries from the harvest location is permitted in many countries.

Harvesting unripe cloudberries in Norway was illegal between 1970 and 2004. Many people believe that it is still illegal to harvest unripe cloudberries in Norway, but that law is no longer in effect.

== In culture ==
Coat of arms of Muurame

The cloudberry appears on the Finnish version of the 2 euro coin. The name of the hill Beinn nan Oighreag in Breadalbane in the Scottish Highlands means "Hill of the Cloudberries" in Scottish Gaelic. Transactions of Camden's Britain (1637 edition) indicate the etymological origins of 'cloud-berry', the plant's name in old Lancashire dialect: 'Pendelhill [in Lancashire] advenceth itselfe up the skie ... and in the very top thereof bringeth forth a peculiar plant which, as though it came out of the clowdes, they tearme clowdes-berry'. In Norrland cloudberries are known as Norrland's gold.

In Newfoundland and Labrador, several communities, including Garnish and Forteau, host festivals celebrating the harvest of cloudberries.
